= King of the gods =

Leading or primary god of a polytheistic pantheon

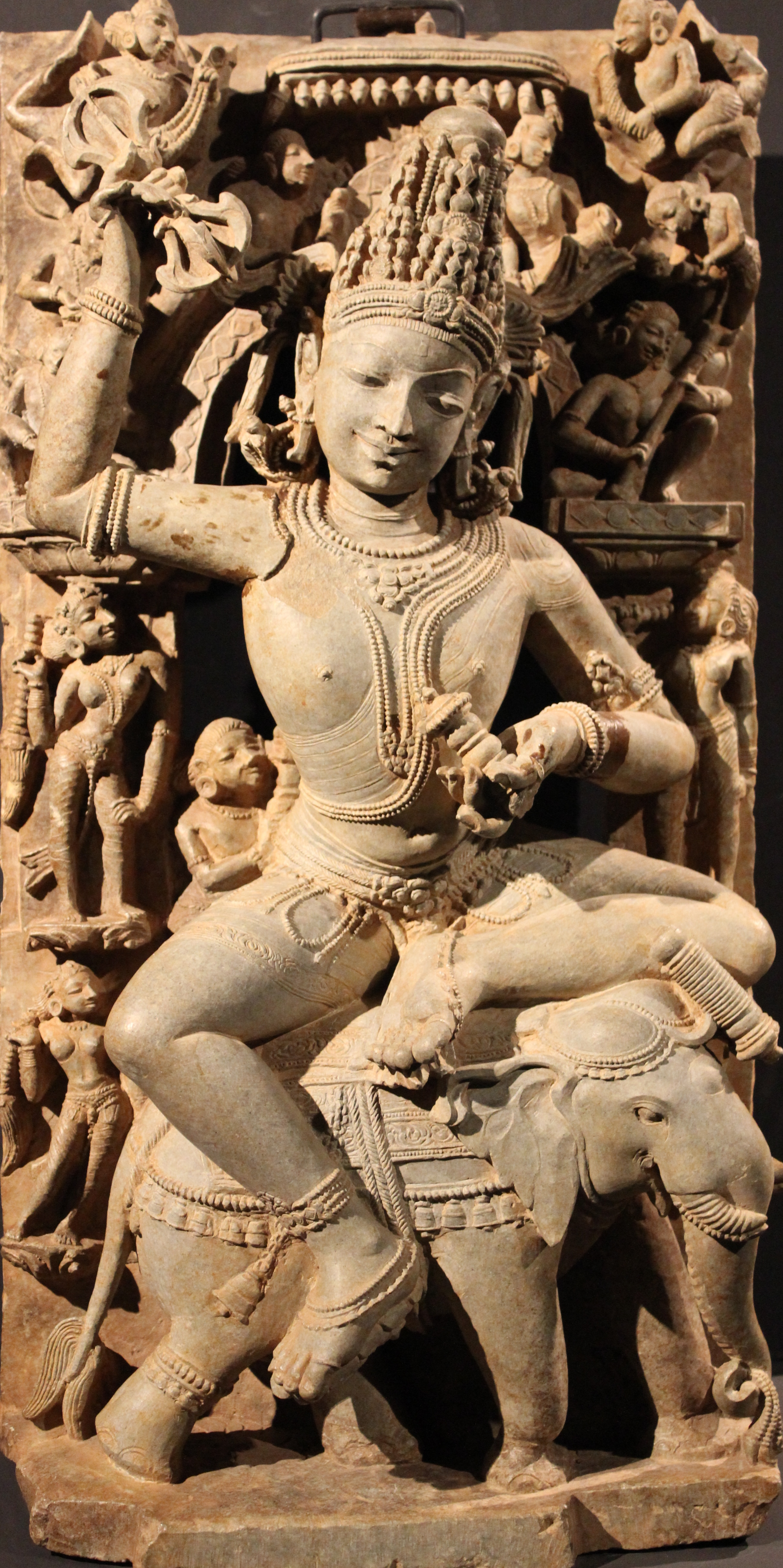
Indra, the Hindu king of the Devas and Devis

In polytheistic religions, there is sometimes a deity who is considered king of the gods, for example by being their sky father. This tendency can parallel the growth of hierarchical systems of political power in which a monarch eventually comes to assume ultimate authority for human affairs. Other gods come to serve in a Divine Council or pantheon; such subsidiary courtier-deities are usually linked by family ties from the union of a single husband or wife, or else from an androgynous divinity who is responsible for the creation.

Historically, subsequent social events, such as invasions or shifts in power structures, can cause the previous king of the gods to be displaced by a new divinity, who assumes the displaced god's attributes and functions. Frequently the king of the gods has at least one wife who is the queen of the gods.

According to feminist theories of the replacement of original matriarchies by patriarchies, male sky gods tend to supplant female (motherly) earth goddesses and achieve omnipotence.

== King of the gods in different cultures ==
Examples of kings of the gods in different cultures include:

- In the Mesopotamian Anunnaki, Enlil displaces Anu and is in turn replaced by Marduk.
- In the Ancient Egyptian religion, Amun was the official god of the Pharaoh and the people of Egypt.
- In the Canaanite pantheon, Baal (Hadad) displaces El.
- In the Hurrian/Hittite pantheon, Teshub or Tarḫunz or Arinna displaces Kumarbi.
- In the Armenia, Aramazd.
- In both Hinduism and Vedism, the King of the Gods is Indra, the supreme God and the ruler of heaven. Though in later Hinduism, his status has changed, Indra remains a prominent figure.
- In the Ancient Greek system of Olympian Gods, Cronus displaces Uranus, and Zeus in turn displaces Cronus.
- In Norse mythology, Odin assumes the role as the Allfather or King of the Gods, but Norse mythology has multiple tribes of Gods such as the Æsir and Vanir, and Odin starts off as only the leader of the former.
- In Yoruba religion, Obatala is the King of the Oriṣa (or Gods), but Olorun is the Supreme Being.
- In Zoroastrianism, Ahura Mazda

== List of rulers of pantheons ==
The leaders of the various pantheons include:

- Armenian pantheon: Aramazd
- Arabian pantheon: Hubal
- Ashanti pantheon: Nyame
- Aztec pantheon: Huitzilopochtli, Ometeotl, Quetzalcoatl or Tezcatlipoca
- Basque pantheon: Sugaar or Mari
- Batak pantheon: (primordial) Debata Ompung Mulajadi na Bolon; (celestial) Batara Guru
- Canaanite pantheon: El, later Baʿal (now usually identified with Hadad)
- Punic pantheon: Baʿal Hammon
- Celtic pantheon: (Tuatha Dé Danann) Nuada, Bres, Lugh, Dagda, Delbáeth, Fiacha, Mac Cuill, Mac Cecht, Mac Gréine, Manannán mac Lir, (Fomorians) Conand, Indech, Elatha, Balor (Gaels); (Tylwyth Teg) Gwyn ap Nudd, (Children of Dôn) Lludd Llaw Eraint, Brân the Blessed (Welsh); (possibly, all contested) Rigisamus, Ambisagrus, Taranis, Vellaunus, Lugus (Brythonic/Gallaeci/Gaulish)
- Chinese pantheon: Yuanshi Tianzun, Jade Emperor, Shangdi, Tian
- Circassian pantheon: Theshxwe / Tha
- Dahomey pantheon: Nana Buluku
- Dravidian pantheon: Sivan, Murugan, Kadalon, Vendhan and Kottravai, and Thirumaal
- Egyptian pantheon: Old Kingdom: Ra. New Kingdom: Amun
- Finnic pantheon: Ukko, possibly Ilmarinen
- Germanic pantheon: Odin
- Georgian pantheon: Armazi, Ghmerti
- Gondi pantheon: Kupar Lingo
- Greek pantheon: Zeus
- Hawaiian pantheon: Kāne
- Hindu pantheon: Shiva, Brahma, Vishnu, Indra or Brahman
- Hittite pantheon: Arinna or Teshub
- Inca pantheon: Viracocha
- Inuit pantheon: Anguta or Anigut but only among the Greenlandic Inuit
- Japanese pantheon: Amenominakanushi, Izanagi-no-Mikoto, then Amaterasu-Ōmikami
- Korean pantheon: Haneullim
- Lithuanian pantheon: Perkūnas
- Lusitanian pantheon: Endovelicus
- Mari pantheon: Kugu Jumo
- Māori pantheon: Tāne
- Mayan pantheon: Hunab Ku, Itzamna, Huracan, Kukulkan, Camazotz and Cabrakan.
- Mbuti pantheon: Khonvoum
- Meitei pantheon: Sidaba Mapu or Pakhangba
- Mesopotamian pantheon: Sumerian: An, later Enlil; Babylonian: Marduk
- Nabatean pantheon: Dushara
- Ossetian pantheon: Xucau
- Zoroastrian pantheon: Ahura Mazda
- Philippine pantheon: Bathala (Tagalog), Kan-Laon (Visayan)
- Roman pantheon: Jupiter
- Sami pantheon: Beaivi
- Scythian pantheon: Tabiti
- Slavic pantheon: Perun or Rod or Svarog
- Turco-Mongol pantheon: Tengri, Tngri, Qormusta Tengri, or Kayra
- Vedic Pantheon: Indra
- Vietnamese pantheon: Ông Trời; Lạc Long Quân
- Vodou pantheon: Bondyé
- Yoruba pantheon: Obatala
- Zulu pantheon: Unkulunkulu, Umvelinqangi

== Characteristics ==
The following are the characteristics shared by virtually all Kings of the gods:

- Creation: Most of these gods derive their power from the fact that they created the world, formulated its laws and/or created life forms, notably humans. Examples: Ra, Odin, Obatala.
- Dominion over the sky: Many such deities hold control over all aspects of the sky, such as weather, rain, thunderstorms, air, winds and celestial objects like stars. They also control some aspects of Earth like harvest, fertility, plants or mountains. Examples: Zeus, Hadad, Jupiter.
- Lightning bolts as personal weapons: Commonly seen with sky gods.
- Divine Wisdom: Some Kings of Gods possess superior wisdom and clairvoyance, compared to most beings. Examples: Ra, Odin.
- God of the Sun, Daylight or Celestial Fire: Some kings of gods are associated with the Sun, as it is life giving and is a powerful symbol of order. They are said to be in charge of celestial fire, which is purifying by nature. Daylight is also an important phenomenon, as most events take place under its presence. Examples: Ra, Dyaus Pitr.
- Conquest, Law, Justice, Order, Time and Fate: Most kings of gods have the ability to control the events of battle and grant victory to those who deserve it. They are seen as paragons of law and promote order. They are seen as powerful manifestations of their respective civilizations. Some gods either possess great skill in war or tremendous physical strength. Some of them have some control over time and regulate it with seasons. Others have limited control over the fate of a human. Examples: Zeus, Odin, Ra, Jupiter.
- Divine authority over other gods: This may be because the concerned head of the pantheon is the father or creator of many gods and goddesses who swear allegiance to him. As a result, the king of the gods makes sure that all deities function properly, punish them for misdeeds, grant or take away immortality from lesser gods etc. Examples: Zeus, Odin, Enlil.
- Divine rival: In some cases, there may be another god, who is equal in supernatural power and thinks he can do a better job than the current king. This often results in conflict, and in extreme cases, war. Examples: Ra and Apophis; Osiris, Set and Horus; Apollo vs Python ; Mitra and the Daeva; Zeus and Poseidon; Cronos and Uranus; Typhon and Zeus; etc.

== See also ==
- Henotheism
- Kingship and kingdom of God

== Works cited ==
- Campo, Juan E. (2009). Encyclopedia of Islam. Infobase Publishing. ISBN 978-0-8160-5454-1.
- Hughes, Aaron W. (2013). "Setting the Stage: Pre-Islamic Arabia". Muslim Identities: An Introduction to Islam. Columbia University Press. pp. 17–40. ISBN 978-0-231-53192-4.
