= Neit =

Irish god of war

In Irish mythology Neit (Néit, Nét, Neith) was a god of war. He was the husband of Nemain and/or Fea, and sometimes of Badb. Also grandfather of Balor, he was killed at the legendary Second Battle of Moytura.

== Etymology ==
The name probably derives from the proto-Celtic *nei-t- meaning fighting or passion. A similarly named deity appears on two Celtiberian inscriptions, as a Romanized Mars Neto and as Neito.

== Legacy ==
Neit is described as the uncle of the Dagda, who gave him Ailech Neit (Neit's Stonehouse), which is elsewhere described as the grave of Ahd, son of the Dagda. Ailech Imchell, described as the "bright home of horses" and an envied stronghold, is another place where Aed is said to be buried and which is said to be in the "precinct where dwelt Nemain and Neit." Neit is described as "dangerous" and "son of Indui, king of the north country, lord of horse breeding peoples." Neit's sons include Delbáeth, the father of Elatha, and Esarg, the father of Dian Cecht.
