= Uaithne =

The Dagda's harp in Celtic mythology

In Irish mythology, Uaithne (Old Irish: Úaithne, pronounced [ˈuənʲə]) is Dagda's harp, or rather the Dagda's harper, according to a number of modern translators (cf. § Attestations). (Note: The eDIL under Úaithne(7) gives "The name of the Dagda's harp" (based on TBFr.), but this conflicts with its etnry under cruitt "harper" (citing Fraech).)

== Attestations ==
Úaithne figures as the name of Dagda's harper captured by the Fomorians according to the narrative Cath Maige Tuired ("Second Battle of Mag Tuired"). (Note: Lady Gregory (1910) had "Uaitne" as Dagda's harp, which had two other names. But O'Curry's lecture (1873) wrote Uaithne as "the Daghda's harper" in the main text, but "..is the cruit or harp, of the Dagdha" occurs in the margin.) After this battle, Dagda discovered his harp hanging on a wall, in a feasting-house wherein Bres and his father Elathan were also. The harp had two names, Daur Dá Bláo (Note: var. Daurdabla, Durdabla) ("Oak of Two Meadows" (Note: A.C.L. Brown: "oak of two fields"; Stokes: "Oak of two greens[?]".) (Note: Lady Gregory gave "the Oak of Two Blossoms".)) and Cóir Cetharchair ("Four-Angled Music" (Note: A.C.L. Brown and Stokes: "four-angled music"; Lady Gregory:"the Four Angled Music") or perhaps rather "Four-sided Rectitude" (Note: Gray analyzed into cóir adj. 'proper, fitting, just, true' used as noun + Cetharchair 'four-sided, square, rectangular';) (Note: O'Curry's Lecture explained coir to mean "arrangement, adjustment", but when applied to the instrument, meant "proper tuning or harmonizing of harp".)). On this harp, the Dagda bound the music so that it would not sound until he would call to it by its names. After he called to it, it sprang from the wall of its own accord, came to the Dagda, and killed nine men on its way.

According to the Táin Bó Fraích ("The Cattle-Raid of Fraech"), Úaithne, the Dagda's harper, had three sons by the Bóand of the síthe, and the three sons became harpers themselves, each being named after Úaithne's musical strain, i.e., Goltraige ("weeping-strain"), Gentraige ("laughing-strain") and Súantraige ("sleeping-strain"). (Note: Text: Meid ed. or Crowe ed.; Translations: Crowe (1870) and Leahy (1906) interpret Úaithne as "harp", but Crowe admits the possibility of "harper". Gantz (1981) gives "Úaithne, the Dagdae's harper".) (Note: The "-s" are dropped from Meid ed. "Goltraiges & Gentraiges & Súantraiges". as according to commentaries. Gantz renders as "Goltrade, Gentrade and Súantrade". Crowe's endnote gives "Sorrow-strain", "Joy-strain" and "Sleep-strain".)

The TBF narrative further explains: "The time the woman (Bóand) was at the bearing of children it had a cry of sorrow with the soreness of the pangs at first: it was smile and joy it played in the middle for the pleasure of bringing forth the two sons: it was a sleep of soothingness played the last son, on account of the heaviness of the birth, so that it is from him that the third of the music has been named". (Note: Mary Jone's version, unchanged from Leahy's translation, in turn revised from Crowe's. Using Gantz's translation is cumbersome as it skips the phrase concerning lámnad "act of giving birth, parturition" occurring here.)

== Etymology ==
Úaithne presumably means "Childbirth".

Úaithne is glossed as "Orpheus" in the Irish Glossaries. The word has multiple meanings beside Dagda's harp.

Úaithne can also mean "concord in music" and Philippe Jouët endorses the interpretation that Dagda's harp indeed means "concordance" or "harmoniousness", which would be consistent with interpreting the byname Cóir Cetharchair as "quadrangular harmony". Jouët also notes that since Uaithne (Uaitniu) could mean "wood", "work", "pillar" or "harmony", those different meanings could be the consequence of successive metaphors.

== In popular culture ==
"An Uaithne" is also the original name of Irish choir Anúna.

Appears in the Symphogear anime series as a relic owned by Carol Malus Dienheim.
