= Cethlenn =

Mythological Irish prophetess

In Irish mythology, Caitlín (Old Irish: Cethlenn, Cethleann, Ceithlenn, Ceithlionn) was the wife of Balor of the Fomorians and, by him, the mother of Ethniu. She was also a prophetess and warned Balor of his impending defeat by the Tuatha Dé Danann in the second battle of Magh Tuiredh. During that battle she wounded the Dagda with a projectile weapon. She was also known by the nickname Cethlenn of the Crooked Teeth.

== Name ==
Ceithlinn in modern Irish is pronounced like "Kehlen", and her name is sometimes indicated by that spelling. Kethlenda is the form of the name that appeared in Roderick O'Flaherty's Ogygia or Rerum Hibernicarum Chronologia, written in Latin, reused as "Kethlenda of the Crooked Teeth" by story-reteller P. W. Joyce. (Note: In "The Fairy Palace of the Quicken Trees", which is his translation of Bruidhean Chaorthainn.)

Nickname

Ceithlinn is called by the nickname Ceithlion Chaisfhiaclach "the crooked toothed" in the Oidheadh Chloinne Tuireann, (Note: As noted by W. G. Wood-Martin (1884) in connection with "Ceithlean".) also translatable as "twisted teeth", from Irish cas 'twisted'. She is also glossed as being "buck-toothed".

Ceitleann Chraos-Fhiaclach is the slightly different form of the nickname that occurs in the Fenian cycle story Bruidhean Chaorthainn ("The Fairy Palace of the Quicken Trees", "Rowan Tree Palace", "The Story of the Rowan Tree Dwelling"). The headword, craos (Old Irish: cráes) can mean a 'gap, gaping, yawning', as well as 'voraciousness', but Pearse has accepted the latter sense, and glosses the name as "ravening tooth". This Ceaithlann also appears in Scottish copies of this tale.

== Attestations ==
=== Battle of Mag Tuired ===
Cethlenn is unmentioned in the narrative Cath Maige Tuired, as she is not listed in the roster of Fomorians compiled by Whitley Stokes . (Note: Except she is mentioned by Stokes under Balor's entry.)

But in this Battle of Mag Tuired (The Second Battle of Moytura), Cethlenn hurled a javelin (gae) at the Dagda giving him a mortal wound, as recorded in theLebor Gabála Érenn. It took 120 years before the Dagda died of the wound. (Note: Since the LGE states that Lugh was subsequently in kingship for 40 years, and the Dagda for another 80 years.)

The recounting of Cethlenn injuring the Dagda is repeated in the Annals of the Four Masters, Keating's History, and O'Flaherty's Ogygia.

Cethlenn presumably fell in battle, or so it has been commented on by John O'Mahony without clarification of source.

=== Enniskillen ===
Some local historians in the 20th century and after refer to a legend that the Cethlenn was injured and swam to Enniskillen on Loch Erne, Co. Fermanagh, where she died. The suggestion that Enniskillen is eponymous after Cethlenn is made in the early 17th century Annals of Clonmacnoise, though nothing about her swimming there is remarked on by 19th century writers. The present-day town is still situated on a river island. The town centre can only be accessed by crossing a bridge from the surrounding mainland. The town was the location of an island fortress on the River Erne once maintained by the Maguire of Fermanagh and the castle river gate entrance still stands.

According to local lore, the town has taken the name of a smaller island, Innis Cethlenn, located just south of today's East Bridge. It was long ago foretold that if the island was flooded by Erne waters, it would fall to its enemies. Just before the Flight of the Earls (the old Gaelic rulers) the island did flood and the town of Enniskillen fell to the English. In the nineteenth century the Enniskillen borough took measures to prevent the town ever being taken by an enemy again, by filling in the narrow waterway between the smaller island and the mainland. At the same time, the island's elevation was raised to the level of the mainland with earth filling enclosed inside a stone wall. This piece of ground can still be seen, home now to a stand of mature chestnut trees that overhang the river. Innis Cethleen is still enclosed by the stone wall that has prevented it flooding for the past two centuries.

Énrí Ó Muirgheasa suggested that this area (Breifne) which is the nexus between Ulster and Connacht should be investigated as the genuine location where the Balor legend was localized, rather than Tory Island.

=== Balor's wife ===
Cethlenn is not explicitly called Balor's wife in the LGE, (Note: Or the Annals, or by Keating.) but it is thus stated in the Ogygia (1685). (Note: And the Ogygia for some reason considers her Lug's great-grand aunt rather than his grandmother.) (Note: O'Donovan also footnotes she is Balor's wife. O'Donovan heavily consulted the Ogygia.)

=== Prognostication ===
In the early modern Romance Oidheadh Chloinne Tuireann (OCT), Balor's wife (Céithlionn or Ceithlinn) identifies Lug as their grandson, and proclaims that once he comes into Erin, the days that they the Fomorians will remain in power are at an end.

Arthur C. L. Brown remarks on this prediction that comes true in the form of Balor's destruction by Lugh, but prefers not to make connection to the ancient version of the Cath Maige Tuired in which Lug uses a sling stone as the lethal weapon, but rather to a folktale version in which Lugh uses a spear crafted by a particular swordsmith named Gavnin Gow.

== Eponyms ==
The town of Enniskillen (Irish inis Cethlinn, "Cethlenn's island") in County Fermanagh, Northern Ireland is named after her.

It has also been suggested that the name of Cethlenn may have influenced the name "Cathaleen's Fall(s)" used for the Assaroe Falls in County Donegal. This name is now used for the hydroelectric dam built at that location.
