= Allfather =

Allfather or All-father may refer to:

- Allfather, or Alföðr, a name of Odin, a central god in Germanic paganism
- Allfather D'Aronique, a fictional character from Preacher
- The Dagda, known as all-father, an important god in Irish mythology

== See also ==
- God the Father
- King of the Gods
- Creator deity
- Sky father
- El (deity)
- Zeus
- Jupiter (mythology)
