= Áed Minbhrec =

Áed Minbhrec is the son of the Dagda who was murdered by Coincheann.

Áed was wrongly accused of seducing the wife of Coincheann, which led to his death at Coincheann's hands. The Dagda discovered what happened but was unable to bring Áed back to life. He demanded that Coincheann paid an honor price to him in the form of having to carry Áed's remains until he could find a boulder big enough to cover the corpse.

In one version, Áed Minbhrec survived the attempt and rules over his fairy mound at Mullaghnasee, near Ballyshannon, Ireland.

== See also ==
- Celtic mythology
