= Ethniu =

Female figure in Irish mythology

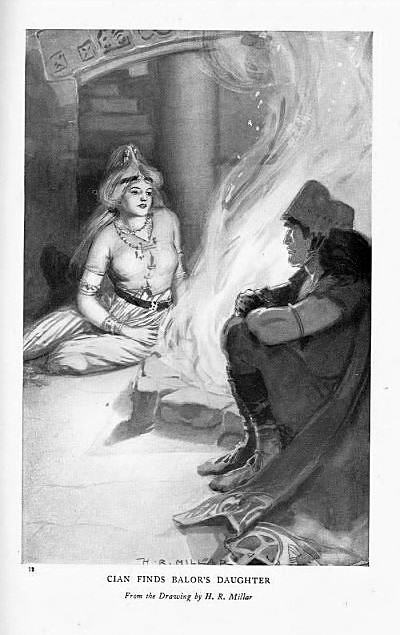
Cian Finds Balor's Daughter, drawing by H. R. Millar, c. 1905.

In Irish mythology, Ethniu (Old Irish: [ˈeθʲnʲu]); Modern Irish: Eithne (pronounced [ˈɛhnʲə]), is the daughter of the Fomorian leader Balor, and the mother of Lugh. She is also referred to as Ethliu (Modern Irish: Eithle).

== Name ==
Ethniu is a fine example of the difficulty of conducting research into Irish mythology. The oldest version of her name is probably Ethliu or Ethniu, giving rise to the modern Irish name Eithne. However thanks to changes in the Irish language, the lack of standardised spelling for many centuries, and attempts to anglicise the name, variations have arisen. Linguistic ignorance has further confused the issue: the genitive form of Ethniu is Ethnenn (modern Eithneann) and the genitive of Ethliu is Ethlenn/Ethlinn (modern Eithleann, Eithlinne), as in mac Ethlenn ("Ethliu's son"). This genitive has often been taken for a nominative, or a mistaken nominative has been inferred.

Variations and anglicizations include: Ethnea, Eithliu, Ethlend, Ethnen, Ethlenn, Ethnenn, Ethne, Aithne, Enya, Lily, Aine, Ena, Etney, Eithnenn, Eithlenn, Eithna, Ethni, Edlend, and Edlenn.

In the "Wooing of Étaín", we are told that Eithne's other name is Boand and in the Banshenchas Ethniu's "true name" is revealed to be Feada.

== Relationships ==
Eithne is the daughter of Balor and mother of Lugh. In some traditions Eithne is the daughter of Delbáeth, the mother of the Dagda and Ogma, and the wife of Nuada Airgetlám. In a variant version of the birth of Aengus, she is the wife of Elcmar who is seduced by the Dagda: as such she may be a double, and is explicitly named as such, of Boann, who plays that role in the best-known version of the tale.

Although in most texts she is a female figure, there are some in which Ethniu is a male name. In the ancient text Baile in Scáil ("The Phantom's Ecstatic Vision"), Lugh is said to the son of "Ethliu son of Tigernmas", or the son of "Ethniu son of Smretha son of Tigernmas". James Bonwick identifies Tigernmas, the king who introduced the worship of Crom Cruach, with Balor. R. A. Stewart Macalister also suggests that Cethlenn is originally a variant of Ethlenn arising from the frequent identification of Lugh as Lugh Mac Ethlenn (thus Mac Ethlenn → Mac Cethlenn).

== Mythology ==
Her union with Lugh's father, Cian (Cían) of the Tuatha Dé Danann, is presented in early texts as a simple dynastic marriage, but later folklore preserves a more involved tale, similar to the birth of Perseus in Greek mythology. A folktale recorded by John O'Donovan in 1835 tells how Balor, in an attempt to avoid a druid's prophecy that he will be killed by his own grandson, imprisons Ethniu in a tower on Tory Island away from all contact with men.

Mac Cinnfhaelaidh (Cían), whose magical cow was stolen by Balle, gains access to Ethniu's tower, with the magical help of the leanan sídhe Biróg, and seduces her. Ethniu gives birth to triplets, but Balor gathers them up in a sheet and sends a messenger to drown them in a whirlpool. The messenger drowns two of the babies, but unwittingly drops one in the harbour, where he is rescued by Biróg. She takes the child back to his father, who gives him to his brother, Gavida the smith, in fosterage. The boy grows up to kill Balor.

By comparison with texts like Cath Maige Tuired and the Lebor Gabála Érenn, the unnamed boy is evidently Lugh, and his father, Mac Cinnfhaelaidh, is a stand-in for Cian. The Banshenchas states that her real name was Feada: "Feada was the real name of noble Ethne who was wife of strong stout Cain, and mother of Lug the impetuous superman, and daughter of swift smiting Balor son of Dod son of mighty Net a greater man than pleasant Hector. From him is famed the cairn at Ath Feindead because he fought a duel."

The Fosterage of the Houses of the Two Methers has St. Patrick saying of Eithne:

I shall leave these virtues
for the story of Eithne from the fair Maigue.
Success in children, success in foster-sister or brother,
to those it may find sleeping with fair women.

If you tell of the fosterage
before going in a ship or vessel,
you will come safe and prosperous
without danger from waves and billows.

If you tell of the fosterage
(before going to a) judgment or a hunting,
your case will be (prosperous),
all will be submissive before you.

To tell the story of Eithne
when bringing home a stately wife,
good the step you have decided on,
it will be a success of spouse and children.

Tell the story of noble Ethne
before going into a new banqueting house,
(you will be) without bitter fight or folly,
without the drawing of valiant, pointed weapons.

Tell to a king of many followers
the story of Ethne to a musical instrument,
he gets no cause to repent it,
provided he listen without conversation.

If you tell this story
to the captives of Ireland,
it will be the same as if were opened
their locks and their bonds.

== Popular culture ==
- Ethniu is the primary antagonist of Peace Talks and Battle Ground (2020) by Jim Butcher, where she spearheads a Fomor invasion of Chicago.
