= Brigid =

Gaelic goddess

Brigit
- Member of the Tuatha Dé Danann
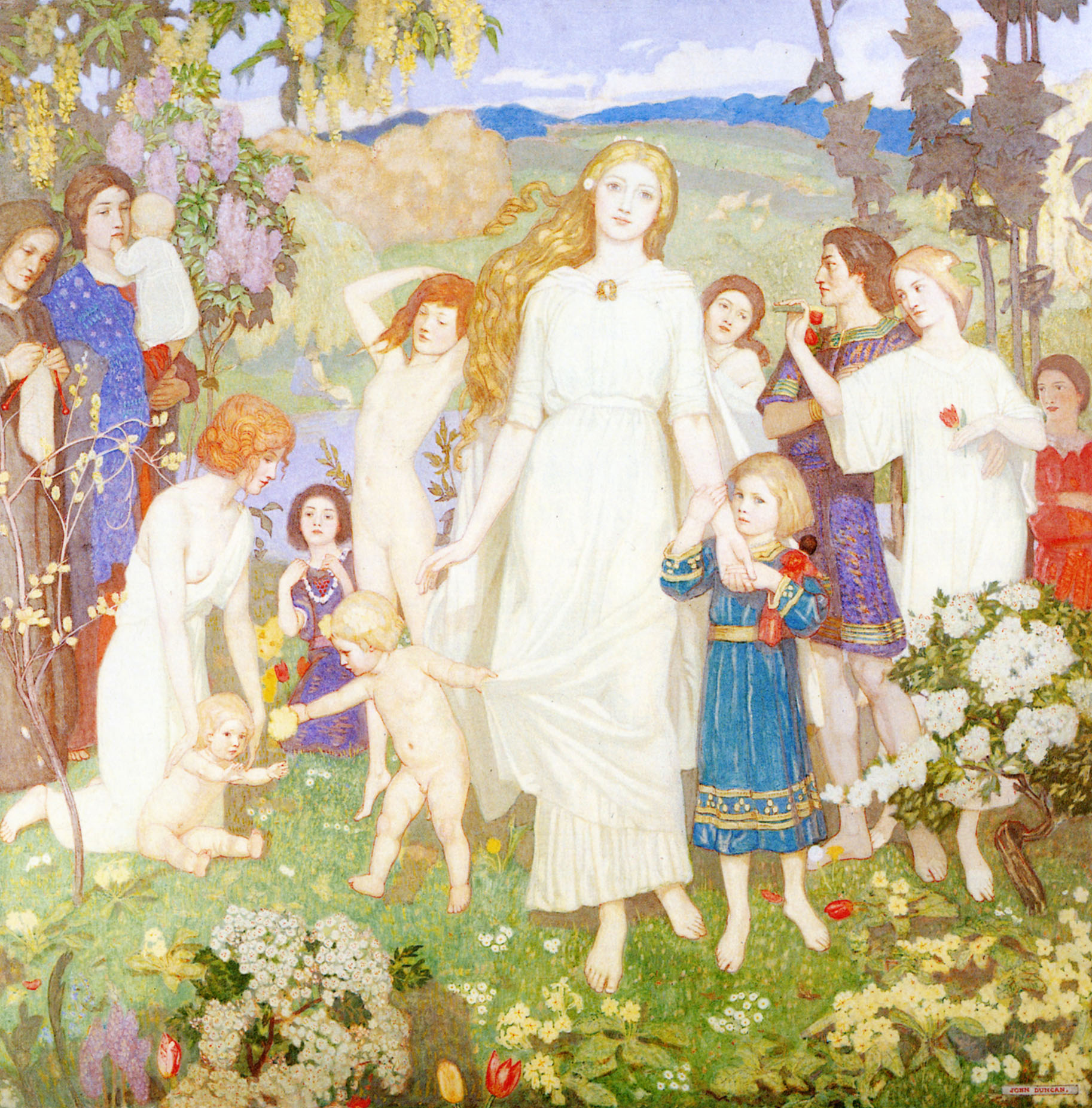
- "The Coming of Bríde" by John Duncan (1917)
- Symbols: Brigid's cross, flaming torches, Cows (particularly white cows), Serpents, Swans, Bees, Oak trees, Dandelions, Wells
- Texts: Lebor Gabála Érenn, Cath Maige Tuired, Cormac's Glossary

Genealogy
- Parents: Dagda
- Siblings: Cermait, Aengus, Aed, Bodb Derg, Brigid the Healer, Brigid the Smith

Brigid or Brigit (/ˈbrɪdʒɪd, ˈbriːɪd/ BRIJ-id, BREE-id, Irish: [ˈbʲɾʲiːdʲ]; meaning 'exalted one'), also Bríg, is a goddess of pre-Christian Ireland. She appears in Irish mythology as a member of the Tuatha Dé Danann, the daughter of the Dagda and wife of Bres, with whom she had a son named Ruadán.

She is associated with wisdom, poetry, healing, protection, smithing and domesticated animals. Cormac's Glossary, written in the 9th century by Christian monks, says that Brigid was "the goddess whom poets adored" and that she had two sisters: Brigid the healer and Brigid the smith. This suggests she may have been a triple deity. She is also thought to have some relation to the British Celtic goddess Brigantia.

Saint Brigid shares many of the goddess's attributes and her feast day, 1 February, was originally a festival called Imbolc. It has thus been argued that the saint is a Christianization of the goddess, or that the lore of the goddess was transferred to her, and that Imbolc was originally associated with the goddess.

== Name ==
Middle Irish Brigit [ˈbʲɾʲiʝidʲ] evolved into early modern Irish Brighid [bʲɾʲiːdʲ] and, after a spelling reform in 1948, the spelling was standardised as Bríd [bʲɾʲiːdʲ]. The earlier form gave rise to various forms in the languages of Europe, starting from the Medieval Latin Brigida, and from there to English Bridget, French Brigitte, Swedish Birgitta or Birgit and Finnish Piritta.

The name comes from Proto-Celtic *Brigantī and means "the high one" or "the exalted one". It is cognate with the name of the ancient British goddess Brigantia, with whom Brigid is thought to have some relation. It is also cognate with the Old High German personal name Burgunt, and the Sanskrit word Bṛhatī (बृहती) "high", an epithet of the Hindu dawn goddess Ushas. The ultimate source is Proto-Indo-European *bʰr̥ǵʰéntih₂ (feminine form of *bʰérǵʰonts, "high"), derived from the root *bʰerǵʰ- ("to rise"). Xavier Delamarre, citing E. Campanile, suggests that Brigid could be a continuation of the Indo-European dawn goddess.

== In early Irish literature ==
Sanas Cormaic (Cormac's Glossary), written by Christian scribes in the 9th century and based on earlier sources, has an entry for Brigit. It says she was a goddess of the elite poet-seers (the filí) and that she had two sisters, Brigit the goddess of healing and Brigit the goddess of smithing, all of whom are daughters of the Dagda:

"Brigit ... the female seer or woman of insight, i.e. the goddess whom poets (filid) used to worship, for her cult was very great and very splendid. It is for this reason that they call her the goddess of poets by this title, and her sisters were Brigit the woman of leechcraft, and Brigit the woman of smithcraft, i.e. the goddesses i.e. three daughters of the Dagda are they.

It explains that from these, all the Irish have a goddess called Brigit; suggesting that it "may have been more of a title than a personal name".

The Lebor Gabála Érenn, first compiled in the 11th century, also calls Brigit a poetess and daughter of the Dagda. It says she has two oxen, Fea and Femen, from whom are named Mag Fea (a plain on the River Barrow) and Mag Femin (a plain on the River Suir). Elsewhere, these are called the oxen of Dil, "radiant of beauty". It also says she possesses the "king of boars", Torc Triath (from whom the plain of Treithirne is named), and the "king of wethers", Cirb (from whom the plain of Cirb is named). The animals were said to cry out whenever plundering was committed in Ireland. This suggests Brigid was a guardian goddess of domesticated animals.

The "Judgments of Bríg" (Bretha Bríg) are 8th–9th century glosses added to the Senchas Már, a collection of early Irish law tracts. They are adjustments to customary laws to allow for the special needs of women. The texts ascribe these to the mythical Bríg Brethach ("Bríg of the Judgments"), who is said to be the wife of the legendary judge and poet Sencha. In the Ulster sagas of Irish mythology, Bríg Brethach is one of a trio, along with Sencha's mother Bríg Briugu ("Bríg the hostel-keeper") and his daughter Bríg Ambue ("Bríg the propertiless").

In Cath Maige Tuired, Bríg is the wife of Bres and bears him a son, Ruadán, whose name is related to the word for "red". The story says she began the custom of keening, a combination of wailing and singing, while mourning the death of Ruadán. She is credited in the same passage with inventing a whistle used for night travel.

== Brigid and Saint Brigid ==
Historians suggest that the goddess Brigid was syncretized with the Christian saint of the same name. According to medievalist Pamela Berger, Christian monks "took the ancient figure of the mother goddess and grafted her name and functions onto her Christian counterpart," Brigid of Kildare. The saint's hagiographies "are mainly anecdotes and miracle stories, some of which are deeply rooted in Irish pagan folklore". Dáithí Ó hÓgáin wrote that the melding of pagan goddess and Christian saint can be seen in some of the saint's miracles, where she multiplies food, bestows cattle and sheep, controls the weather, and is linked with fire or thermal springs.

The goddess and saint have many of the same associations. Saint Brigid is considered a patroness of healers, poets, blacksmiths, livestock and dairy workers, as well as serpents (in Scotland) and the arrival of spring. Kim McCone points out that Sanas Cormaic says the three Brigids were patronesses of poetry/prophecy, healing/medicine, and smithing. Meanwhile, Saint Brigid is linked with the poet Dubthach maccu Lugair, the physician Áed mac Bricc, and the master smith Conleth.

Fea and Femen, the oxen of the goddess Brigid, are associated with the area of southeastern Ireland where Ptolemy places the Brigantes tribe in the 2nd century. In Britain, the Brigantes are associated with the goddess Brigantia, whose name is cognate with Brigid. Meanwhile, Saint Brigid is strongly associated with the province of Leinster in southeastern Ireland.

In the late 12th century, Gerald of Wales wrote that nineteen nuns took turns in keeping a perpetual fire burning at Kildare in honour of Saint Brigid, and that this fire was kept burning since Brigid's time. It has been suggested this fire originally belonged to a temple of Brigit the goddess. The Roman goddess Vesta and the Greek goddess Hestia had perpetual fires tended by priestesses. According to Gerald, it was ringed by a hedge that no man was allowed to cross, lest he be cursed.

The saint is associated with many holy wells and clootie wells in Ireland and Britain, where small strips of cloth or ribbons are left as part of a healing ritual. Celtic healing goddesses, such as Sirona and Coventina, were often associated with sacred springs.

This theory is contested, however, with scholars including Elva Johnston arguing that the significance of the pagan goddess has been exaggerated at the saint's expense. Johnston wrote "the argument for the priority of the goddess over the saint depends on three interrelated points: firstly, that [Saint] Brigit is not real, secondly that her lives betray that they are an attempt to euhemerise a pagan deity, and finally an underlying assumption that a goddess cult is more empowering for the women of ancient and, by analogy, contemporary Ireland".

Saint Brigid's Day is 1 February. It was originally Imbolc, the first day of spring in Irish tradition. Because Saint Brigid has been linked to the goddess Brigid, the festival of Imbolc is commonly associated with the goddess.

A tholus on Venus was named after Brigit by the International Astronomical Union in 1985. As the planetary nomenclature rules prohibit the use of national figures and religious figures from contemporary religions, this is a reference to the goddess rather than the saint.

== Neo-paganism ==
Brigid is an important figure for some modern pagans, who emphasize her triple aspect. She is sometimes worshipped in conjunction with Lugh or Cernunnos.

== See also ==
- Saint Bridget
- Brigid's cross
- List of Irish-language given names
- Saraswati
- Maman Brigitte
- Perchta
- Athena
