= Four Treasures of the Tuatha Dé Danann =

Four magical items supposedly brought by the Tuatha Dé Danann to Ireland

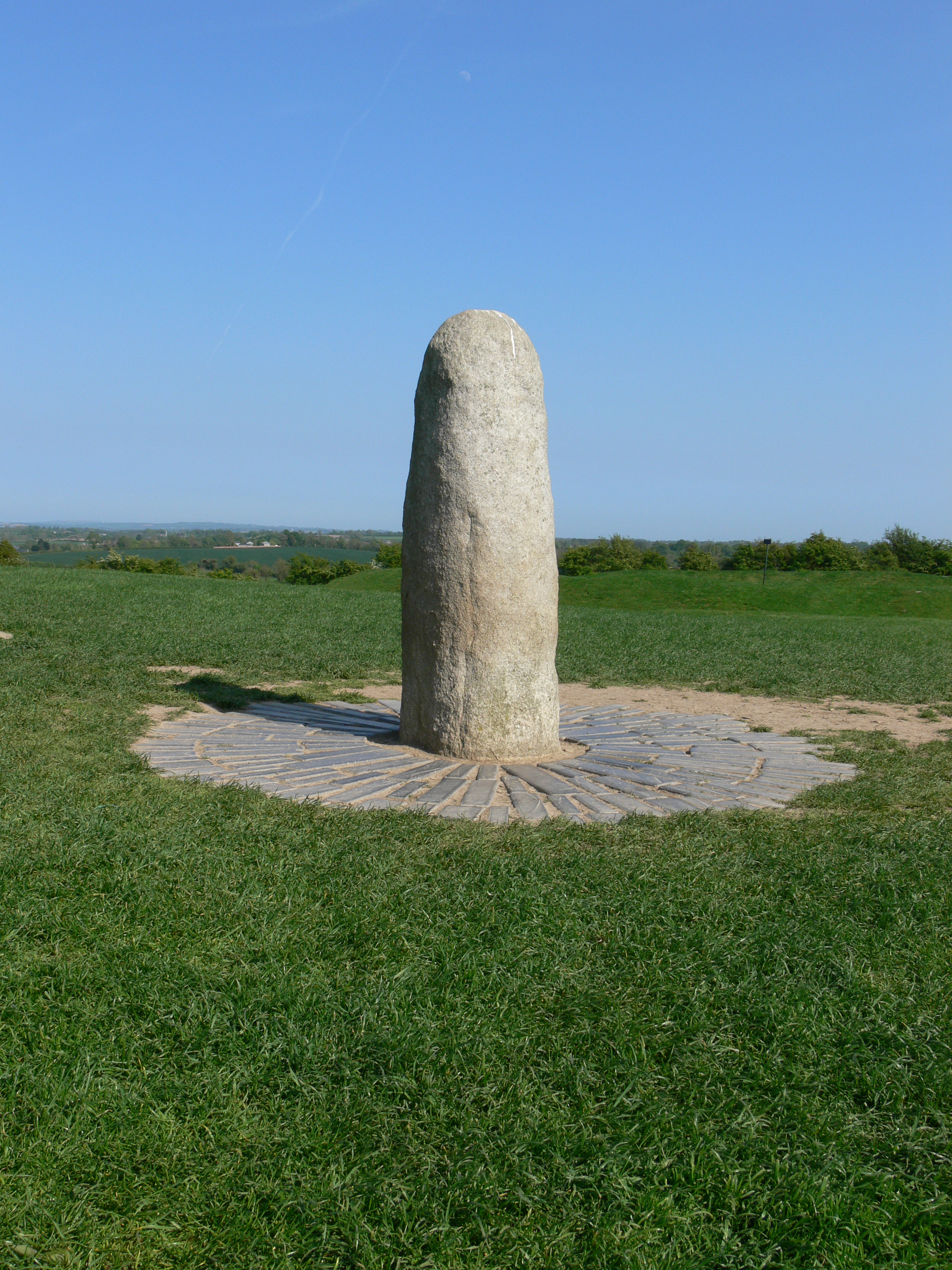
Lia Fáil as it stands on Tara

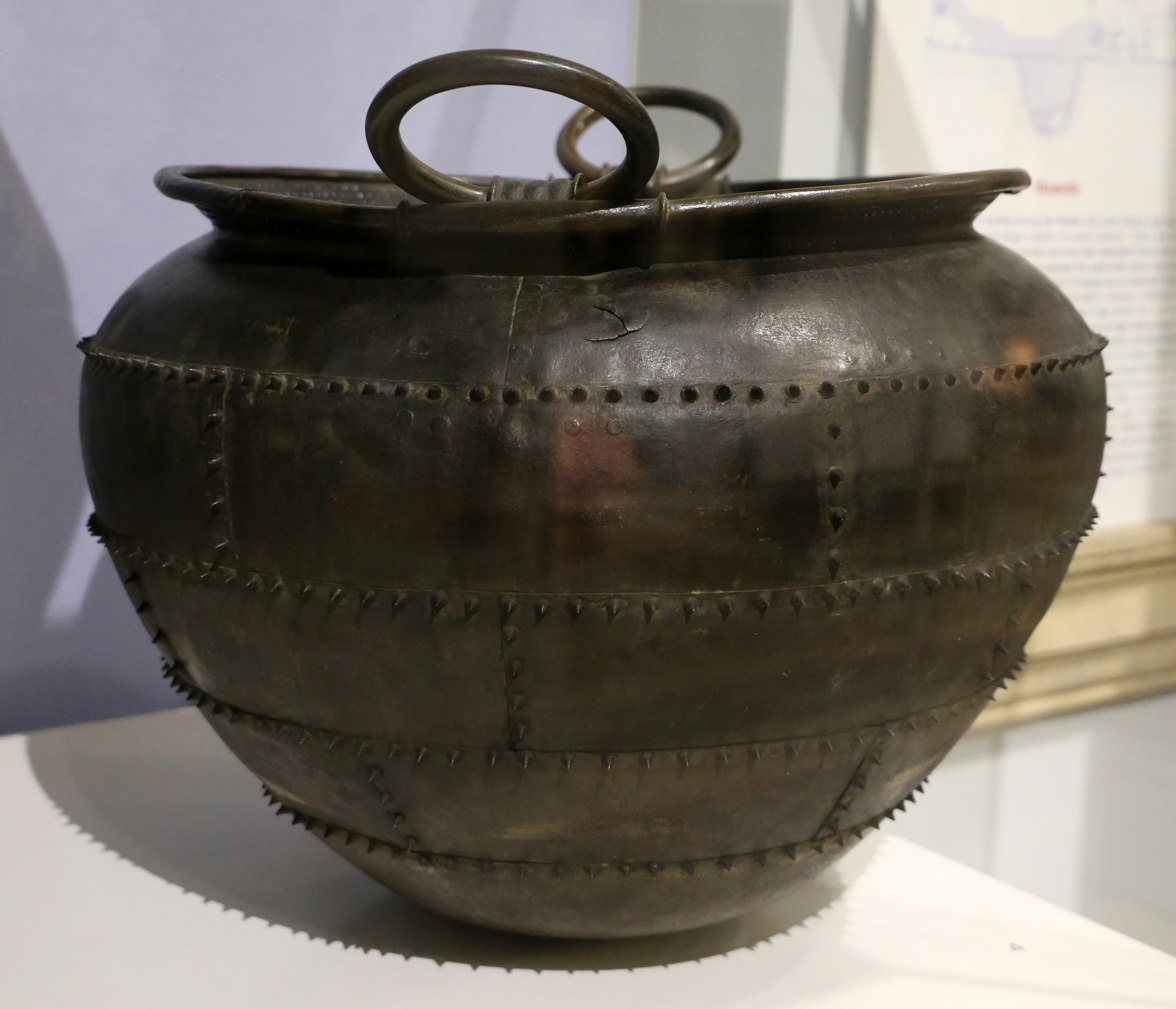
Bronze cauldron from County Tyrone, c. 900–500 BC

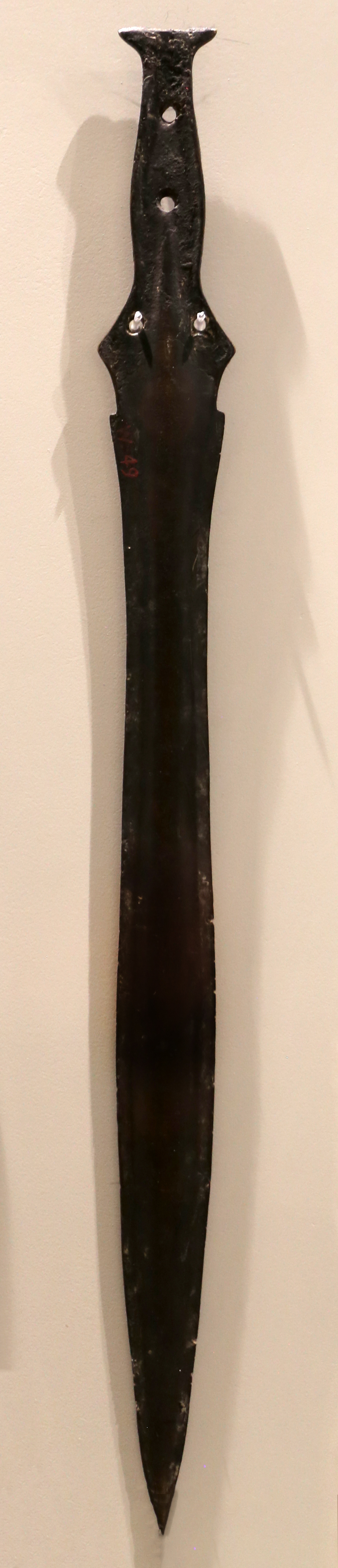
Bronze sword from County Laois, c. 8th century BC

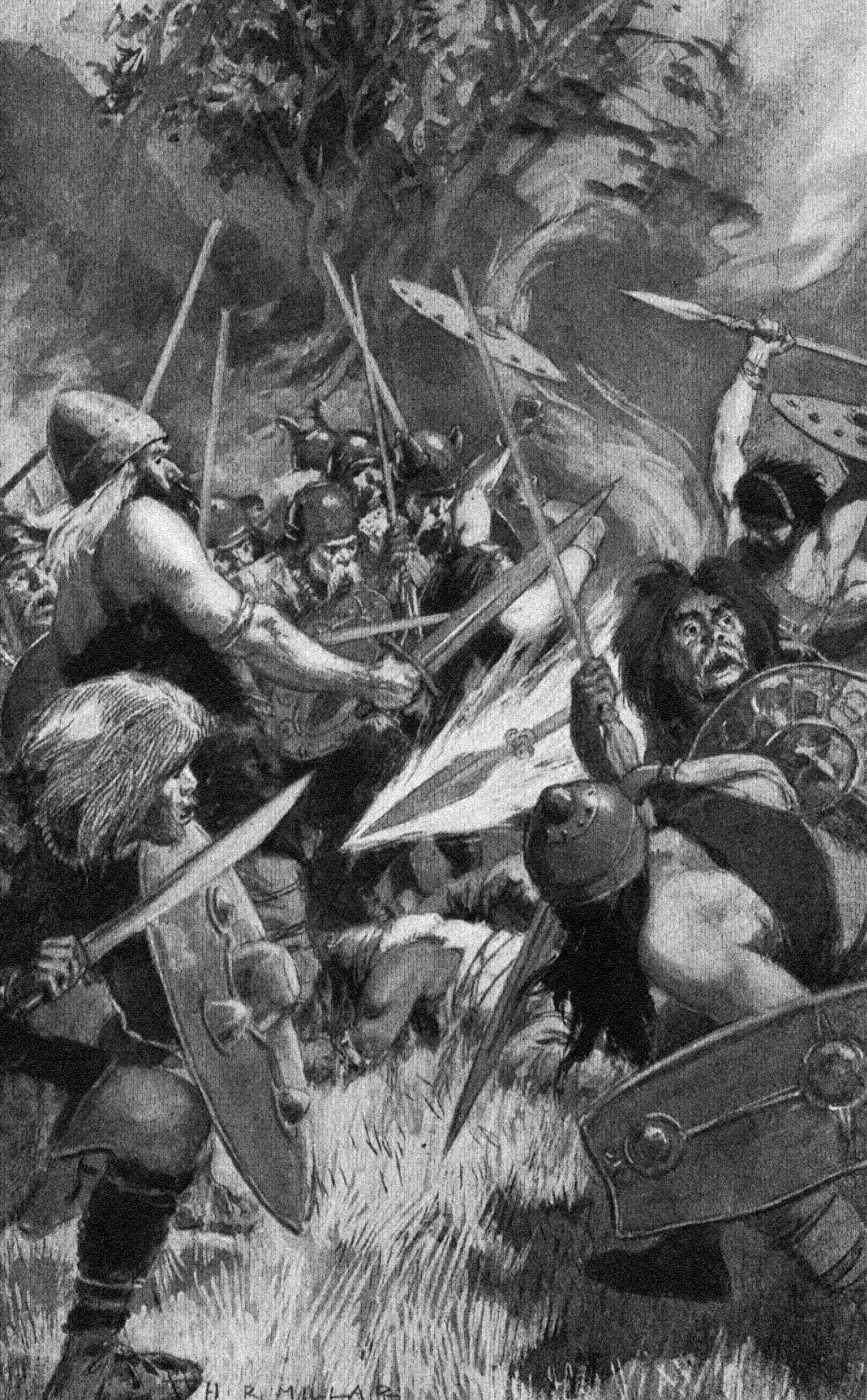
Spear of Lugh (H. R. Millar, 1905)

Representative images of the four treasures

In the Mythological Cycle of early Irish literature, the four treasures of the Tuatha Dé Danann are four magical items which the mythological Tuatha Dé Danann are supposed to have brought with them from the four island cities Murias, Falias, Gorias, and Findias when they arrived in Ireland.

== Sources ==
Together the four treasures form the subject of at least three Middle Irish texts:

- an anecdote in an interpolated recension of the legendary Lebor Gabála Érenn ("The Book of the Taking of Ireland"), here LG,
- the introduction, interpolated from Lebor Gabála, of Cath Maige Tuired ("The Second Battle of Mag Tuired"), here CMT, and
- "The Four Jewels", a later, short text in the Yellow Book of Lecan, consisting of a prose introduction and a poem.

In the 17th century, Geoffrey Keating drew on a version of the former for his Foras Feasa ar Éirinn.

== Summary ==
The first recension of Lebor Gabála describes the Tuatha Dé Danann as having resided in "the northern islands of the world", where they were instructed in the magic arts, before finally moving in dark clouds to Connaught in Ireland. It mentions only the Lia Fáil as having been imported from across the sea.

One of the recensions of Lebor Gabála, Cath Maige Tuired and a separate text elaborate on these events. CMT and LG tell that there were four cities located on the northern islands of the world (i n-insib tūascertachaib in domain), called Falias, Gorias, Findias and Murias. "The Four Jewels" also refers to the cities, but appears to locate them at Lochlann and contends that the Tuatha Dé crossed the seas in their fleet rather than in a mist. The Tuatha Dé Danann—described as the offspring of Béothach son of Iarbonel—landed here claito be instructed in the magic arts, embracing druidry (druidecht), knowledge (fis), prophecy (fáitsine) and skill in magic (amainsecht). Each island is said to have had its poet (fili) who was skilled in occult arts.

When the Tuatha Dé migrated to Ireland, they are said to have brought four magical instruments from these cities:

Treasures of the Tuatha Dé
City	Poet	Item	Properties
Falias	Morfessa or Fessus	Stone of Fál (Lia Fáil)	It would cry out beneath the king who took the sovereignty of Ireland. It was supposedly located near the Hill of Tara in County Meath.
Goirias or Gorias	Esras	Spear (sleg) of Lugh	No battle was ever sustained against it or against the man who held it.
Findias or Finias	Uiscias or Uscias	Sword (claideb/claiomh) which belonged to Núada	No one ever escaped from it once it was drawn from its sheath, and no one could resist it. The sword is also described in the Tain legend as "Nuadu's Cainnel"—a glowing bright torch.
Muirias or Murias	Semias	Cauldron (coire) of the Dagda	No company ever went away from it unsatisfied (also known as the Coire ansic, 'never-dry cauldron').

A. C. L. Brown and R. S. Loomis equate Lug's spear with the Lúin of Celtchar, which in Togail Bruidne Dá Derga is said to have been discovered in the Battle of Mag Tuired. There is however no sign of a literary tradition which connects the two weapons. A different spear belonging to Lug is the so-called spear of Assal in Oidheadh Chloinne Tuireann. It was brought back to Lug by the sons of Tuireann in atonement for their killing of Cian.

== See also ==
- Thirteen Treasures of the Island of Britain

== Sources ==
- Lebor Gabála Érenn, ed. and tr. R.A.S. Macalister. Lebor Gabála Érenn: The Book of the Taking of Ireland. Part IV. Irish Texts Society 41. London, 1941. Section VII, § 304–5. Portion of the text reproduced here.
- Cath Maige Tuired, ed. and tr. Elizabeth A. Gray, Cath Maige Tuired: The Second Battle of Mag Tuired. Irish Texts Society 52. Kildare, 1982.
- "The Four jewels", Middle Irish poem with prose introduction in the Yellow Book of Lecan, ed. and tr. Vernam Hull. "The four jewels of the Tuatha Dé Danann." Zeitschrift für celtische Philologie 18 (1930): 73–89. Edition available from CELT. Translation available here (Mary Jones) and here (proof-corrected). Hull's article includes commentary.
- Geoffrey Keating, Foras feasa ar Éirinn. The History of Ireland by Geoffrey Keating, ed. and tr. D. Comyn and P.S. Dinneen, Foras Feasa ar Éirinn le Seathrún Céitinn. 4 vols: vols 1–3. Irish Texts Society 4, 8 and 9. London: David Nutt, 1902–1914.
