= Bodb Derg =

Irish mythological figure

In Irish mythology, Bodb Derg (Old Irish, pronounced [ˌboðβ ˈd̠ʲeɾɡ]) or Bodhbh Dearg (Middle Irish and Modern Irish, pronounced [ˌbˠoːw ˈdʲaɾˠəɡ]) was a son of Eochaid Garb or the Dagda, and the Dagda's successor as King of the Tuatha Dé Danann.

== Name ==
The name Bodb could be a cognate of "bádhbh" as it has a similar pronunciation; Bodb Derg would then mean 'Red Crow'. Given the fluidity of Old Irish scribal practice, the name of the female mythological character Badb was occasionally spelled Bodb as well.

== Mythology ==
Aengus asks for his brother Bodb's help in finding the woman of his dreams in "Aislinge Óenguso" (the Dream of Aengus). At the time, Bodb is king of the síde of Munster. Bodb successfully identifies the woman as Caer Ibormeith.

Following the Tuatha Dé Danann's defeat in the battle of Tailtiu, Bodb is elected king of the Tuatha Dé Danann in the "Children of Lir", just as the Tuatha Dé are going underground to dwell in the sídhe. The principle justification given for Bodb's election is that he is the Dagda's eldest son. He subsequently fathered many deities. Bodb's election is recognised by all of his rivals, save only Lir, who refuses him homage. Bodb, however, counsels his followers to forbear from punishing Lir; later, Bodb will successively offer two of his own daughters in marriage to Lir to placate him. Both marriages, however, end unhappily.

In variants of the story, Manannan is named the high king over the Tuatha Dé along with Bodb Derg when the Tuatha Dé Danann descend into the sidhe; Manannan is called “chief of the kings” and owner of every sidhe and divides the sidhe mounds amongst the Tuatha Dé.

As king of the Munster síde with Lén as his smith, Bodb Sída ar Femen ('of the Mound on Femen') plays a role in an important prefatory tale to Táin Bó Cuailnge, for it is his swineherd who quarrels with that of the king of the Connacht síde; the swineherds are later swallowed and reborn as the magical bulls Donn Cuailnge and Finnbennach, of which the former was the object of the great cattle-raid.

In one Fenian tale, Bodb leads the Tuatha Dé Danann to the aid of the Fianna at the Battle of Ventry.
