= Ogma =

God from Irish mythology

- Speech and language, as well as eloquence and learning
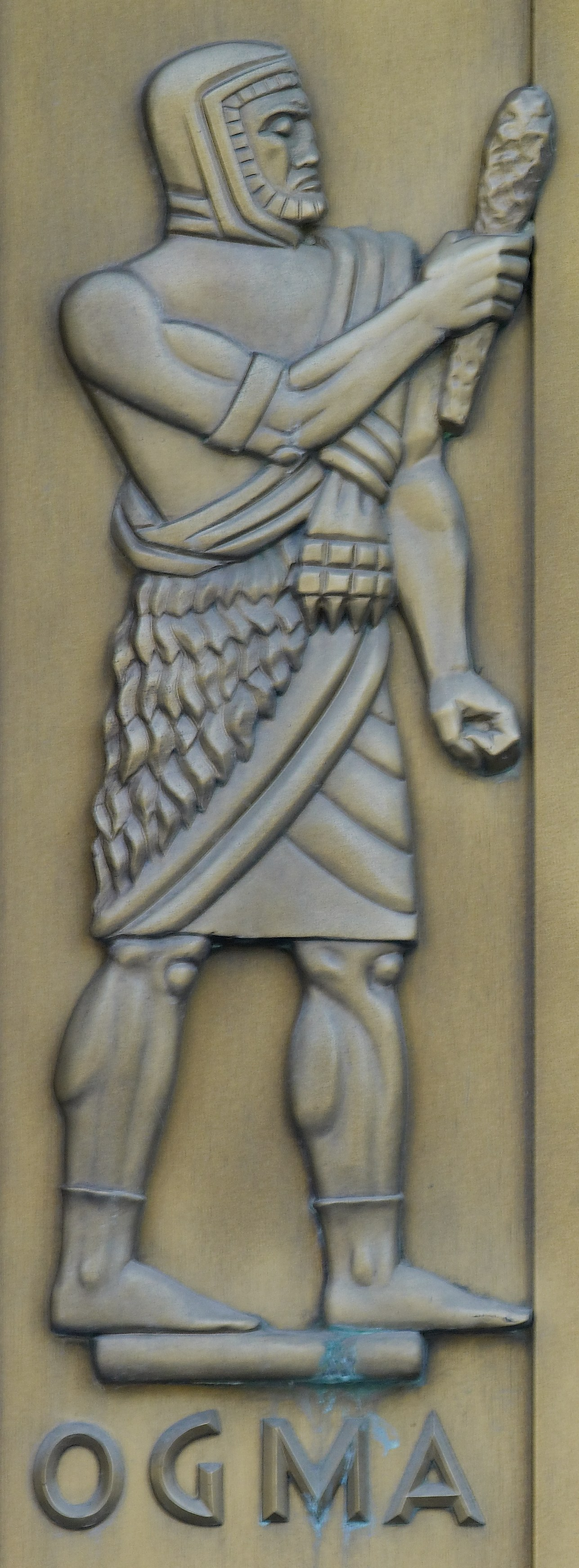
- Lee Lawrie, sculpted bronze figure of Ogma (1939). Library of Congress John Adams Building
- Weapons: Club
- Battles: Magh Tuiredh

Genealogy
- Parents: Elatha and Ethniu (or Etain)
- Siblings: Dagda, Fiacha, Delbáeth, Allód, Bres
- Children: Delbáeth, Tuireann

Ogma /ˈɒɡmə/ (Modern Irish: Oghma) is a god from Irish and Scottish mythology. A member of the Tuatha Dé Danann, he is often considered a deity and may be related to the Gallic god Ogmios. According to the Ogam Tract, he is the inventor of Ogham, the script in which Irish Gaelic was first written.

== Name and Epithets ==
=== Etymology ===
The Irish spelling "Oghma" is most likely derived from the word Ogham, the name of the ancient Irish writing system. The word Ogham is derived from the Proto-Indo-European root *h₂óǵmos, meaning a path or furrow. In Ogham, his name would be written ᚑᚌᚋᚐ.

=== Epithets ===
Ogma is given three epithets in Irish Gaelic tradition: Grianainech “sun-faced” or “shining, radiant countenance” on p. 303 of the Táin Bó Cúailnge (The Cattle Raid of Cooley) and p.187 of Lebor Gabála Érenn (Book of Invasions); Trenfher “Strongman” or “Champion” in sections 59 and 162 of the Do Cath Mag Tuired (Second Battle of Moytura); and Griain-éigis “Shining sage or learned man” in section 12 of Foras Feasa ar Éirinn (History of Ireland).

Many scholars have credited The Dagda's son Cermait's epithet Milbel, or "honey-mouthed" or "eloquence" with Ogma, but this confusion seems to be an incorrect comparison by MacKillop .

== Mythology ==
He fights in the first battle of Magh Tuiredh when the Tuatha Dé Danann take Ireland from the Fir Bolg. Under the reign of Bres, when the Tuatha Dé Danann are reduced to servitude, Ogma is forced to carry firewood, but nonetheless is the only one of the Tuatha Dé who proves his athletic and martial prowess in contests before the king. When Bres is overthrown and Nuadu restored, Ogma is his champion. His position is threatened by the arrival of Lugh at the court, so Ogma challenges him by lifting a great flagstone, which normally required eighty oxen to move it, and hurling it out of Tara, but Lugh answers the challenge by hurling it back. When Nuadu hands command of the Battle of Mag Tuired to Lugh, Ogma becomes Lugh's champion and promises to repel the Fomorian king, Indech, and his bodyguard, and to defeat a third of the enemy. During the battle he finds Orna, the sword of the Fomorian king Tethra, which recounts the deeds done with it when unsheathed. During the battle Ogma and Indech fall in single combat, although there is some confusion in the texts as in Cath Maige Tuired Ogma, Lugh and the Dagda pursue the Fomorians after the battle to recover the harp of Uaitne, the Dagda's harper. Which substantiates the reason that the Dagda gives Síd Aircheltrai to Ogma in De Gabáil in tSída (Taking of the Sidhe Mound) and is also referred to be in residence in Brecc on page 303 in the Táin Bó Cúailnge.

He often appears as a triad with Lugh and the Dagda (The Dagda is his brother and Lugh is his half-brother), who are sometimes collectively known as the trí dée dána or three gods of skill, although that designation is elsewhere applied to other groups of characters. His father is Elatha and his mother is usually given as Ethliu, sometimes as Étaín. In the Ogam Tract, he is called the son of Elatha and brother of Delbaeth and Bres. Oghma's sons include Delbaeth and Tuireann.

=== Invention of Ogham ===
In the Ogam Tract Ogma is said to be a man skilled in speech and poetry who invented the Ogham as proof of his ingenuity and to create a speech that belongs to learned men apart from rustics. In the same tract Ogma is called the father of the Ogham alphabet, and his knife or hand its mother. The same tract says that sound was the father of Ogham and matter its mother.

== Related figures ==
Scholars of Celtic mythology have proposed that Ogma represents the vestiges of an ancient Celtic god. By virtue of his battle prowess and the invention of Ogham, he is compared with Ogmios, a Gaulish deity associated with eloquence and equated with Herakles. J. A. MacCulloch compares Ogma's epithet grianainech (sun-face) with Lucian's description of the "smiling face" of Ogmios, and suggests Ogma's position as champion of the Tuatha Dé Danann may derive "from the primitive custom of rousing the warriors' emotions by eloquent speeches before a battle", although this is hardly supported by the texts. Scholars such Rudolf Thurneysen and Anton van Hamel dispute any link between Ogma and Ogmios. Eufydd fab Dôn is another figure from Welsh mythology whose name is believed to derive from that of Ogmios and therefore may be related to Ogma.

== See also ==
- Eufydd fab Dôn
- Ogmios
