= Nemed =

Figure of Irish mythology

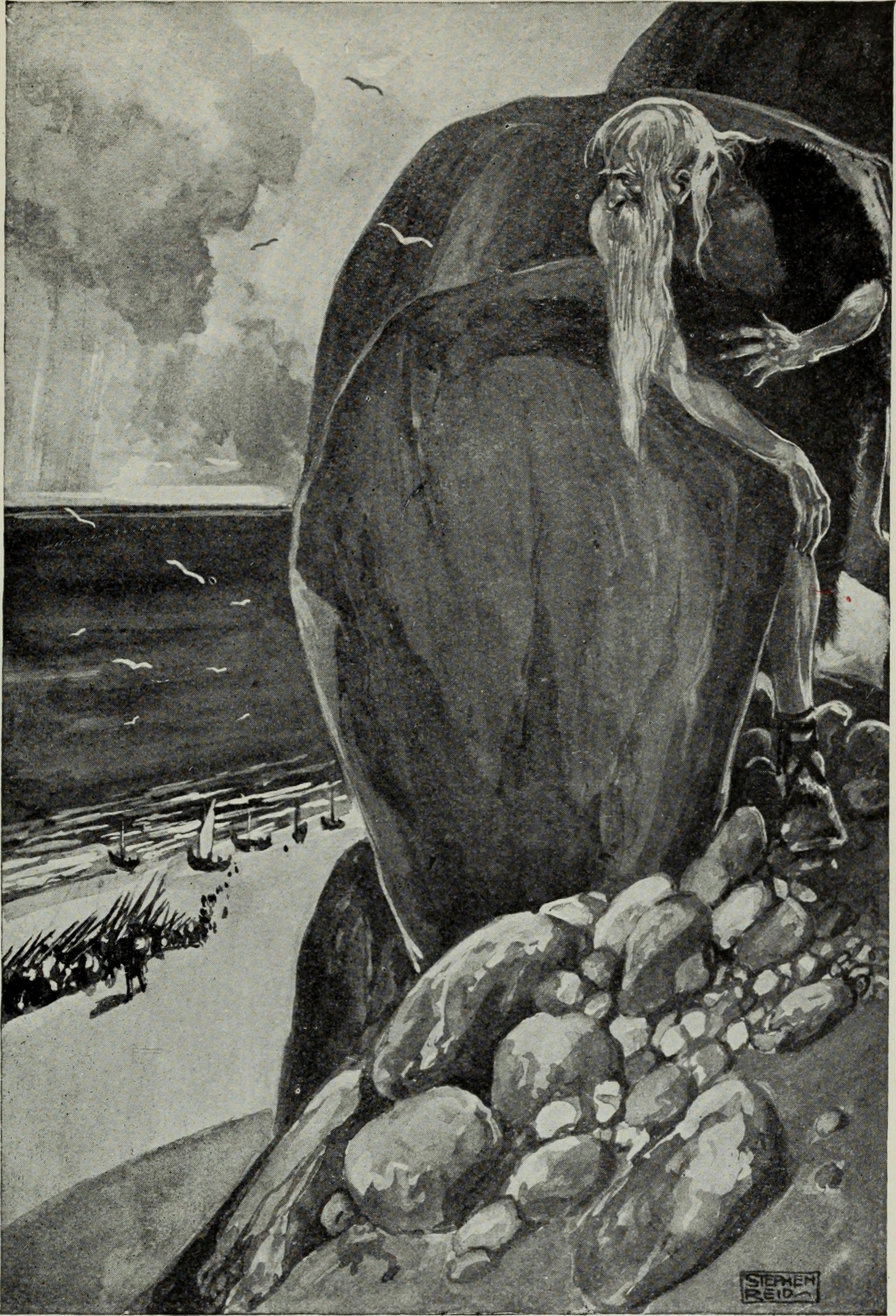
"Tuan watches Nemed", an illustration of Tuán watching the Nemedians arriving in Ireland, by Stephen Reid in T. W. Rolleston's Myths & Legends of the Celtic Race, 1911

Nemed or Nimeth (Modern Irish: Neimheadh) is a character in medieval Irish legend. According to the Lebor Gabála Érenn (compiled in the 11th century), he was the leader of the third group of people to settle in Ireland: the Muintir Nemid (or Muintir Neimhidh, "people of Nemed"), Clann Nemid (Clann Neimhidh, "offspring of Nemed") or "Nemedians". They arrived thirty years after the Muintir Partholóin, their predecessors, had died out. Nemed eventually dies of plague and his people are oppressed by the Fomorians. They rise up against the Fomorians, attacking their tower out at sea, but most are killed and the survivors leave Ireland. Their descendants become the Fir Bolg.

== Etymology ==
The word nemed means "privileged" or "holy" in Old Irish, and "seems to have been a designation of a druid". The reconstructed Proto-Celtic language root nemos means "sky" or "heaven". In the ancient Celtic religions a nemeton was a place of worship (which included temples, shrines and sacred natural places). Similar roots are found in place names across Celtic culture. For example, there was a Nemetes tribe of the central Rhine area, who had a goddess Nemetona.

== Legend ==
According to the Lebor Gabála, Nemed, like those who settled Ireland before him, had a genealogy going back to the Biblical Noah. Nemed was the son of Agnoman of the Greeks, the son of Piamp, son of Tait, son of Sera, son of Sru, son of Esru, son of Friamaint, son of Jobhath, son of Magog, son of Japheth, one of the sons of Noah.

Ireland had been uninhabited since the Muintir Partholóin died of plague. The Muintir Nemid set sail from the Caspian Sea in 44 ships, but after a year and a half of sailing, the only ship to reach Ireland is Nemed's. In one version, the fleet come upon a tower of gold in the sea. They try to take the tower, but all the ships except Nemed's are wrecked by the waves. Also on board are his wife Macha, his four chieftain sons (Starn, Iarbonel, Annind, and Fergus 'Red-Side'), their wives and others.

His wife Macha dies twelve days after they arrived and is buried at Ard Mhacha (Armagh). Two quite different dates are given for the arrival of Muintir Nemid: 2350 BCE, according to the Annals of the Four Masters; or 1731 BCE in Seathrún Céitinn's chronology.

Four lakes burst from the ground in Nemed's time, including Loch Annind, which flowed up when Annind's grave was being dug. The other three lakes are Loch Cál in Uí Nialláin, Loch Munremair in Luigne, and Loch Dairbrech in Mide.

The Muintir Nemid clear twelve plains: Mag Cera, Mag Eba, Mag Cuile Tolaid and Mag Luirg in Connacht; Mag Seired in Tethbae; Mag Tochair in Tír Eoghain; Mag Selmne in Dál nAraidi; Mag Macha in Airgíalla; Mag Muirthemne in Brega; Mag Bernsa in Leinster; Leccmag and Mag Moda in Munster.

They also build two royal forts: Ráth Chimbaith in Semne and Ráth Chindeich in Uí Nialláin. Ráth Chindeich was dug in one day by Boc, Roboc, Ruibne, and Rotan, the four sons of Matan Munremar. Nemed kills them before dawn the next morning.

Nemed wins four battles against the mysterious Fomorians (Fomoire). Modern scholars believe the Fomorians were a group of deities who represent the harmful or destructive powers of nature: personifications of chaos, darkness, death, blight, and drought. These battles are at Ros Fraechain (in which Fomorian kings Gann and Sengann are killed), at Badbgna in Connacht, at Cnamros in Leinster (in which Artur, Nemed's first son born in Ireland, dies), and at Murbolg in Dál Riata (where his son Starn is killed by the Fomorian Conand).

However, nine years after arriving in Ireland, Nemed dies of plague, along with three thousand of his people. He is buried on the hill of Ard Nemid on Great Island in Cork Harbour.

The remaining Muintir Nemid are oppressed by the Fomorians Morc and Conand, who lives in Conand's Tower, on an island off the coast. Each Samhain, the Nemedians must give two thirds of their children, their corn and their milk to the Fomorians. This tribute may be "a dim memory of sacrifice offered at the beginning of winter, when the powers of darkness and blight are in the ascendant". After many years, the Muintir Nemid rise up against the Fomorians and attack Conand's Tower with 60,000 warriors (30,000 on sea and 30,000 on land), defeating Conand. Morc then attacks, and almost all of the Nemedians are either killed in the fighting or swept away by the sea. Only one ship of thirty men escapes.

Some of the survivors go "into the north of the world" and become the Tuatha Dé Danann, some go to Britain and become the ancestors of all Britons, and some go south to Greece and become the Fir Bolg. The island would be empty for another 200 years.

The Historia Brittonum—which is earlier than the Lebor Gabála—says there were only three settlements of Ireland, with the Nemedians being the second. It says that the Nemedians came from Iberia and stayed in Ireland for many years, but returned to Iberia and the continent. The Lebor Gabála says that there were six settlements and classifies the Nemedians as the third group. The number may have been increased to six to match the "Six Ages of the World".

Irish mythology mentions another Nemed, namely Nemed mac Nama, who may or may not be the same as the Nemed mentioned in the Lebor Gabála. This Nemed is described as a famous warrior king who raised two horses with the Fairy Folk of Síd Ercmon. When the horses were released from the Síd, a stream called Uanob ("Foam River") or Oin Aub chased them from the Síd and released foam over the entire land for a year. Cúchulainn later referred to this river thus: "Over the foam of the two horses of Emain am I come".

== Analysis ==
Dáithí Ó hÓgáin writes that Nemed himself "is probably drawn from genuine tradition" and that his name (and his wife's name) suggests "he originally belonged to the context of the divine pantheon known as the Tuatha Dé Danann". He notes that the clash between the Nemedians and Fomorians echoes the primordial clash between the Tuath Dé and Fomorians, commenting that "the medieval scholars were more concerned with devising a chronological pseudo-history than with avoiding duplication".

In one version of the Lebor Gabála, the Nemedians are drowned while trying to take a golden tower at sea, while in the Historia Brittonum it is the Milesians who attack a glass tower at sea. The Nemedians later battle the Fomorians at a tower by the sea, while the Tuath Dé battle the Fomorians at a place called the "plain of towers" or "plain of pillars" (the Battle of Mag Tuired).

Preceded by Partholón	Mythical settlers of Ireland; AFM 2350 BC; FFE 1731 BC	Succeeded by Fir Bolg

== Bibliography ==
- O'Donovan (ed) (1848-1851), John. "Annals of the Kingdom of Ireland by the Four Masters". ucc.ie.
- Keating, Geoffrey. "The History of Ireland". CELT: The Corpus of Electronic Texts. University College Cork.
- MacKillop, James (1998). Dictionary of Celtic Mythology. Oxford University Press. ISBN 978-0-19-860967-4.
- Hull, Vernam (119–123). "The Invasion of Nemed".
