= Sencha mac Ailella =

Character from Irish mythology

Sencha mac Ailella is a character from the Ulster Cycle of Irish mythology. He acts as an important judge and notable poet during the reign of Conchobar mac Nessa. He volunteered to foster Cúchulainn, but was only an educator. Sencha helped establish peace between the Ulstermen.

Sencha's face broke out in "blotches" when giving a misogynistic judgment. They were a consequence of a spiritual or magical ban that compelled him to behave fairly. His face was later healed when Brigit convinced Sencha to reconsider his judgment.

He has been compared to Nestor of Homer's Iliad and Merlin of the Arthurian Legends.
