= Tethra =

Irish god

In Irish mythology, Tethra of the Fomorians ruled Mag Mell after dying in the Second Battle of Mag Tuiredh. After the battle, his sword, Orna, was taken by Ogma and it then recounted everything it had done.

== Etymology ==
Tethra may be derived from the Proto-Indo-European *tet(e)ro- meaning 'quacking sound'. Tethra means both sea and scald-crow Badb or Roynston's crow in Old Irish.

== Popular culture ==
"Tethra" is the name of an armor set for the Highlander in For Honor.

== Music ==
"Tethra" is the name of an Italian Melancholic Doom Death Metal band started in 2008, which is still active.

Ogives Big Band released a song called 'Tethra' on their EP 'HARM' in October 2019 with an accompanying music video.
