= Sreng =

Irish mythological hero

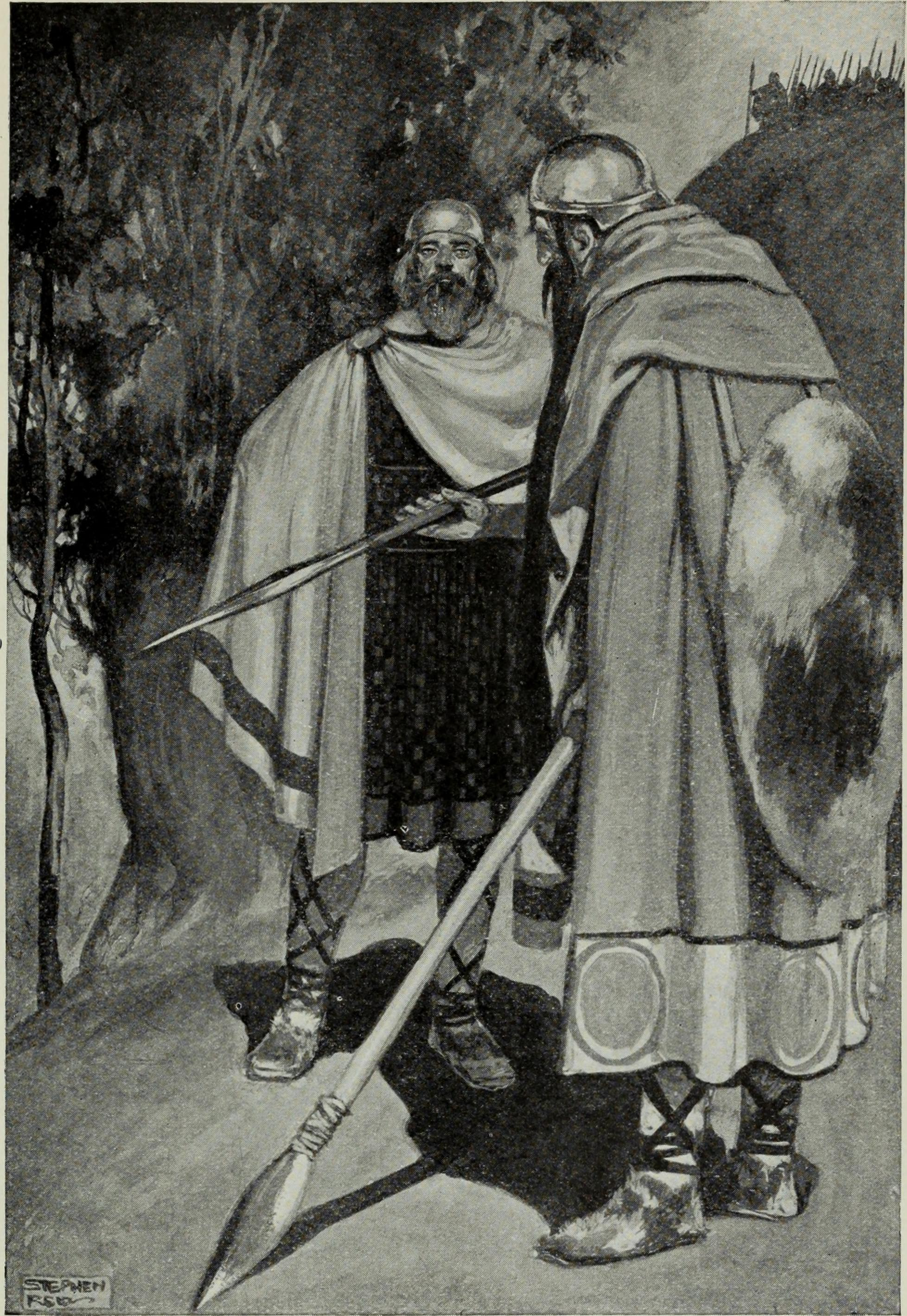

In Irish mythology Sreng (often misinterpreted as Streng) was a champion of the Fir Bolg or Men of Bolg. Armed with an iron club or mace, he faced Nuada, king of the Tuatha Dé Danann in the first Battle of Magh Tuiredh, and with one great blow he cut off half his shield and severed Nuada's arm at the shoulder.

Although nearing defeat, Sreng and the three hundred surviving Fir Bolg vowed to fight to the last man. The Tuatha Dé Danann invaders, however, considered them so noble that they offered them one fifth of Ireland. They agreed, and stood down from the conflict. The Fir Bolg chose Connacht, where men traced their descent from Sreng until the 17th century.
