= Elatha =

Irish mythological character

- Member of Fomorians
- Battles: Second Battle of Magh Tuireadh

Genealogy
- Parents: Delbaeth
- Consorts: Eri, Ethniu, Etain
- Children: the Dagda, Fiacha, Delbáeth, Ogma, Allód, Bres

In Irish mythology, Elatha, Elotha, Elier or Elada (modern spelling: Ealadha) was a king of the Fomorians and the father of Bres by Ériu of the Tuatha Dé Danann, as well as Delbaeth, Ogma, Elloth (another name for Lir the father of Manannán mac Lir), and the Dagda by an unnamed mother. The imagery surrounding him suggests he may be associated with sources of light and illumination, such as the sun.

== Overview ==
Elatha is described as being the "beautiful Miltonic prince of darkness with golden hair". He was the son of Delbaeth and a king of the Fomor, and he was the father of Bres by Eriu, a woman of the Tuatha Dé Danann. He came to her over the sea in a vessel of silver, himself having the appearance of a young man with yellow hair, wearing clothes of gold and five gold torcs. He was one of the Fomor who took part in the Second Battle of Magh Tuireadh.

During the Second Battle of Magh Tuireadh, Elatha watched over his son the Dagda's magic harp, Uaithne, sometimes called Dur-da-Bla, "the Oak of Two Blossoms," and sometimes Coir-cethar-chuin, "the Four-Angled Music." He is said to have a sense of humor and a sense of nobility.

Though considered to be the Fomorian father of Eochu Bres, Elatha (Elada) was also the father of the Dagda, Ogma, a son named Delbaeth, and Elloth, elsewhere known as Lir (the father of Manannan mac Lir) according to the Lebor Gabála Érenn. The mother of these Tuatha Dé Danann chiefs may have been Ethne, the mother of Lug, based on Ogma' often cited matronymic "mac Ethliu." Since Ethne was Fomorian, this means they are all Fomorians. This is rather confusing, but may portray the battle between the two groups as actually being about the new generation of gods displacing the older generation.

== Elatha and Bres ==
She told him that his father was Elatha, one of the Kings of the Fomorians; that he had come to her one time over a level sea in a great vessel that seemed to be of silver; that he himself had the appearance of a young man with yellow hair, his clothes decked with gold and five rings of gold around his neck. She had refused the love of all the young men of her own people, had given him her love and cried when he had left her.

Before he left he had given her a ring from his own hand and had bade her give it only to the man whose finger it would fit. Eri brought out the ring and put it on the finger of Bres and it fit him well. She and Bres and some of their followers then set out of the land of the Fomorians. At long last they came to that faraway land. Elatha the local King saw the ring on Bres’ hand and asked him the whole story and said that Bres was his own son. Elatha then asked Bres what it was that drove him out of his own country and his own kingship. Bres answered truthfully: “Nothing drove me out but my own injustice and my own hardness; I took away their treasures from the people and their jewels and their food itself. And there were never taxes put on them before I was their King. And still I am come to look for fighting men that I may take Ireland by force”. Elatha listened but refused his aid, urging Bres to earn the kingship by justice. However, he also bade him go to the chief King of the Fomorians, Balar of the Evil Eye.

== Names ==
These are the names that Elatha has gone by and where that name stems from.

- Elatha - T. W. Rolleston: Myths and Legends of Celtic Race
- Elathan - Charles Squire: Mythology of the Celtic People
- Elathan - Lady Gregory: Gods and Fighting Men

Elathan is used incorrectly by Squire and Lady Gregory, as Elathan is the genitive case of Elatha and means 'of Elatha'.

According to Lady Gregory the etymology of Elatha is "art" or "knowledge" in the bardic sense. The name Elathan could also mean "(he) of the art" the n is justified in this case. This could explain why Ogma (inventor of the ogham script) is son of Elatha(n) (bardic knowledge). Elatha is called "glory of weapons" and "a wolf of division against men of plunder" in the Lebor Gabála Érenn.
