= Conand (mythology) =

Fomorian leader

In Irish mythology, Conand (a.k.a. Conann and Conaing), was a leader of the Fomorians who lived in a tower on Tory Island. He oppressed the followers of Nemed, demanding a huge tribute of their produce and children. Eventually Nemed's people rose up and killed him, destroying his tower. After his death, Morc, another Fomorian massacred Nemed's surviving followers.

== Conand's Tower ==
According to the Lebor Gabála Érenn Conand mac Febair (son of Febar) and Morc mac Deled (son of Dela) imposed a heavy tax on the clan of Nemed, demanding two-thirds of their wheat, milk, and offspring, which were due every Samain at the plain called Mag Cetne. The oppressed attacked from the sea with a host of 30,000 headed by three champions, grandsons and great-grandsons of Nemed, and overcame Conand and his host of 30,000 at Conand's Tower (later called Torinis Cetne). Morc subsequently arrived with a fleet of sixty ships to retake the tower from the people of Nemed, and mutual annihilation ensued, forcing the Nemedian folk into diaspora out of Ireland.

The tale was embellished by Mícheál Ó Cléirigh in the Annals of the Four Masters recension of the Lebor Gabála, whereby the Nemedian folk obtain assistance from Greece in the form of venomous beasts, and a woman spy named Relbeo. She infiltrates the tower and gains Conand's trust, obtaining crucial intelligence on how to tactically assault the tower. R. A. S. Macalister states Ó Cléirigh invented this seemingly out of thin air, and it would be a futile exercise to second guess what source he may have plagiarized.

=== Localization ===
It had almost become conventional wisdom to identify the location of this Conand's tower at Tory Island, ever since the publication of O'Flaherty's Ogygia, but this has been disputed by Henry Morris (Énrí Ó Muirgheasa). Morris argued that the plain where the taxes were collected (Mag Cetne) was properly to be located in County Sligo, south of the Duff River, and not in County Donegal between the Drowes River (Drobhais) and Erne River as Geoffrey Keating indicated. Morris consequently proposed a small island off the coast, called Derinish, corrupted from Tor-Inis. Macalister commends the effort, while noting that such a treatise can hardly hope to carry conclusive proof.
