= Tuatha Dé Danann =

Pantheon of pre-Christian Ireland

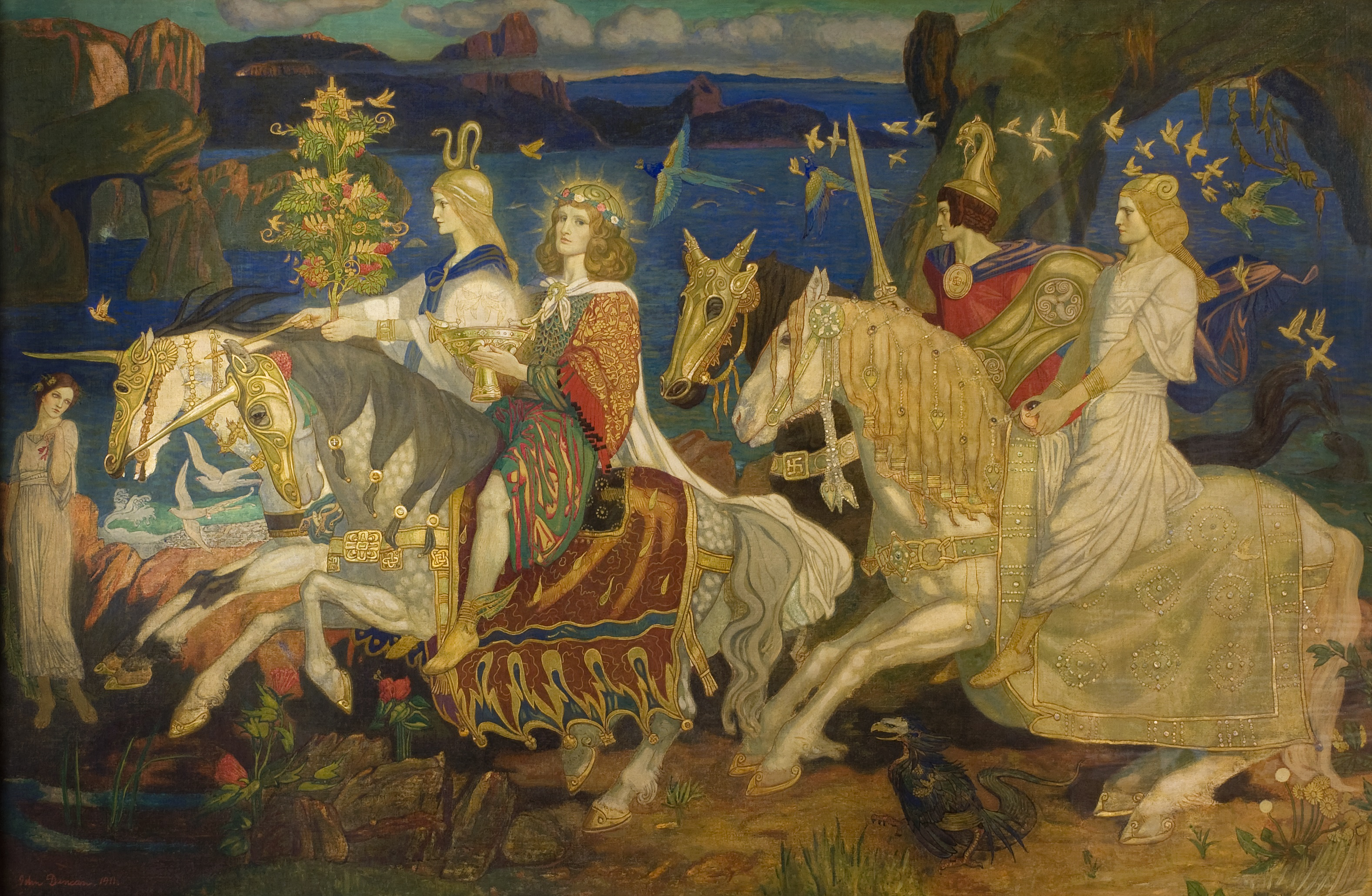
The Tuatha Dé Danann as depicted in John Duncan's Riders of the Sidhe (1911)

The Tuatha Dé Danann (Irish: [ˈt̪ˠuə(hə) dʲeː ˈd̪ˠan̪ˠən̪ˠ], usually translated "folk of the goddess Danu"), also known by the earlier name Tuath Dé ("tribe of the gods" or "divine tribe"), are a supernatural race in Irish mythology. Many of them are thought to represent deities of pre-Christian Gaelic Ireland.

The Tuath Dé Danann are often depicted as kings, queens, druids, bards, warriors, heroes, healers and craftsmen who have supernatural powers. They dwell in the Otherworld but interact with humans and the human world. They are associated with the sídhe: prominent ancient burial mounds such as Brú na Bóinne, which are entrances to Otherworld realms. Their traditional rivals are the Fomorians (Fomóire), who might represent the destructive powers of nature, and whom the Tuatha Dé Danann defeat in the Battle of Mag Tuired. Prominent members include the Dagda ("the great god"); The Morrígan ("the great queen" or "phantom queen"); Lugh; Nuada; Aengus; Brigid; Manannán; Dian Cecht the healer; and Goibniu the smith, one of the Trí Dé Dána ("three gods of craft").

Several of the Tuath Dé are cognate with ancient Celtic deities: Lugh with Lugus, Brigit with Brigantia, Nuada with Nodons, Ogma with Ogmios, and Goibniu with Gobannus.

Medieval texts about the Tuatha Dé Danann were written by Christians. Sometimes they explained the Tuath Dé as fallen angels who were neither wholly good nor evil, or ancient people who became highly skilled in magic, but several writers acknowledged that at least some of them had been gods. Some of them have multiple names, but in the tales, they often appear to be different characters. Originally, these probably represented different aspects of the same deity, while others were regional names.

The Tuath Dé eventually became the aes sídhe, the sídhe-folk or "fairies" of later folklore.

== Name ==
The Old Irish word túath (plural túatha) means "tribe, folk, people"; dé is the genitive case of día and, depending on context, can mean "god, gods, goddess" or more broadly "deity, divinity, supernatural being, object of worship". In the earliest writings, the mythical race are referred to simply as the Túath Dé, "tribe of gods/divine tribe", or Túatha Dé, "tribes of gods/divine tribes". In the Lebor Bretnach their name is translated into Latin as plebes deorum, "god-folk".

Irish monks also began using the term Túath Dé to refer to the Israelites, with the meaning "People of God". Apparently to avoid confusion with the Israelites, writers began to refer to the mythical race as the Túath(a) Dé Danann or Túath(a) Dé Donann (Old Irish pronunciation: [ˈt̪uːa̯θa d̠ʲeː ˈd̪anan̪]). This is generally translated as "folk of the goddess Danu". It may also have been a way of humanising them: instead of 'god-folk', they were now the folk of a particular goddess.

Danann is generally believed to be the genitive of a female name, for which the nominative case is not attested. It has been reconstructed as *Danu, of which Anu (genitive Anann) may be an alternative form. Anu is called "mother of the Irish gods" in Cormac's Glossary. This may be linked to the Welsh mythical figure Dôn. Hindu mythology also has a goddess called Danu, who may be an Indo-European parallel. However, this reconstruction is not universally accepted.

It has also been suggested that Danann is a conflation of dán ("skill, craft") and the goddess name Anann. This hypothesis interprets the name as "Tuatha Dé Dána" or "Tribe of the Gods of Craft", i.e., the divine counterparts of áes dána "men of craft". (Note: áes dána refers mundanely to human "men of art", but the point is made that the meaning of dána ('art') here is widely encompassing and includes the professions of doctors, bards, poets, and druids.) There is a mysterious group called trí dé dáno, "three gods of craft". (Note: The mysterious Trí Dé Dána ("Three Gods of Skill"), it has been speculated, may refer to the three gods, Goibniu, Creidhne, and Luchta.)

The name is also found as Donann and Domnann, which may point to the origin being proto-Celtic *don, meaning "earth" (compare the Old Irish word for earth, doman). Tírechán described the sídh folk as dei terreni, "earthly gods". The name could be cognate with the mythical Fir Domnann and the British Dumnonii.

Early Christian writers also referred to them as the fir dé (god-men) and cenéla dé (god-kindreds), again possibly to avoid calling them simply 'gods'. They are also the "ever-living ones", but not immortal in the sense of being immune to violent death.

According to Carey, the Tuath Dé are collectively called the clann Eladan, "children of art" in a poem in the Lebor Gabála. However, Macalister translates this cland Elada phrase merely as "the numerous progeny of Elada", which is followed by the naming of Bres son of Elada son of Delabaeth son of Neit. (Note: Note that the item is deleted in Carey (2012) s.v. "Tuath Dé".)

In the modern era, the Tuatha Dé Danann came to be referred, in circumlocutive fashion, as the áes sídhe ('people of the sidhe or Otherworld').

== Description ==
The Tuatha Dé Danann are described as a supernatural race, much like idealised humans, who are immune to ageing and sickness, and who have powers of magic. The powers most often attributed to them are control over the weather and the elements, and the ability to shapeshift themselves and other things. They are also said to control the fertility of the land; the tale De Gabáil in t-Sída says the first Gaels had to establish friendship with the Tuatha Dé Danann before they could raise crops and herds. They are also depicted as masters of the arts (bards, warriors, heroes, healers and craftsmen). (Note: The Tuatha Dé "excelled over all people on earth in their proficiency in every art".) And "their ranks only admit those who possess dán (poetic, artistic, or craftsmanly skill). Famously the condition imposed for admittance to their fort was mastery in some art or skill, and Lugh passed with flying colors by being master of all (samildanach).

They live in the Otherworld, which is described as either a parallel world or a heavenly land beyond the sea or under the earth's surface. Many of them are associated with specific places in the landscape, especially the sídh mounds; the ancient burial mounds and passage tombs which are entrances to Otherworld realms. Thus the Tuath Dé are often implied when one speaks of the áes sídhe ('people of the sidhe or Otherworld'). The Tuath Dé can hide themselves with a féth fíada ('magic mist') and appear to humans only when they wish to.

In some tales, such as Baile in Scáil, a king receives affirmation of his legitimacy from one of the Tuath Dé. In other tales, a king's right to rule is affirmed by an encounter with an otherworldly woman. It has been argued that the inauguration of Irish kings originally represented their ritual marriage to the goddess of the land (see sovereignty goddess). The Tuath Dé can also bring doom to unrightful kings.

The medieval writers who wrote about the Tuatha Dé Danann were Christians. Sometimes they explained the Tuath Dé as fallen angels; neutral angels who sided neither with God nor Lucifer and were punished by being forced to dwell on the Earth; or humans who had become highly skilled in magic. However, several writers acknowledged that at least some of them had been gods.

There is strong evidence that many of the Tuatha Dé Danann represent the gods of Irish paganism. The name itself means "tribe of gods", and the ninth-century Scél Tuain meic Cairill (Tale of Tuan mac Cairill) speaks of the Tuath Dé ocus Andé, "tribe of gods and un-gods". Goibniu, Credne and Luchta are called the trí dé dáno, "three gods of craft". In Sanas Cormaic (Cormac's Glossary), Anu is called "mother of the Irish gods", Nét a "god of war", and Brigit a "goddess of poets" whose father is the Dagda; his own name meaning "the great god". Writing in the seventh century, Tírechán explained the sídh folk as "earthly gods" (Latin dei terreni), while Fiacc's Hymn says the Irish adored the sídh before the coming of Saint Patrick. Goibniu, Dian Cécht the physician, and Flidais the mistress of animals are invoked in incantations, further evidence that they were seen as supernatural powers. Several of the Tuath Dé are cognate with ancient Celtic deities: Lugh with Lugus, Brigit with Brigantia, Nuada with Nodons, and Ogma with Ogmios.

Nevertheless, John Carey notes that it is not wholly accurate to describe all of them as gods in the medieval literature itself. He argues that the literary Tuath Dé are sui generis, and suggests "immortals" might be a more neutral term; though (as aforementioned) they can be killed in battle, as was the case with the Norse gods.

== Legend ==
In euhemerized accounts, the Tuatha Dé Danann were descended from Nemed, leader of a previous wave of inhabitants of Ireland. In non-euhemerized accounts, they are descended from Danu/Anu, a mother goddess. They came from four cities to the north of Ireland—Falias, Gorias, Murias and Finias—where they taught their skills in the sciences, including architecture, the arts and magic. According to Lebor Gabála Érenn, they came to Ireland "in dark clouds" and "landed on the mountains of [the] Conmaicne Rein in Connachta", otherwise Sliabh an Iarainn, "and they brought a darkness over the sun for three days and three nights". They immediately burnt the ships "so that they should not think of retreating to them, and the smoke and the mist that came from the vessels filled the neighbouring land and air. Therefore it was conceived that they had arrived in clouds of mist".

A poem in the Lebor Gabála Érenn says of their arrival:

It is God who suffered them, though He restrained them
they landed with horror, with lofty deed,
in their cloud of mighty combat of spectres,
upon a mountain of Conmaicne of Connacht.

Without distinction to discerning Ireland,
Without ships, a ruthless course
the truth was not known beneath the sky of stars,
whether they were of heaven or of earth.

According to Tuan:

From them are the Tuatha Dé and Andé, whose origin the learned do not know, but that it seems likely to them that they came from heaven, on account of their intelligence and for the excellence of their knowledge.

Led by king Nuada, they fought the First Battle of Magh Tuireadh on the west coast, in which they defeated and displaced the native Fir Bolg, who then inhabited Ireland. In the battle, Nuada lost an arm to their champion, Sreng. Since Nuada was no longer "unblemished", he could not continue as king and was replaced by the half-Fomorian Bres, who turned out to be a tyrant. The physician Dian Cecht replaced Nuada's arm with a working silver one and he was reinstated as king. However, Dian Cecht's son Miach was dissatisfied with the replacement, so he recited the spell, "ault fri halt dí & féith fri féth" (joint to joint of it and sinew to sinew), which caused flesh to grow over the silver prosthesis over the course of nine days and nights. However, in a fit of jealous rage Dian Cecht slew his own son. Because of Nuada's restoration as the leader, Bres complained to his family and his father, Elatha, who sent him to seek assistance from Balor, king of the Fomorians.

The Tuath Dé then fought the Second Battle of Magh Tuireadh against the Fomorians. Nuada was killed by the Fomorian king Balor's poisonous eye, but Balor was killed by Lugh, champion of the Tuath Dé, who then took over as king.

A third battle was fought against a subsequent wave of invaders, the Milesians, from the northwest of the Iberian Peninsula (present-day Galicia and Northern Portugal), descendants of Míl Espáine (who are thought to represent the Goidelic Celts). The Milesians encountered three Tuath Dé goddesses, Ériu, Banba, and Fodla, who asked that the island be named after them; Ériu is the origin of the modern name Éire, and Banba and Fodla are still sometimes used as poetic names for Ireland.

Their three husbands, Mac Cuill, Mac Cecht and Mac Gréine, were kings of the Tuath Dé at that time, and asked for a truce of three days, during which the Milesians would lie at anchor nine waves' distance from the shore. The Milesians complied, but the Tuath Dé created a magical storm in an attempt to drive them away. The Milesian poet Amergin calmed the sea with his verse, then his people landed and defeated the Tuath Dé at Tailtiu. When Amergin was called upon to divide the land between the Tuath Dé and his own people, he cleverly allotted the portion above ground to the Milesians and the portion underground to the Tuath Dé. The Tuath Dé were led underground into the Sidhe mounds by Manannán mac Lir and Tír na nÓg onto a flowery plain/plain of honey attested to in the Voyage of Bran.

=== The Four Treasures ===
The Tuatha Dé Danann brought four magical treasures with them to Ireland, one apiece from their Four Cities:

- Dagda's Cauldron
- The Spear of Lugh
- Lia Fáil (The Stone of Fal)
- Claíomh Solais (The Sword of Light)

=== Tuatha Dé Danann High Kings of Ireland ===
The following is a chronology from the Annals of the Four Masters, based on reign-lengths given in Geoffrey Keating's Forus Feasa ar Erinn. Nuada's original reign lacks a precise start date.

- Nuada (first reign) AFM unknown–1897 BC; FFE unknown–1477 BC
- Bres AFM 1897–1890 BC; FFE 1477–1470 BC
- Nuada (final reign) AFM 1890–1870 BC; FFE 1470–1447 BC
- Lugh AFM 1870–1830 BC; FFE 1447–1407 BC
- Eochaid Ollathair AFM 1830–1750 BC; FFE 1407–1337 BC
- Delbáeth AFM 1750–1740 BC; FFE 1337–1327 BC
- Fiacha AFM 1740–1730 BC; FFE 1327–1317 BC
- Mac Cuill, Mac Cecht and Mac Gréine AFM 1730–1700 BC; FFE 1317–1287 BC

== Additional members ==
In the Irish version of the Historia Britonum of Nennius, the chief men of science of the Tuatha Dé Danann are listed with their partly Latin names and associations as follows:

- Luchtenus, artifex ("artisan")
- Credenus, figulus ("shaper/builder")
- Dianus, medicus ("doctor")
- Eadon, daughter of Dianus and nurse of the poets—presumably Étaín, Brigid, or Airmed
- Goibnen, faber ("smith/architect")
- Lug, son of Eithne, with whom were all the arts
- Dagda the Great, the King
- Ogma, brother of the King, from whom came the letters of the Scots

In the Annals of Inisfallen, the following are listed as members of the Tuatha Dé who overcame the Fir Bolg:

- Bres, son of Elatha
- Delbaeth, son of Elatha
- Dagda
- Mac ind Óc
- Lug son of Ethliu
- Dian Cécht
- Goibnenn the smith
- Luchtaine the wright
- Crédne the craftsman

== See also ==
- Æsir
- Anunnaki
- Aos Sí
- Sliabh an Iarainn
- Twelve Olympians

== Explanatory notes ==
Preceded by Fir Bolg	Mythical invasions of Ireland; AFM 1897 BC; FFE 1477 BC	Succeeded by Milesians
