= Rigisamus =

Gaulish and Celtic deity

- Royal power, possibly war (via Mars)
- Other names: Rigisamos
- Major cult center: Bourges (France), West Cocker (England)
- Region: Gaul, Britain

Rigisamus, also Rigisamos, was a deity in Gaulish and Celtic mythology who, according to the Interpretatio Romana, was connected with Mars.

== Mythology and Etymology ==
Rigisamus is mentioned in two inscriptions, one in Bourges (Cher department, Region Center-Val de Loire in France), and the other in West Cocker (in Yeovil, county of Somerset in England) together with a picture of God and the following text:

Deo Marti | Rigisamo | Iu (v) entius | Sabinus | v (otum) s (olvit) l (aetus) l (ibens) m (erito)
("Juventius Sabinus gladly and deservedly fulfilled the vow for the god Mars Rigisamus")

The name Rigisamus is derived from a reconstructed Proto-Indo-European root * rīg ("king", "royal") and a second, * -samo, * samali ("unique"). Rigisamus would therefore mean "the most royal", or "king of kings". The Irish word rí [ R'iː ] and the Gallic rix [rīg-s ] (both also mean “king”) are directly related to this.

It is unknown which properties of Mars are attributed to Rigisamus.

== See also ==
- List of Celtic deities
- Ancient Celtic religion
- Gaulish gods
