= Bres =

Mythical king in Irish mythology

In Irish mythology, Bres (or Bress) was a king of the Tuatha Dé Danann. He is often referred to by the name Eochaid / Eochu Bres. He was an unpopular king, and favoured his Fomorian kin.

== Name ==
Eochu Bres has been translated as "beautiful horseman." The scribes who wrote down the text of the Cath Maige Tuired record Bres as meaning 'beautiful', however, this may be a false etymology. The original meaning of Bres may have derived from a root meaning "fight," "blow," "effort," "uproar," or "din."

== Description ==
In the Lebor Gabála and Cath Maige Tuired, Bres is portrayed as beautiful to behold, yet harsh and inhospitable. However, the poem Carn Hui Neit from the dindsenchas praises Bres' "kindly" and "noble" character and calls him the "flower" of the Tuatha Dé Danann. There, the following flattering descriptions are provided for Bres:

- gifted with excellences
- master of love-spells
- kindly friend
- noble and fortunate
- ornament of the host
- with a visage never woeful
- flower of the Tuatha De
- hot of valour
- spear-attended king

== Family ==
In Cath Maige Tuired Bres' parents were Prince Elatha of the Fomorians and Ériu of the Tuatha Dé Danann. Alternately in The Fate of the Children of Turenn, Bres' father is Balor of the Evil Eye. He grew so quickly that by the age of seven he was the size of a 14-year-old. His wife was Brigid, daughter of the Dagda, and his son was Ruadan, who was killed by Goibniu.

== Irish Mythology ==
In the First Battle of Magh Tuiredh, King Nuada of the Tuatha Dé Danann lost his hand; because he was imperfect, he could not be king. Hoping to reconcile relations between the Fomorians and the Tuatha Dé Danann, Bres was named king and Brigid of the Tuatha de Danann married him, giving him a son, Ruadan, who would later be killed trying to assassinate Goibniu.

Bres made the Tuatha Dé Danann pay tribute to the Fomorians and work as slaves: Ogma was forced to carry firewood, and the Dagda had to dig trenches around forts. He neglected his duties of hospitality: the Tuatha Dé complained that after visiting his house their knives were never greased and their breaths did not smell of ale. Cairbre, poet of the Tuatha Dé, composed a scathing poem against him, which was the first satire in Ireland, and everything went wrong for Bres after that.

After Bres had ruled for seven years, Nuada had his hand, which had formerly been replaced with a silver one by Dian Cecht and Creidhne, replaced with one of flesh and blood by Dian Cecht's son Miach, with the help of his sister Airmed; following the successful replacement, Nuada was restored to kingship and Bres was exiled. He went to his father for help to recover his throne, but Elatha would not help him gain by foul means what he had been unable to keep: "You have no right to get it by injustice when you could not keep it by justice". Bres was guided by his father to Balor, another leader of the Fomorians, for the help he sought.

He led the Fomorians in the Second Battle of Magh Tuireadh but lost. He was found unprotected on the battlefield by Lugh and pleaded for his life. Lugh spared him because he promised to teach the Tuatha Dé agriculture.

In a contradictory account from the dindsenchas Bres' death is described at the hands of Lugh. Lugh made 300 wooden cows, and filled them with a bitter, poisonous red liquid which was then "milked" into pails and offered to Bres to drink. Bres, who was under an obligation not to refuse hospitality, drank it down without flinching, and it killed him. The Lebor Gabála mentions this incident briefly, however the deadly liquid is identified as sewage.

Royal titles
Preceded by Eochaid mac Eirc	High King of Ireland; AFM 1897–1890 BC; FFE 1477–1470 BC	Succeeded by Nuada
