= Delbáeth =

Mythological Irish king

Delbáeth or Delbáed (Modern Irish: Dealbhaoth or Dealbhaodh) was one of several figures from Irish mythology who are often confused due to the repetition of the name in the mythological genealogies.

== Name ==
According to the Dindsenchas, the name Delbaeth is derived from Dolb-Aed, meaning "enchanted fire" or "fire shape(d)."

== Family ==
His father is variously listed as Aengus or Ogma of the Tuatha Dé Danann or Elatha of the Fomorians, and his mother was Ethniu of the Fomorians. He succeeded his grandfather Eochaid Ollathair ("the Dagda") as High King of Ireland. Delbáeth ruled the united Tuatha Dé Danann and Fomorians for ten years, before dying at the hand of his son, Fiacha.

== Children ==
In some traditions the goddess Eithne is mentioned as his daughter.

Portions of Lebor Gabála Érenn identify Delbáeth as the father of Brian, Iuchar, and Iucharba, and also mention that Delbáeth was also called "Tuirill Biccreo".

The Delbhna (an ancient Irish tribe) claimed to be his descendants.

== Alternative and shared names ==
Delbáeth seems to be the same character as the thunder god Tuireann, because he was identified as "Tuirill Biccreo", the father of Brian, Iuchar, and Iucharba, mentioned above.

Delbáeth is also given as a name of "Lugaid mac Tail" after Lugaid lights an enchanted fire from which burst five streams.

A different Delbáeth – Delbáeth Mac Neit – is identified in the same section of Lebor Gabála Érenn as Tuirill Biccreo's great-grandfather.

Preceded by Eochaid Ollathair	High King of Ireland; AFM 1750–1740 BC; FFE 1337–1327 BC	Succeeded by Fiacha
