= The Dagda =

God in Irish mythology

- Chief/leader of the Gods.
- Member of the Tuatha Dé Danann
- Abode: Brú na Bóinne
- Weapons: Club; Mace
- Battles: Magh Tuiredh
- Artefacts: Staff; Cauldron; Harp

Genealogy
- Parents: Elatha (father)
- Siblings: Ogma
- Consorts: Morrigan; Boand
- Children: Aed; Aengus; Bodb Derg; Cermait; Midir; Brigit

The Dagda (Old Irish: In Dagda [ˈd̪aɣða], Irish: An Daghdha) is considered the great god of Irish mythology. He is the chief god of the Tuatha Dé Danann, with the Dagda portrayed as a father-figure, king, and druid. He is associated with fertility, agriculture, masculinity and strength, as well as magic, druidry and wisdom. He can control life and death (cf. his staff), the weather and crops, as well as time and the seasons.

He is often described as a large bearded man or giant wearing a hooded cloak. He owns a magic staff (lorc) of dual nature: it kills with one end and brings to life with the other. He also owns a cauldron (the coire ansic) which never runs empty, and a magic harp (Uaithne, though this may be the name of the harper), which will not play unless called by its two bynames, and the harp can fly itself to the Dagda when thus beckoned. He is said to dwell in Brú na Bóinne (Newgrange). Other places associated with or named after him include Uisneach, Grianan of Aileach, Lough Neagh, Lough Derg, and Knock Iveagh. The Dagda is said to be the husband of the Morrígan and lover of Boann. His children include Aengus, Brigit, Bodb Derg, Cermait, Aed, and Midir.

The Dagda's name is thought to mean "the good god" or "the great god". His other names include Eochu or Eochaid Ollathair ("horseman, great father"), and Ruad Rofhessa ("mighty one/lord of great knowledge"). There are indications Dáire was another name for him. The death and ancestral god Donn may originally have been a form of the Dagda, and he also has similarities with the later harvest figure Crom Dubh. Several tribal groupings saw the Dagda as an ancestor and were named after him, such as the Uí Echach and the Dáirine.

The Dagda has been likened to the Germanic god Odin, the Gaulish god Sucellos, and the Roman god Dīs Pater or Jupiter.

== Name ==
=== Etymology ===
The Old Irish name Dagda is generally believed to stem from Proto-Celtic: *Dago-dēwos, meaning "the good god" or "the great god".

=== Epithets ===
The Dagda has several other names or epithets which reflect aspects of his character.

- Eochu or Eochaid Ollathair ("horseman, great father" or "horseman, all-father")
- Ruad Rofhessa ("mighty one/lord of great knowledge")
- Dáire ("the fertile one")
- Aed ("the fiery one")
- Fer Benn ("horned man" or "man of the peak")
- Cera (possibly "creator"),
- Cerrce (possibly "striker")
- Easal
- Eogabal

The name Eochu is a diminutive form of Eochaid, which also has spelling variants of Eochaidh and Echuid. The death and ancestral god Donn may originally have been a form of the Dagda, who is sometimes called Dagda Donn.

== Description ==
The Dagda was one of the kings of the Tuatha De Danann. The Tuatha Dé Danann are the race of supernatural beings who conquered the Fomorians, who inhabited Ireland previously, prior to the coming of the Milesians. The Mórrígan is described as his wife, his daughter was Brigit, and his lover was Boann, after whom the River Boyne is named, though she was married to Elcmar and with whom he had the god Aengus. Prior to the battle with the Fomorians, he coupled with the goddess of war, the Mórrígan, on Samhain. (Cf. § Family).

The Middle Irish text Cóir Anmann (The Fitness of Names) states:

"[Dagda] was a beautiful god of the heathens, for the Tuatha Dé Danann worshipped him: for he was an earth-god to them because of the greatness of his magical power".

Tales depict the Dagda as a figure of immense power. He is said to own a magic staff, club or mace which could kill nine men with one blow; but with the handle he could return the slain to life. He owned a magic harp.

=== Dagda's staff ===
In the tract found in the Yellow Book of Lecan, there were three items the Dagda named together, his staff (lorc), there was the shirt (léine) of protection from sickness, and the cloak (lumman) of shape-shifting and colour-change. (Note: Old Irish spellings normalised from redaction which reads "Lene ⁊ lorc ⁊ lumann".) The "great staff" (lorg mór) had a smooth end which brought the dead back to life (he resuscitated his son Cermait Milbél with the smooth end), but the staff's rough end caused instant death.

The staff/club is also described in the Ulster Cycle narrative, Mesca Ulad, where it was called the "terrible iron staff" (lorg aduathmar iarnaidi).

=== Cauldron ===
The Cauldron of the Dagda is one of the Four Treasures of the Tuatha Dé Danann, of which it was said "an assembly used not to go unsatisfied from it". (Note: Ó hÓgáin 1999, p. 62, citing Hull ed. tr. "Four Jewels", but his quote is Ó hÓgáin's own translation, as it differs in wording from Hull's "Never went an assembly of guests away unsatisfied from the caldron of the Dagda".)

The cauldron "signified plenty and generousity". Hence, his magic cauldron was otherwise known as the coire ansic ("the un-dry cauldron").

=== Dagda's harp ===
After Úaithne, the Dagda's harper was abducted by the Fomorians, the Dagda went to the enemy's hall and retrieved his magic harp, which had two names, according to the text of the Cath Maige Tuired ("Second Battle of Moytura"). And when the Dagda called upon his harp by its two names: "Come Daur Dá Bláo / Come Cóir Cetharchair / Come summer, come winter..." the harp leapt off the wall and came to him. Some have interpreted this to mean the harp controls the seasons, though source texts do not say so explicitly. The harp was forbidden by the Dagda from issuing any sound, unless thus called upon by the names, which translate to "Oak of Two Meadows" and "the Four Angled Music"; The Dagda had the skill to play the "Three Strains" (joy, sorrow, sleep) which he used to immobilise the Fomorians and escape.

=== Other possessions ===
He possessed two pigs, one of which was always growing whilst the other was always roasting, and ever-laden fruit trees. He is also described as being the owner of a black-maned heifer that was given to him for his labours prior to the Second Battle of Moytura. When the heifer calls her calf, all the cattle of Ireland taken by the Fomorians as tribute graze.

== Family ==
The Dagda is said to be husband of the Morrígan, who is called his "envious wife". His children include Aengus, Cermait, and Aed (often called the three sons of the Dagda), Brigit and Bodb Derg. He is said to have two brothers, Nuada and Ogma, but this may be an instance of the tendency to triplicate deities. Elsewhere the Dagda is linked exclusively with Ogma, and the two are called "the two brothers." In the Dindsenchas, the Dagda is given a daughter named Ainge, for whom he makes a twig basket or tub that always leaks when the tide is in and never leaks when it is going out. The Dagda's father is named Elatha son of Delbeath. Englec, the daughter of Elcmar, is named as a consort of the Dagda and the mother of his "swift son". Echtgi the loathesome is another daughter of the Dagda's named in the Banshenchas.

== Mythology ==
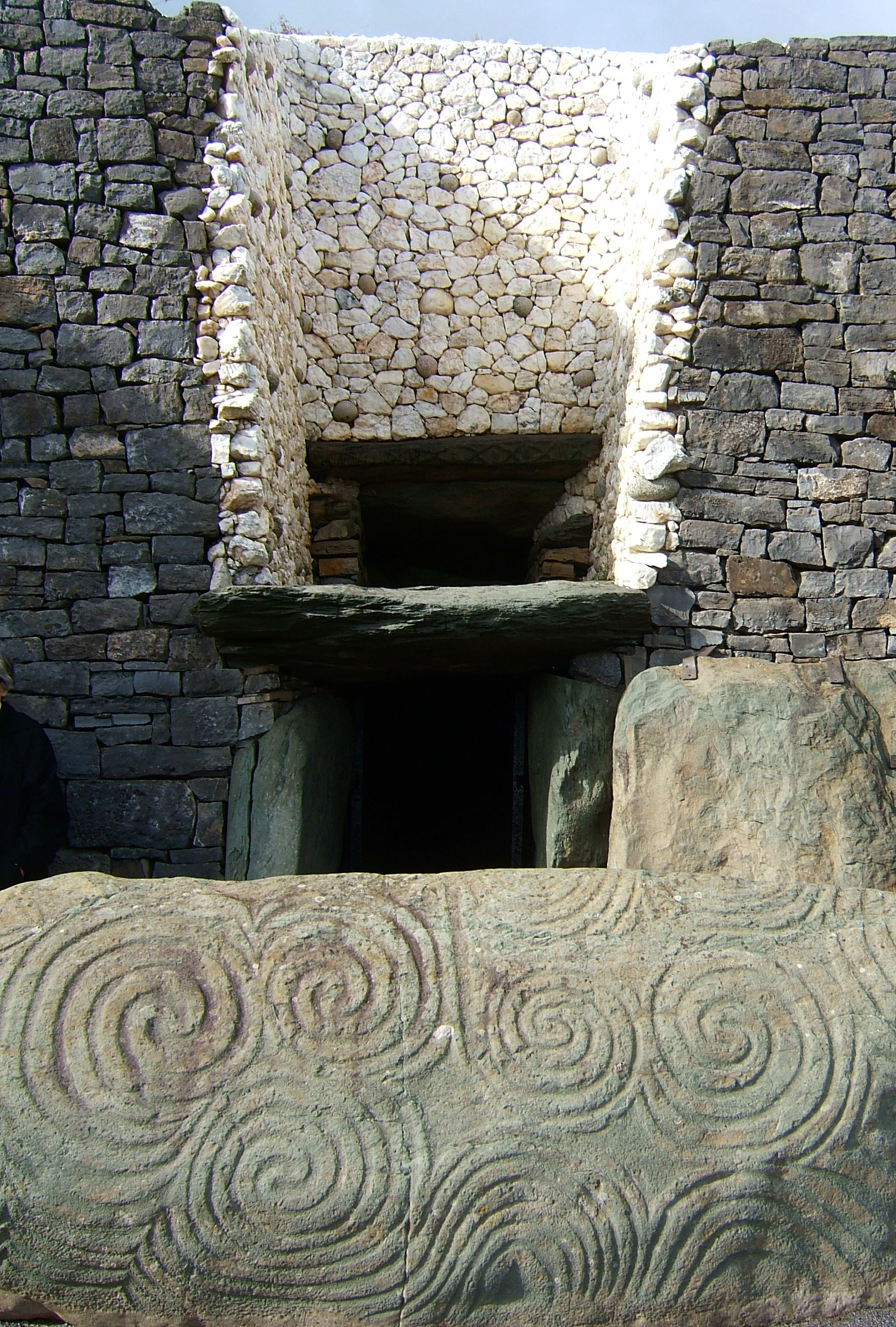
The rising Sun illuminates the inner chamber of Newgrange only at the winter solstice.

Before the Second Battle of Mag Tuired the Dagda builds a fortress for Bres called Dún Brese and is also forced by the Fomorian kings Elatha, Indech, and Tethra to build raths. In the lead up to the Second Battle of Mag Tuired, when Lugh asks Dagda what power he will wield over the Fomorian host, he responds that he "will take the side of the men of Erin both in mutual smiting and destruction and wizardry. Their bones under my club will be as many as hailstones under feet of herds of horses".

The Dagda has an affair with Boann, the goddess of the River Boyne. She lives at Brú na Bóinne with her husband Elcmar. The Dagda impregnates her after sending Elcmar away on a one-day errand. To hide the pregnancy from Elcmar, the Dagda casts a spell on him, making "the sun stand still" so he will not notice the passing of time. Meanwhile, Boann gives birth to Aengus, who is also known as Maccán Óg ('the young son'). Eventually, Aengus learns that the Dagda is his true father and asks him for a portion of land. In some versions of the tale, the Dagda helps Aengus take ownership of the Brú from Elcmar. Aengus asks and is given the Brú for láa ocus aidche; because in Old Irish this could mean either "a day and a night" or "day and night", Aengus claims it forever. Other versions have Aengus taking over the Brú from the Dagda himself by using the same trick.

It has been suggested that this tale represents the winter solstice illumination of Newgrange at Brú na Bóinne, during which the sunbeam (the Dagda) enters the inner chamber (the womb of Boann) when the sun's path stands still. The word solstice (Irish grianstad) means sun-standstill. The conception of Aengus may represent the 'rebirth' of the sun at the winter solstice, him taking over the Brú from an older god representing the growing sun taking over from the waning sun.

The Tochmarc Étaíne, tells the story of how Bóand conceives Aengus by the Dagda. In Aislinge Óenguso or "The Dream of Aengus" the Dagda and Boand help Aengus to find a mysterious woman who he has fallen in love with in his dreams.

In a poem about Mag Muirthemne, the Dagda banishes an octopus with his "mace of wrath" using the following words: "Turn thy hollow head! Turn thy ravening body! Turn thy resorbent forehead! Avaunt! Begone!", the sea receded with the creature and the plain of Mag Muirthemne was left behind.

In the Dindsenchas the Dagda is described as swift with a poison draught and as a justly dealing lord. He is also called a King of Erin with hosts of hostages, a noble, slender prince, and the father of Cermait, Aengus, and Aed.

He is credited with a seventy- or eighty-year reign (depending on source) over the Tuatha Dé Danann, before dying at Brú na Bóinne, finally succumbing to a wound inflicted by Cethlenn during the battle of Mag Tuired.

== Parallels ==
The Dagda has similarities with the later harvest figure Crom Dubh. He also has similarities with the Gaulish god Sucellos, who is depicted with a hammer and a pot, and the Roman god Dīs Pater.

== Explanatory notes ==
Preceded by Lug	High King of Ireland; AFM 1830–1750 BC; FFE 1407–1337 BC	Succeeded by Delbáeth
