= Fomorians =

Supernatural race in Irish mythology

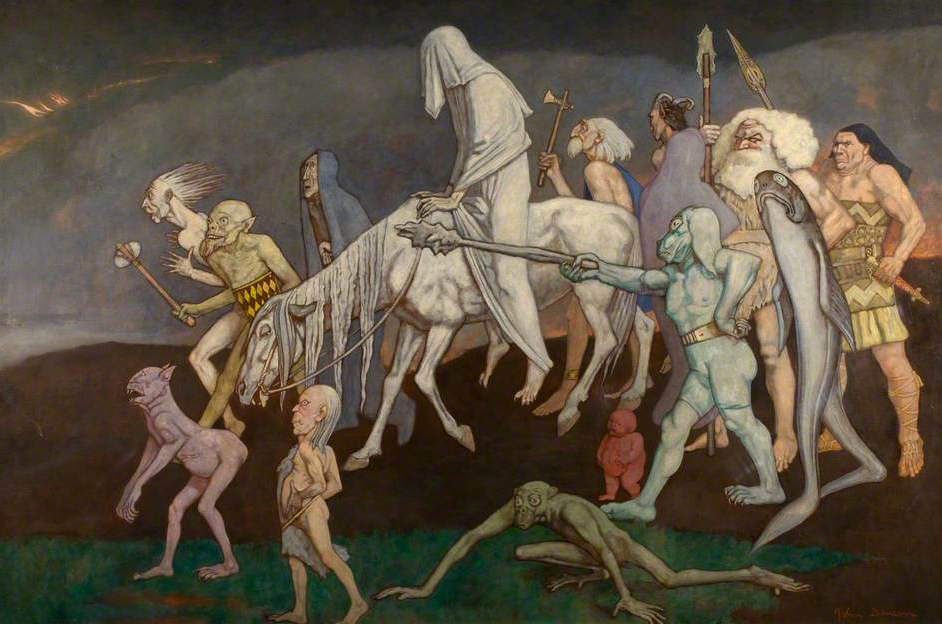
The Fomorians, as depicted by John Duncan (1912)

The Fomorians or Fomori (Old Irish: Fomóire, Modern Irish: Fomhóraigh / Fomóraigh) are a supernatural race in Irish mythology, who are often portrayed as hostile and monstrous beings. Originally they were said to come from under the sea or the earth. Later, they were portrayed as sea raiders and giants. They are enemies of Ireland's first settlers and opponents of the Tuatha Dé Danann, the other supernatural race in Irish mythology; although some members of the two races have offspring. The Tuatha Dé Danann defeat the Fomorians in the Battle of Mag Tuired. This has been likened to other Indo-European myths of a war between gods, such as the Æsir and Vanir War in Norse mythology, the Titanomachy (Olympian-Titan War) in Greek mythology, and the Devas and Asuras in Indian mythology.

One theory is that the Fomorians were supernatural beings representing the wild or destructive powers of nature; personifications of chaos, darkness, death, blight and drought.

== Name ==
In Old and Middle Irish, the race is usually called the Fomóire or Fomóiri (plural), and an individual member is called a Fomóir (singular). In Middle Irish, they are also called the Fomóraiġ (plural) and a Fomórach (singular). This is spelt Fomhóraigh/Fomóraigh (plural) and Fomhórach (singular) in Modern Irish. Their name is Latinized as Muiridi in the Lebor Bretnach. In English, they are called the Fomorians, Fomori or Fomors.

The etymology of the name is debated. The first part is generally agreed to be the Old Irish fo, meaning under, below, lower, beneath, nether, etc. The meaning of the second part is unclear. One suggestion is that it comes from Old Irish mur (sea), and that the name means something like "the undersea ones". This was the interpretation offered by some medieval Irish writers. Another suggestion is that it comes from mór (great/big) and means something like "the great under(world) ones", "the under(world) giants" or "the nether giants". A third suggestion, which has more support among scholars, is that it comes from a hypothetical Old Irish term for a demon or phantom, found in the name of The Morrígan and cognate with the archaic English word "mare" (which survives in "nightmare"). The name would thus mean something like "underworld demons/phantoms" or "nether demons/phantoms". Building on this, Marie-Louise Sjoestedt interprets the name as meaning "inferior" or "latent demons", saying the Fomorians are "like the powers of chaos, ever latent and hostile to cosmic order". John T. Koch suggests a relationship with Tartessian omuŕik.

== Description ==
Originally the Fomorians seem to have been regarded as malevolent spirits dwelling underwater and in the nether regions of the earth. In one of the earliest references to them, a probably 7th-century elegy for Mess-Telmann, they are said to dwell "under the worlds of men". Later they were portrayed as sea raiders. This was influenced by the Viking raids on Ireland that were taking place around that time.

They are often portrayed as monstrous. Sometimes they are said to have the body of a man and the head of a goat, according to an 11th-century text in Lebor na hUidre (the Book of the Dun Cow), or to have had one eye, one arm and one leg. However, those Fomorians who have relationships with the Tuath Dé, such as Elatha and his son Bres, were portrayed as darkly beautiful.

The Fomorians are the enemies of Ireland's first settlers and of the supernatural Tuath Dé, with whom they are contrasted. However, in some sources there is an overlap between the Fomorians and Tuath Dé. A figure called Tethra is named as presiding over both races.

The conflict between the Tuath Dé and Fomorians has been likened to other Indo-European myths of a war between gods: between Æsir and Vanir in Norse mythology, between Olympians and Titans in Greek mythology, and between Devas and Asuras in Vedic mythology. Dáithí Ó hÓgáin writes that the Tuath Dé gaining agricultural knowledge from the Fomorians is similar to the Norse and Vedic versions, where the defeated races represent the fertility of the soil.

== Myths ==
The medieval myth of Partholón says that his followers were the first to invade Ireland after the flood which occurred in Genesis, but the Fomorians were already there: Geoffrey Keating reports a tradition that the Fomorians, led by Cichol Gricenchos, had arrived two hundred years earlier and lived on fish and fowl until Partholon came (this detail only appears in the 3rd Redaction of the Lebor Gabála Érenn), bringing the plough and oxen. Partholon defeated Cíocal in the Battle of Mag Itha, but all his people later died of plague.

Then came Nemed and his followers. Ireland is said to have been empty for thirty years following the death of Partholon's people, but Nemed and his followers encountered the Fomorians when they arrived. At this point, Céitinn reports another tradition that the Fomorians were seafarers from the Middle East, descended from Ham, son of Noah. Nemed defeated them in several battles, killing their kings Gann and Sengann, (Note: Note that there were also two Fir Bolg kings called Gann and Sengann.) but two new Fomorian leaders arose: Conand son of Faebar, who lived in Conand's Tower on Tory Island, County Donegal, and Morc son of Dela (note that the first generation of the Fir Bolg were also said to be sons of Dela).

After Nemed's death, Conand and Morc enslaved his people and demanded a heavy tribute: two thirds of their children, grain and cattle. Nemed's son Fergus Lethderg gathered an army of sixty thousand, rose up against them and destroyed Conand's Tower, but Morc attacked them with a huge fleet, and there was great slaughter on both sides. The sea rose over them and drowned most of the survivors: only thirty of Nemed's people escaped in a single ship, scattering to the other parts of the world. The next invasion was by the Fir Bolg, who did not encounter the Fomorians.

Next, the Tuatha Dé Danann, who are usually supposed to have been the gods of the Goidelic Irish, defeated the Fir Bolg in the first Battle of Mag Tuired and took possession of Ireland. Because their king, Nuada Airgetlám, had lost an arm in the battle and was no longer physically whole, their first king in Ireland was the half-Fomorian Bres. He was the result of a union between Ériu of the Tuatha Dé Danann and the Fomorian prince Elatha, who had come to her one night by sea on a silver boat. Both Elatha and Bres are described as very beautiful. However Bres turned out to be a bad king who forced the Tuatha Dé to work as slaves and pay tribute to the Fomorians. He lost authority when he was satirised for neglecting his kingly duties of hospitality. Nuada was restored to the kingship after his arm was replaced with a working one of silver, but the Tuatha Dé's oppression by the Fomorians continued.

Bres fled to his father, Elatha, and asked for his help to restore him to the kingship. Elatha refused, on the grounds that he should not seek to gain by foul means what he couldn't keep by fair. Bres instead turned to Balor, a more warlike Fomorian chief living on Tory Island, and raised an army.

The Tuatha Dé Danann also prepared for war, under another half-Fomorian leader, Lug. His father was Cian of the Tuatha Dé, and his mother was Balor's daughter Ethniu. This is presented as a dynastic marriage in early texts, but folklore preserves a more elaborate story, reminiscent of the story of Perseus from Greek mythology. Balor, who had been given a prophecy that he would be killed by his own grandson, locked Ethniu in a glass tower to keep her away from men. But when he stole Cian's magical cow, Cian got his revenge by gaining entry to the tower, with the help of a druidess called Biróg, and seducing her. She gave birth to triplets, which Balor ordered drowned. Two of the babies either died or turned into the first seals, but Biróg saved one, Lug, and gave him to Manannán and Tailtiu to foster. As an adult, Lug gained entry to Nuada's court through his mastery of every art, and was given command over the army.

The second Battle of Mag Tuired was fought between the Fomorians under Balor and the Tuatha Dé under Lug. When the two forces met on the field of battle, it was said that to attack the fierce Fomorian flank was like striking a head against a cliff, placing a hand into a serpent's nest, or facing up to fire. Balor killed Nuada with his terrible, poisonous eye that killed all it looked upon. Lug faced his grandfather, but as he was opening his eye Lug shot a sling-stone that drove his eye out the back of his head, wreaking havoc on the Fomorian army behind. After Balor's death the Fomorians were defeated and driven into the sea.

According to the Irish version of the Historia Britonum of Nennius, the Fomorians are referred to as mariners who were forced into a tower near the sea by the Tuatha Dé Danann. Then the Irish or otherwise descendants of Nemed with Fergus red-side at the lead, pushed all the Fomorians into the sea, with the exception of one ship that survived.

=== The Training of Cú Chulainn ===
The Fomorians were still around at the time of Cú Chulainn. In the medieval Irish tale entitled The Training of Cú Chulainn, preserved as a copy by Richard Tipper in British Library, Egerton MS 106, it gives the following mention:

Then they parted from each other, and Cúchulainn went and looked forth on the great sea. As he was there he beheld a great assembly on the strand nearest to him, to wit, a hundred men and a hundred women seated in the bosom of the haven and the shore, and among them a maiden shapely, dear and beautiful, the most distinguished damsel of the world's women, and they a-weeping and lamenting around the damsel. Cúchulainn came to the place and saluted them. "What is this sorrow or the misery upon you?" says Cúchulainn. The damsel answered and this she said: "A royal tribute which the tribe of Fomorians carry out of this country every seventh year, namely, the first-born of the king's children. And at this time it has come to me to go as that tribute, for to the king I am the dearest of his children.""What number comes to lift that tribute?" asks Cúchulainn. "Three sons of Alatrom of the Fomorians," she answers, "and Dub, Mell and Dubros are their names." Not long had they been at those talks when they saw the well-manned, full-great vessel approaching them over the furious waves of the sea. And when the damsel's people saw the ship coming, they all fled from her, and not a single person remained in her company save only Cúchulainn. And thus was that vessel: a single warrior, dark, gloomy, devilish, on the stern of that good ship, and he was laughing roughly, ill-fatedly, so that every one saw his entrails and his bowels through the body of his gullet. "What is that mirthfulness on the big man?" asks Cúchulainn. "Because," says the damsel, "he deems it excellent that thou shouldst be an addition to his tribute in this year rather than in any other year." "By my conscience," says Cúchulainn, "it would not be right for him to brag thus regarding me if he knew what would come of it." Then the big man came ashore to them into the strand, and stretched forth his long, sinewy, hideous arm to seize Cúchulainn in the very front of his royal tribute. Straightway Cúchulainn raised his right hand, and bared his sword, and gave a blow to the big man and struck off his head, so that he was the first that fell by Cúchulainn after having completed his training. And thereafter the other two fell by him, and he left them thus, neck to neck.

In later times, any settled pirates or seaborne raiders were labelled Fomorians and the original meaning of the word was forgotten.

== List of Fomorians ==
- Indech, King of the Fomorians
- Balor
- Bres
- Cethlenn
- Cichol Gricenchos
- Conand
- Elatha
- Ethniu
- Tethra
- Manannán under his byname the Gilla Decair
- Tuiri Tortbuillech
- Goll
- Irgoll
- Loscenn-lomm
- Octriallach, son of Indech
- Omna and Bagna
- Regan

=== Genealogy ===
The Genealogies from Rawlinson B 502 lists the full genealogy of the Fomorians going back to the Biblical Noah, who was 10th from Adam and Eve.

Rawlinson B 502, Section 26, page 330, says:

Bress m. Elathan m. Delbáeth m. Deirgthind m. Ochtaich m. Sithchind m. Molaich m. Lárgluind m. Ciarraill m. Fóesaim m. Meircill m. Leccduib m. Iachtaich m. Libuirnn m. Lathairn m. Soairtt m. Sibuirt m. Siuccat m. Stairnn m. Saltait m. Cair m. h-Iphit m. Philist m. Fuith m. Caim m. Nóe m. Laméch
