= Cath Maige Tuired =

Either of two texts in the Mythological Cycle of Irish mythology

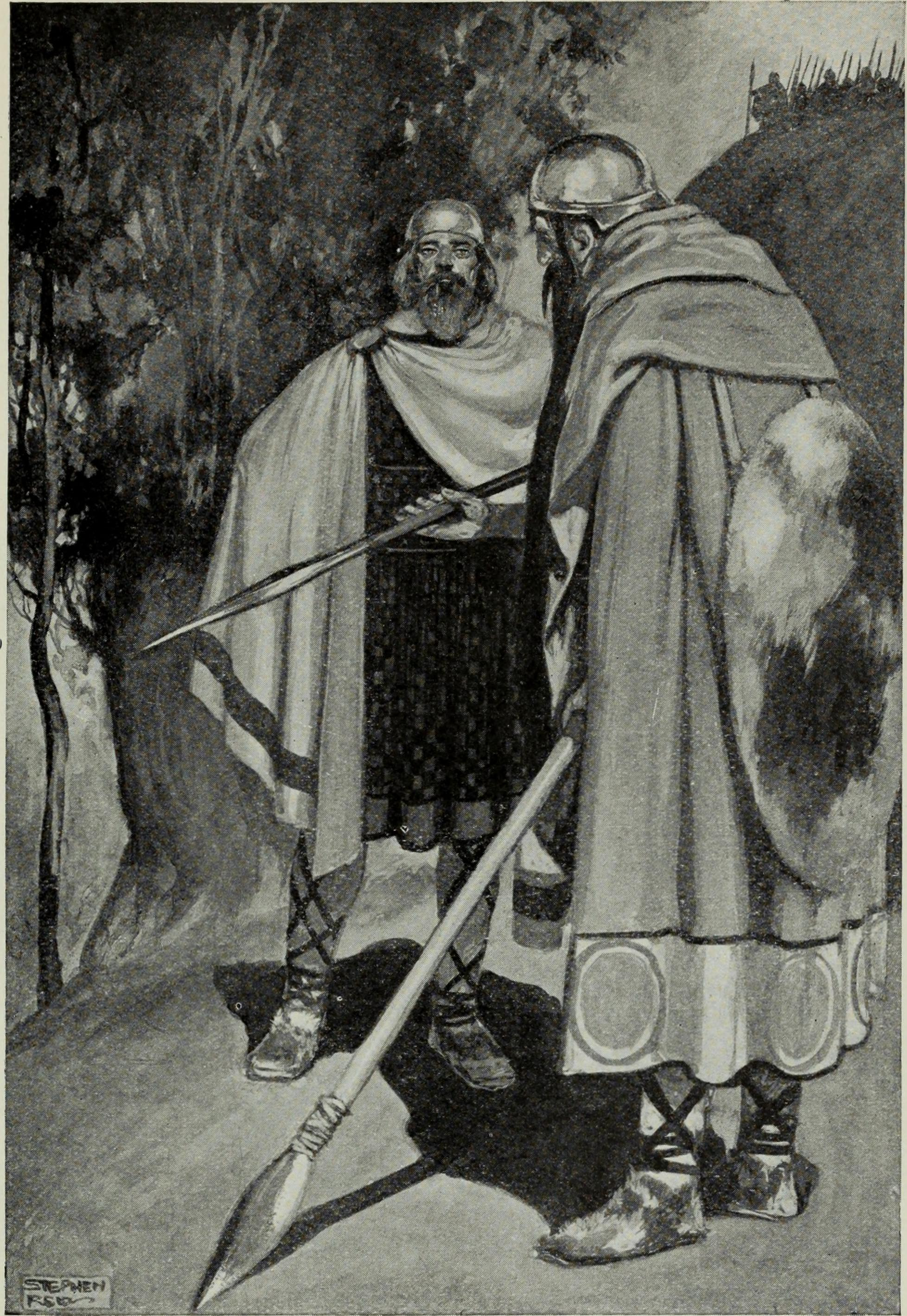
Ambassadors of the Fir Bolg and Tuath Dé meeting before the Battle of Moytura, an illustration by Stephen Reid in T. W. Rolleston's Myths & Legends of the Celtic Race, 1911

Cath Maige Tuired (Modern Irish: Cath Maighe Tuireadh; transl. "The Battle of Magh Tuireadh") is the name of two saga texts of the Mythological Cycle of Irish mythology. The two texts tell of battles fought by the Tuatha Dé Danann, the first against the Fir Bolg, the second against the Fomorians.

== Etymology ==
The Old Irish placename Mag Tuired (Modern Irish: Magh Tuireadh; anglicised Moytura or Moytirra) is believed to mean "plain of pillars" or "plain of towers". It refers to two separate places, both in Connacht: the first near Cong, County Mayo on the border with County Galway in the territory of Conmaicne Cuile; the second by Lough Arrow in County Sligo.

== The First Battle of Mag Tuired ==
The first text, sometimes called Cét-chath Maige Tuired ("The First Battle of Mag Tuired") or Cath Maighe Tuireadh Cunga ("The Battle of Mag Tuired Conga") or Cath Maighe Tuireadh Theas ("The Battle of Southern Mag Tuired"), relates how the Tuatha Dé Danann took Ireland from the Fir Bolg, who then inhabited the island. It begins with the children of Nemed, an earlier group of inhabitants of Ireland, leaving for Greece to escape their oppression by the Fomorians. A group of Nemed's descendants, the Fir Bolg, return to Ireland and conquer it, occupying it for thirty years until the coming of the Tuatha Dé Danann, another group of Nemed's descendants.

The Tuatha Dé Danann, led by their king, Nuada, come to Ireland in three hundred ships from the islands of the north. Their arrival is foreseen in a dream by the Fir Bolg king, Eochaid mac Eirc. When they land, they burn their ships. Negotiations begin between Sreng, the champion of the Fir Bolg, and Bres of the Tuatha Dé Danann, and Bres demands that the Fir Bolg either give battle or cede half of Ireland to them. The Fir Bolg choose battle. After a delay to prepare weapons, they met at the Pass of Balgatan, and the battle raged for four days. Nuada encounters Sreng, and with one swing of his sword, Sreng cuts off Nuada's right hand. However, the Tuatha Dé Danann gain the ascendancy. A truce is called, and the Fir Bolg are given three options: leave Ireland, share the land with the Tuatha Dé Danann, or continue the battle. They choose to fight. Sreng challenges Nuada to single combat. Nuada accepts on the condition that Sreng ties up one arm to make the combat fair, but Sreng rejects this condition. The Tuatha Dé Danann then decide to offer the Fir Bolg one of the provinces of Ireland. Sreng chooses Cóiced Ol nEchmacht, and the two sides make peace.

Dian Cecht, the god of physicians, made an artificial hand of silver for Nuada, and Nuada was named Nuada Airgetlám (Nuada of the Silver Hand). However, the goddess Brigid had told the Tuatha Dé Danann that no one with a blemish can rule them, and, having lost a hand, the Tuatha Dé Danann had to choose another king. They chose Bres, son of Elatha, king of the Fomorians or the Children of Domnu. Seven years later, Bres dies after taking a drink while hunting, and Nuada, having had his arm replaced, is restored.

== The Second Battle of Mag Tuired ==
The second text of this name, also known as Cath Dédenach Maige Tuired ("The Last Battle of Mag Tuired"), Cath Tánaiste Maige Tuired ("The Second Battle of Mag Tuired"), and Cath Maighe Tuireadh Thuaidh ("The Battle of Northern Mag Tuired"), tells how the Tuatha Dé Danann, having conquered Ireland, fall under the oppression of the Fomorians, and then fight a battle to free themselves from this oppression. It expands on references to the battle in Lebor Gabála Érenn and the Irish Annals, and is one of the richest sources of tales of the former Irish gods. It is found in a 16th-century manuscript, but is believed to be a composite work compiled in the 12th century from 9th-century material.

It begins with a brief account of the first battle, the loss of Nuada's arm, and his replacement as king by Bres, and then tells how Bres was conceived from a union between Ériu of the Tuatha Dé Danann and Elatha of the Fomorians. Because of his ancestry, Bres oppressed the Tuatha Dé Danann, making the noblest of them do menial work, imposing heavy tribute, and failing to show the level of hospitality expected of a king. He is deposed as king, and Nuada, who has had his arm replaced with one of silver by the physician Dian Cecht (whose son Miach caused flesh to grow over it), is restored. Bres appeals for assistance from the Fomorians to take back the kingship, and although his father Elatha refuses, another Fomorian leader, Balor of the Evil Eye, agrees to help him and raises a huge army. Meanwhile, Lugh, another product of a Tuatha Dé Danann and Fomorian union, arrives at Nuada's court, and, after impressing the king with his many talents, is given command of the Tuatha Dé Danann. Nuada is killed by Balor in the battle, but Lugh, Balor's grandson, kills the Fomorian leader with his sling, smashing his deadly eye through the back of his head, where it wreaks havoc on the Fomorian ranks. Bres is found alive in the aftermath of the battle, and is spared on the condition that he teach the Tuatha Dé Danann how to plough, sow and reap. Finally, Lugh, the Dagda and Ogma rescue the Dagda's harp, Uaithne, which had been captured by the retreating Fomorians.

== Adaptations ==
- Pádraic Colum adapted Cath Maige Tuired into the play Moytura: A Play for Dancers, first performed during the 1963 Dublin Theatre Festival (24 September–6 October 1963).
