= Chronica Gentis Scotorum =

Scottish history by John of Fordun

The Chronica Gentis Scotorum or Chronicles of the Scottish People was the first substantial work of Scottish history. It was written by John of Fordun, a priest of the diocese of St. Andrews and chaplain of the church of Aberdeen. Before his death, he had finished the first five books down to the reign of David I (1124–53) and had arranged his remaining materials, the last of which was dated 1385.

== Continuations ==
Andrew of Wyntoun, a canon regular of St Andrews and prior to the St Serf's Inch Priory in Loch Leven, wrote a chronicle of Scotland between 1420 and 1424, but his work shows no familiarity with Fordun's. However, in 1441, Walter Bower (or Bowmaker), abbot of Inchcolm, continued Fordun's history to the year 1437, adding material to the death of James I (1437), incorporating additional material, and entitling his work the Scotichronicon.

Copies were preserved in leading religious houses by whose names the manuscripts are known, including the Book of Paisley, the Book of Scone, the Book of Cupar, and the Chronicle of Icolmkill. Though the names of Patrick Russell, a Carthusian monk of the monastery of Charterhouse in Perth, and Magnus MacCulloch, secretary to the archbishop of St Andrews, are attached to some of these copies, they remain in essence Walter Bower's compilations.

== Key features of the chronicle ==
According to historian William F. Skene, the key features of Fordun's history of early Scotland include the following:

- The Scots derived their origin from Gathelus, son of Neolus, king of Greece, who, in the time of Moses, went to Egypt, where he married Scota, a daughter of the pharaoh, after which he led the Scots to Spain.
- From Spain, several groups went to Ireland, the last of which was under the leadership of Simon Breac, son of the king of Spain, who brought with him the Stone of Scone, the coronation seat of the Scottish kings, which, according to Fordun, was marble.
- Under Breac's great-grandson, Ethachius Rothay, the Scots went to Albion, renaming it Scotia. The Picts then settled in Scotland and intermarried with the Scots.
- In 330 BC, during the time of their king Ferchard, the Scots chose the king's son Fergus as their leader. Fergus, whose territory extended from the sea and the western isles to Drumalban, brought the coronation stone from Ireland.
- Rether, the great-grandson of Fergus, brought over another colony of Scots from Ireland and united them with the Scots already established on the mainland and the islands.
- In AD 203, the Scots converted to Christianity.
- In AD 360, Eugenius, king of the Scots, was killed by the Picts and Britons, who drove the Scots (under the leadership of Ethodius and Erth, brother and nephew of Eugenius, respectively) back to Ireland.
- After their departure, the relics of St Andrew, according to Fordun, were brought to Scotland and received by Hurgurst, king of the Picts.
- In AD 403, the Scots returned under the leadership of Erth, son of Fergus, and occupied Ergadia. Erth was the ancestor of forty-five Scots kings, ending with Kenneth MacAlpin, who led the Scots out of Ergadia, conquered the Picts, and reigned over the whole of Scotland.
- Fordun concluded with a list of Scottish kings from Kenneth MacAlpin to David I.

== See also ==
- Gesta Annalia
