= Scota =

Character in medieval Irish and Scottish legend

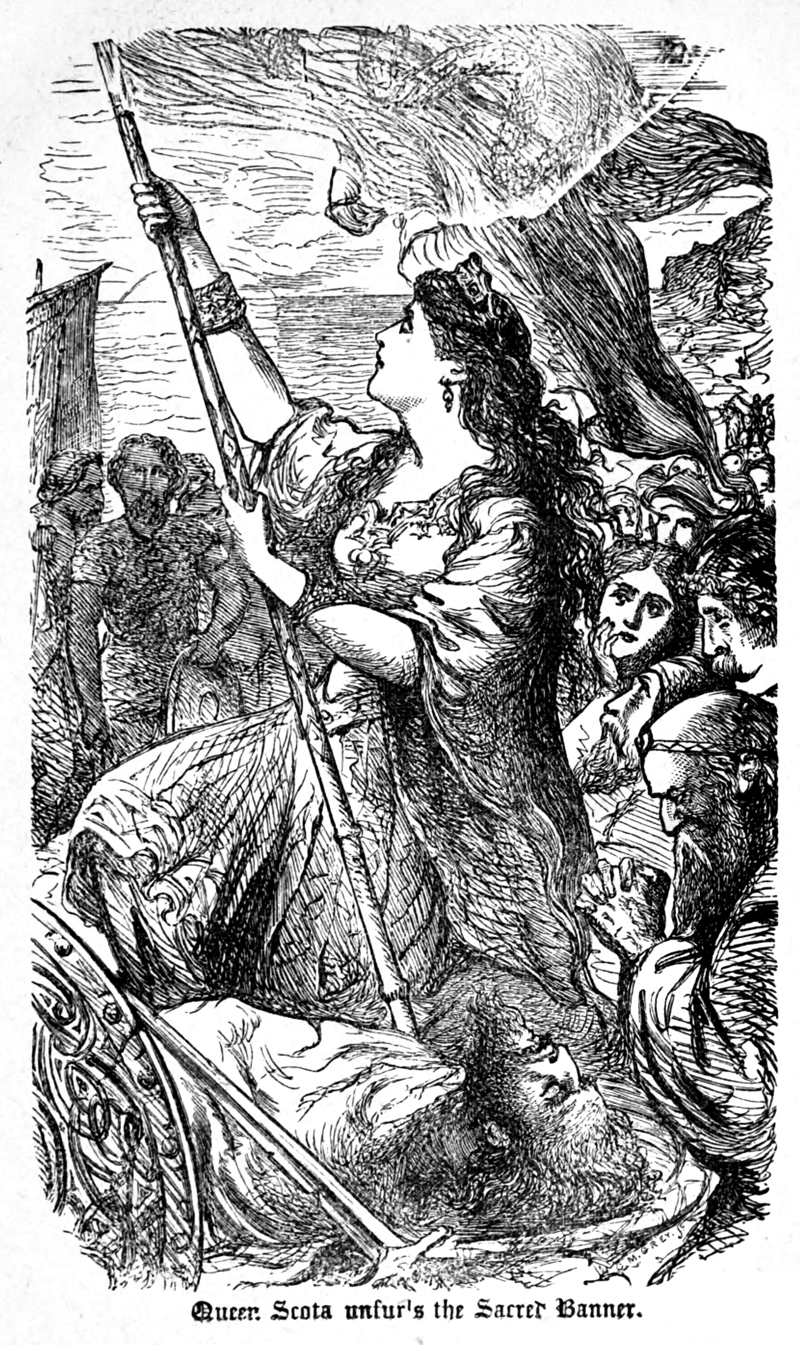
"Queen Scota unfurls the sacred banner", illustration from an 1867 book of Irish history

In medieval Irish and Scottish legend, Scota or Scotia is the daughter of an Egyptian pharaoh and ancestor of the Gaels. She is said to be the origin of their Latin name Scoti, but historians say she (and her alleged ancestors and spouses) was purely mythological and was created to explain the name and to fit the Gaels into a historical narrative.

== Early sources ==
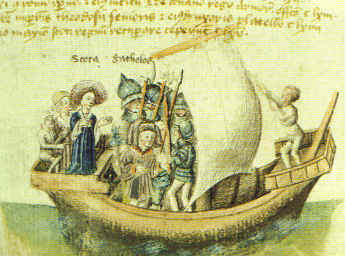
Scota (left) with Goídel Glas voyaging from Egypt, as depicted in a 15th-century manuscript of the Scotichronicon of Walter Bower; in this version Scota and Goídel Glas (Latinized as Gaythelos) are wife and husband.

Edward J. Cowan traced the first mention of Scota in literature to the 12th century. Scota appears in the Irish chronicle Book of Leinster, in a redaction of the Lebor Gabála Érenn. The 9th-century Historia Brittonum contains the earliest surviving version of the Lebor Gabala Erenn story (centred on an unnamed Goídel Glas), but this earliest version does not mention Scota even indirectly.

The Lebor Gabála Érenn states that Scota was the mother of Goidel Glas, the eponymous ancestor of the Gaels. This Scota was the daughter of an Egyptian pharaoh named Cingris, a likely reference to Pharaoh Chenchres from the kings list of Jerome (who is called Akenkheres in Egyptian records). She marries Goidel's father Niul, son of Fénius Farsaid (the inventor of letters and legendary ancestor of the Phoenicians).

Niul son of Fénius returns to Babylon as part of an effort to study the confusion of languages. He is a scholar of languages and is invited by Pharaoh Cingris to Egypt to take Scota's hand in marriage. Scota and Niul's son, Goídel, who was saved by a prayer from Moses after being bitten by a snake, is said to have created the Gaelic language by combining the best features of the 72 languages then in existence. In Fordun's early Scottish version, Gaythelos, as he calls Goídel Glas, is the son of "a certain king of the countries of Greece, Neolus, or Heolaus, by name", who was exiled to Egypt and took service with the Pharaoh, marrying Pharaoh's daughter Scota. The Lebor Gabála Érenn describes him as a Scythian, yet the famed Irish genealogist John O'Hart notes that Niul's father was a Phoenician, the brother of the legendary Cadmus.

Other twelfth-century sources state that Scota was the wife of Geytholos (Goídel Glas), rather than his mother, and was the founder of the Scots and Gaels after they were exiled from Egypt.

Other manuscripts of the Lebor Gabála Érenn contain a legend of a Scotia who was the wife of Goidel's descendant Míl Espáine of ancient Iberia. This Scotia's Grave is a famous landmark in Munster.

The Gaels, known in Gaelic as Goídel and in Latin as Scoti, are said to be named after Goidel and Scota. However, historians say they were characters created to explain the names and to fit the Gaels into a historical narrative.

== Scota and the Stone of Scone ==
Baldred Bisset is credited with being the first to connect the Stone of Scone with the Scota foundation legends in his 1301 work Processus, putting forward an argument that Scotland, not Ireland, was where the original Scota homeland lay.

Bisset wanted to legitimize a Scottish (as opposed to English) accession to the throne when Alexander III of Scotland died in 1286. At his coronation in 1249, Alexander himself heard his royal genealogy recited generations back to Scota. Bisset attempted to legitimize a Scottish accession by highlighting Scota's importance as the transporter of the Stone of Scone from Ancient Egypt, during the Exodus of Moses, to Scotland. In 1296, the Stone was captured by Edward I of England and taken to Westminster Abbey. In 1323, Robert the Bruce used Bisset's legend connecting Scota to the Stone in an attempt to return it to Scone Abbey in Scotland.

The 15th-century English chronicler John Hardyng later attempted to debunk Bisset's claims.

== Later sources ==
Andrew of Wyntoun's Orygynale Cronykil of Scotland and John of Fordun's Chronica Gentis Scotorum (1385) are sources of the Scota legends, alongside Thomas Grey's Scalacronica (1362). Hector Boece's 16th-century Historia Gentis Scotorum ("History of the Scottish People") also mentions the Scota foundation myth.

Walter Bower's 15th-century Scotichronicon included the first illustrations of the legends. The 16th-century writer Hector Boece included the story of Scota in his Historia Gentis Scotorum, and William Stewart made a verse translation in the Scots language for the Scottish royal court.

== Scota's Grave ==
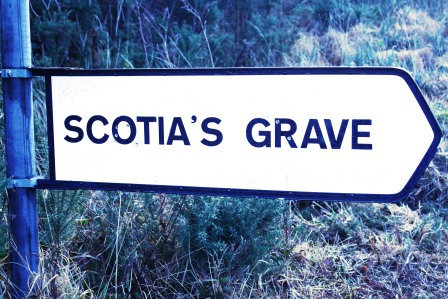
Signpost on by-road, south of Tralee

"Scota's Grave" or "Scotia's Grave" is a rock feature in Gleann Scoithín or 'Glenscoheen', south of Tralee in County Kerry, Ireland. According to the National Monuments Service, "Following a site inspection in 1999 it was concluded that the evidence was not sufficient to warrant accepting this as an archaeological monument".

== See also ==
- Scotia
- Šērūʾa-ēṭirat
