= Cingris =

Mythical figure

Cingris or Cincris also known as Achencres was a mythological Pharaoh from the Lebor Gabála Érenn. He would also be the father of the legendary princess Scota.

== Name ==
The name Cingris appears in the Lebor Gabála Érenn, where he is identified as a Pharaoh whose host was drowned in the Red Sea, suggesting a connection to the biblical Exodus narrative. In John O'Hart’s Irish Pedigrees; or, The Origin and Stem of the Irish Nation (1892), Scota's father is referred to generically as Pharaoh, without a specific name, indicating he invited Nel to Egypt and gave him Scota's hand in marriage. In Scottish tradition, as recorded in John of Fordun’s Chronica Gentis Scotorum (c. 1360), Scota's father is named Achencres. The name Cingris could be a possible reference to Pharaoh Chenchres from the kings list of Jerome (who is called Akhenaten in Egyptian records).

== Legend ==
The Lebor Gabála Érenn describes a series of invasions or settlements of Ireland, culminating with the arrival of the Milesians, considered the ancestors of the modern Irish. Cingris plays a pivotal role in this narrative as the father of Scota, who marries Nel, son of Fénius Farsaid, a Babylonian scholar who studied languages after the confusion of tongues at Babel. Their son, Goídel Glas, is credited with creating the Gaelic language by combining elements of the 72 languages then in existence and is regarded as the eponymous ancestor of the Gaels. Additionally, in the Lebor Gabála Érenn, Cingris is explicitly described as the Pharaoh whose host was "extinguished" in the Red Sea, aligning his story with the biblical account of the Pharaoh's destruction during the Exodus. This connection suggests that medieval Irish scholars sought to integrate their mythology with biblical history. Scota's name is said to be the origin of the Latin term Scoti, historically used to refer to the Irish and later the Scots. After her time in Egypt, her descendants migrated through various regions, including Crete, Scythia, and Spain, before reaching Ireland as the Milesians.

In John O'Hart's Irish Pedigrees, the narrative is similar but less specific about the Pharaoh's identity. The Pharaoh invites Nel to Egypt to teach, granting him land near the Red Sea and Scota in marriage. Their descendants are called Scots, reinforcing the etymological link to Scota. In contrast, John of Fordun’s Chronica Gentis Scotorum adapts the story for a Scottish audience, naming Scota's father as Achencres and describing her as the wife of Gaythelos (an alternative name for Goídel Glas), who is exiled to Egypt and marries the Pharaoh's daughter
