= D. E. R. Watt =

Scottish historian (1926–2004)

Donald Elmslie Robertson Watt FRSE (15 August 1926 – 18 April 2004) was a Scottish historian and Professor Emeritus at St Andrews University.

Donald Watt was the son of Theodore Watt, managing director of the Aberdeen University Press. Watt studied at Aberdeen Grammar School, before studying history at University of Aberdeen. He graduated in 1950, and moved to Oriel College, Oxford, receiving his D. Phil in 1957.

Watt taught history at St Andrews University for his entire career, except for one year's study at Columbia University. He worked for many years on editing and translating a nine volume edition, the first since 1759, of Abbot Walter Bower's Scotichronicon, a key resource for Scotland in the late Middle Ages. Professor Watt also published on the Scottish church where he was the acknowledged expert on sources, holding the chair in Scottish Church History at St Andrews.

He worked for the publication of the Atlas of Scottish History, issued by the University of Edinburgh in 1975 and again, with revisions, in 1995. He served as co-editor of the Scottish Historical Review for eight years, and as president of the Scottish History Society for four.

In 2000, he was made an honorary Doctor of Letters by the University of Glasgow.

== Select bibliography ==
=== Books ===
- Biographical Dictionary of Scottish Graduates to A.D. 1410, 1977, Oxford: Clarendon Press, ISBN 0-19-822447-8
- (series editor; editor, with John MacQueen, Winifred MacQueen, and others) Walter Bower's Scotichronicon (9 vols, 1987–1997)
- (editor) A history book for Scots : selections from the Scotichronicon (1998)
- Crawford, Barbara E. (editor), Church, chronicle and learning in medieval and early Renaissance Scotland: essays presented to Donald Watt on the occasion of the completion of the publication of Bower's Scotichronicon. (1999)
- Medieval Church Councils in Scotland, Edinburgh: T & T Clark, (2000) ISBN 0-567-08731-X
- (with N. Shead) Heads of religious houses in Scotland from the twelfth to the sixteenth centuries (2001)

=== Articles ===
- (with Athol L. Murray) Fasti Ecclesiae Scoticanae medii aevi : ad annum 1638, New Series, Volume 25 (Revised ed.), Edinburgh: The Scottish Record Society, ISBN 0-902054-19-8, ISSN 0143-9448
