= Walter Goodall =

Scottish writer

- Born: c. 1706; Banffshire, Scotland
- Died: 28 July 1766 (aged c. 60)
- Occupations: Writer, librarian
- Parent: John Goodall

Walter Goodall (c. 1706 – 28 July 1766) was a Scottish historical writer, born in Banffshire, and educated at King's College, University of Aberdeen. Later he became assistant librarian to the Advocates' Library in Edinburgh.

In 1754, Goodall published an Examination of the Letters said to have been written by Mary Queen of Scots on Casket letters. Printing the letters, he contested their authenticity. He also edited John of Fordun's Scotichronicon (1759).

== Life ==
He was the eldest son of John Goodall, a farmer in Banffshire. He was educated at King's College, Old Aberdeen, which he entered in 1723, but left without taking a degree. In 1730, he obtained employment in the Advocates' Library, Edinburgh, and in 1735 became sub-librarian.

Goodall died in poverty on 28 July 1766.

== Works ==
Walter Goodall aided the principal librarian Thomas Ruddiman in the compilation of the catalogue of the Advocates' Library, printed in 1742.

In 1753, Goodall edited a new issue of the garbled Memoirs of the Affairs of Scotland, originally published by David Crawford. His interest in the partisan Memoirs was connected with the favourable representation they contained of the career of Queen Mary. He planned to write her life, and published in 1754, in two volumes, an Examination of the Letters said to be written by Mary Queen of Scots to James, Earl of Bothwell. This work presaged the apologist period of the literature relating to the queen.

In 1754 also, Goodall published an edition, with emendations, of John Scot's Staggering State of Scots Statesmen, and an edition of James Balfour's Practicks, with preface and life. He assisted Robert Keith in the preparation of his New Catalogue of Scottish Bishops, for which he supplied the preliminary account of the Culdees. He denied that the Scotia of the early writers was Ireland (not Scotland), and that those first termed Scoti were really emigrants from Ireland; he affirmed that Ireland's other ancient name Ierne belonged also to Scotland. The glacialis Ierne, which, according to Claudian, wept for her slain Scots, was in his opinion the valley of Strathearn, the seat of an ancient Celtic earldom.

Goodall published in 1759 an edition of Fordun's Scotichronicon, with a Latin introduction on the antiquities of Scotland, and a dissertation on the marriage of Robert III. An English translation of the introduction appeared separately in 1769.

== Bibliography ==
- Goodall, Walter, An Examination of the Letters, Said to be Written by Mary, Queen of Scots, to James, Earl of Bothwell: An examination of the letters. An enquiry into the murder of King Henry, vol. 1, Edinburgh (1754)
- Goodall, Walter, An Examination of the Letters, Said to be Written by Mary, Queen of Scots, to James, Earl of Bothwell: An examination of the letters. An enquiry into the murder of King Henry, vol. 2, Edinburgh (1754), prints the casket letters in French, Latin, English.
- Examination of the Letters said to be written by Mary Queen of Scots to James, earl of Bothwell, also an enquiry into the Murder of King Henry (1754) login required.

== Notes ==
Attribution

This article incorporates text from a publication now in the public domain: Stephen, Leslie; Lee, Sidney, eds. (1890). "Goodall, Walter (1706?-1766)". Dictionary of National Biography. Vol. 22. London: Smith, Elder & Co.
