= Goídel Glas =

Medieval Irish and Scottish legendary figure

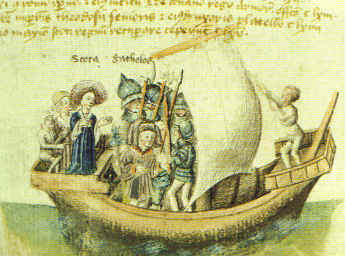
Scota (left) with Goídel Glas (right) voyaging from Egypt, as depicted in a 15th-century manuscript of the Scotichronicon of Walter Bower; in this version Scota and Goídel Glas (Latinized as Gaythelos) are wife and husband.

In medieval Irish and Scottish legend, Goídel Glas (Old Irish pronunciation: [ˈɡoːi̯ðʲel ɡlas]; Latinised as Gaithelus) is the creator of the Goidelic languages and eponymous ancestor of the Gaels. The tradition can be traced to the 11th-century Lebor Gabála Érenn. A Scottish variant is recorded by John of Fordun (d. 1384).

== Auraicept na n-Éces ==
In the Early Irish codex Auraicept na n-Éces, Goídel Glas is described as a Greek, who was one of the two sages in the company of Fénius Farsaid:

Gaedel, son of Ether, son of Toe, son of Baracham, a Greek, was one of the two sages in Fenius company, so that from him was named Gaelic, to wit, ealg means noble, to wit, Gaedel ennobled it. Gaedeal Glas also, son of Agnon or Aingin, son of Fenius father's elder brother; and he too was a sage, even he. It is he that claimed this language for Gaedel, son of Ether; wherefore Gaedealg is from Gaedel, son of Ether. And Gaedil from Gaedel, son of Agnon or Aingin. Now the Language of the Irish was invented here, and the Additional Language, and Language Parted among the trees, and the Language of the Poets is the fourth, and the Common Language that serves everyone, the fifth. Now Fenius Farsaidh son of Eugenius, and Iar son of Nema, and Gaedel son of Ether are the three sages who selected these languages, and they were invented in the city of Eotenam, or Athena.

— Auraicept na n-Éces

== Scotichronicon ==
In the 15th century chronicle Scotichronicon, Walter Bower recounts the story of Goídel Glas as a Greek prince whose father, the king, denied him any role of authority. Frustrated by this, Goídel gathered his own army and began causing widespread unrest and destruction. Eventually, his father intervened, suppressed his actions and banished him from the kingdom.

After being expelled, Goídel sailed to Egypt alongside his companions, where he aided a Pharaoh named "Chencres" in repelling an invasion by the Ethiopians. After securing a victory for Egypt, Goídel assisted the Pharaoh in maintaining control over the Israelites. As a reward, Chencres gave his daughter, Princess Scota, to Goídel in marriage.

=== Inauguration of King Alexander III ===
During the inauguration of King Alexander III of Scotland, in 1249, a Gaelic poet described a very similar origin story for Goídel Glas. The poet presented the king as a descendant of "Gaidheal Glas, son of Neolius, King of Athens and his wife Scota, daughter of a Pharaoh".

== Lebor Gabála Érenn ==
The narrative in the Lebor Gabála Érenn is a legendary account of the origin of the Gaels as the descendants of Fénius Farsaid, one of seventy-two chieftains who built the Tower of Babel. In the tale, Goídel Glas is the son of Nel (son of Fénius) and Scota (daughter of a Pharaoh of Egypt). Goídel Glas is credited with creating the Goidelic language from the original seventy-two languages that arose at the time of the confusion of tongues. His descendants, the Goidels or Gaels, undergo a series of trials and tribulations resembling those of the Israelites in the Old Testament. They flourish in Egypt at the time of Moses and leave during the Exodus; they wander the world for 440 years before eventually settling in the Iberian Peninsula. There, Goídel's descendant Breogán founds a city called Brigantia, and builds a tower from the top of which his son Íth glimpses Ireland. Brigantia likely refers to Corunna in Galicia (then known as Brigantium), whilst Breogán's tower is likely based on the Tower of Hercules, which was built at Corunna by the Romans.

An anecdote in the Lebor Gabála tells how Gaidel Glas, son of Nel (or Niul), was cured of a snakebite when Moses made fervent prayer and placed his staff on Gaidel's wound. An inserted verse in an earlier passage says of Gaidel: "green were his arms and his vesture". Michael O'Clery's redaction of the Lebor Gabála adds that the snakebite left a green ring on Gaidel from which he earned his nickname 'Glas' ("the green"). Geoffrey Keating repeats this tale, although he prefaces it with another derivation of the nickname from the word for 'lock' (Irish: glas).

Modern scholars believe that the tale is mostly an invention of medieval Irish Christian writers, who sought to link the Irish to people and events from the Old Testament. The names Goidel Glas, Scota and Fenius come from the names of the Gaels themselves, not the other way round.

== Historia Brittonum ==
The earliest surviving version of the story is found in the 9th century Historia Brittonum. It describes an unnamed nobleman from Scythia, driven from his kingdom and living with a great household in Egypt at the time of the Crossing of the Red Sea. He did not pursue the fleeing Israelites, and the Egyptians, fearful of his power now that so many of their troops had been killed, banished him. He travelled with his household across North Africa, then sailed to Iberia. They settled and lived there for around two thousand years, multiplying into a great nation, before travelling to Ireland, then Dál Riata.

== John of Fordun ==
A Scottish version of the tale of Goídel Glas and Scota was recorded by John of Fordun. This is apparently not based on the main Irish Lebor Gabála account. Fordun refers to multiple sources, and his version is taken to be an attempt to synthesise these multiple accounts into a single history.

In Fordun's version, Gaythelos, as he calls Goídel Glas, is the son of "a certain king of the countries of Greece, Neolus, or Heolaus, by name", who was exiled to Egypt and took service with the Pharaoh, marrying Pharaoh's daughter Scota. Various accounts of how Gaythelos came to be expelled from Egypt—by a revolt following the death of Pharaoh and his army in the Red Sea, pursuing Moses, or in terror from the Plagues of Egypt, or after an invasion by Ethiopians—are given, but the upshot is that Gaythelos and Scota are exiled together with Greek and Egyptian nobles, and they settle in Hispania after wandering for many years. In the Iberian Peninsula they settle in the land's northwest corner, at a place called Brigancia (the city of A Coruña, that the Romans knew as Brigantium).

Gaythelos was considered the founder of the Portuguese city of Porto by some old authors. According to them, he landed in the Iberian Peninsula in a harbor that he named "Portus Gaythelos" (later named by the Romans Portus Cale after the Callaici people), the town later giving its name to Portugal.

== See also ==
- Mythological Cycle
- Shem (Eponymous ancestor of Semites)
- Ham (Eponymonous ancestor of Hamites)
- Japheth (Eponymous ancestor of Japhetites)
- Lech, Czech, and Rus (Eponymous ancestors of Lechites, Czechs, and Rus' people)
- Angul (Eponymous ancestor of Angles)
- Asena (Eponymous ancestors of Turkic peoples)
- Romulus and Remus (Eponymous ancestors of Rome)
- Dan (Eponymous ancestor of Denmark)
- Nór (Eponymous ancestor of Norway)
- Ríg (Eponymous ancestor to Iceland)
- Table of Nations
