= Gaels =

Celtic ethnolinguistic group

Na Gaeil (Irish); Na Gàidheil (Scottish Gaelic); Ny Gaeil (Manx)
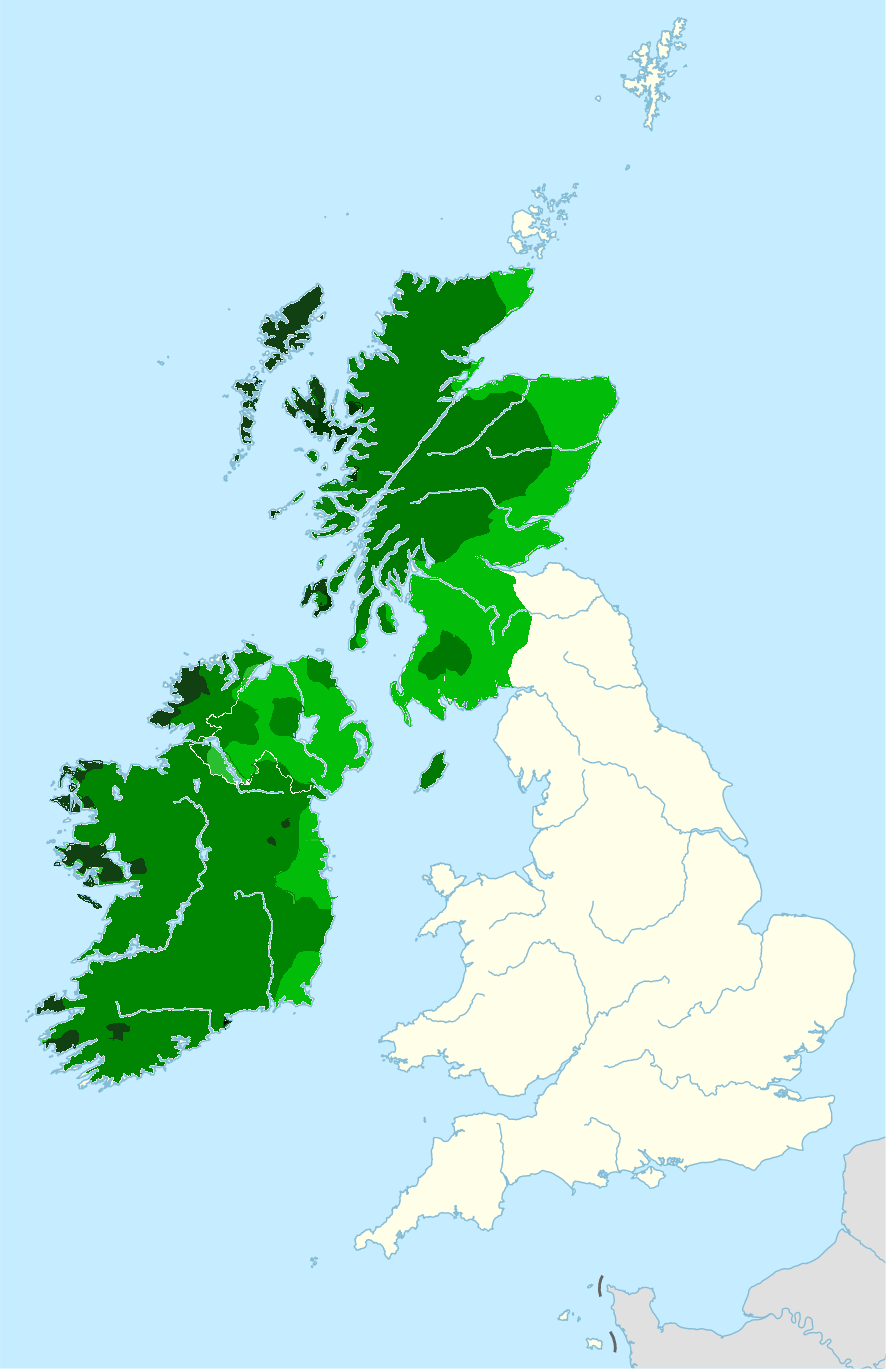
- Areas which were linguistically and culturally Gaelic c. 1000 (light green) and c. 1700 (medium green); areas that are Gaelic-speaking in the present day (dark green)

Total population
- c. 2.1 million (linguistic grouping)

Regions with significant populations
- Ireland: 1,873,997 (linguistic)
- United Kingdom: 122,518 (linguistic)
- United States: 27,475 (linguistic)
- Canada: 9,000 (linguistic)
- Australia: 2,717 (linguistic)
- New Zealand: 670 (linguistic)

Languages
- Gaelic languages (Irish · Scottish Gaelic · Manx · Shelta · Beurla Reagaird) also non-Gaelic English and Scots

Religion
- Christianity · Irreligion · (historic: paganism)

Related ethnic groups
- Norse-Gaels · Gaelicised Normans · Celtic Britons · Irish Travellers · Scottish Travellers

The Gaels (Note: /ɡeɪlz/ GAYLZ; Irish: Na Gaeil [n̪ˠə ˈɡeːlʲ]; Scottish Gaelic: Na Gàidheil [nə ˈkɛː.al]; Manx: Ny Gaeil [nə ˈɡeːl]) are a group of Insular Celtic ethnic groups native to Ireland, parts of Scotland, and the Isle of Man. They are associated with the Gaelic languages: a branch of the Celtic languages comprising Irish, Manx, and Scottish Gaelic. (Note: Origin and migration theories about the Gaelic peoples vary, as do those about the Gaels as victims of colonization and the roles of the colonists.)

Gaelic language and culture originated in Ireland, extending to Dál Riata in western Scotland. In antiquity, the Gaels traded with the Roman Empire and also raided Roman Britain. The primary Latin name for the Gaels was Scoti. In the Middle Ages, Gaelic culture became dominant throughout the rest of Scotland and the Isle of Man. There was also some Gaelic settlement in Wales, where they founded petty kingdoms, and in the Faroe Islands, where they were probably the first inhabitants. Gaelic missionaries were influential in Northumbria and the Carolingian Empire. In the Viking Age, small numbers of Vikings raided and settled in Gaelic lands, becoming the Norse-Gaels. In the 9th century, Dál Riata and Pictland merged to form the Gaelic Kingdom of Alba (Scotland). Meanwhile, Gaelic Ireland was made up of several kingdoms, with a High King often claiming lordship over them.

In the 12th century, Anglo-Normans conquered parts of Ireland, while parts of Scotland also became Normanized. However, Gaelic culture remained strong throughout Ireland, and in Scotland in the Highlands, Hebrides, and Galloway. In the early 17th century, the last Gaelic kingdoms in Ireland fell under English control. King James VI and I sought to subdue the Gaels and wipe out their culture; first in the Scottish Highlands via repressive laws such as the Statutes of Iona, and then in Ireland by colonizing Gaelic land with English and Scots-speaking Protestant settlers. In the following centuries, Gaelic language was suppressed and mostly supplanted by English. However, it continues to be the main language in Ireland's Gaeltacht and Scotland's Gàidhealtachd (Outer Hebrides and pockets of the north-west Highlands). The modern descendants of the Gaels have spread to other parts of Wales, Scotland and England, the Americas and Australasia.

Traditional Gaelic society was organised into clans, each with its own territory and king (or chief), elected through tanistry. The Irish were previously pagans who had many gods, venerated their ancestors and believed in an Otherworld. Their four yearly festivals – Samhain, Imbolc, Beltane and Lughnasa – continued to be celebrated into modern times. The Gaels have a strong oral tradition, traditionally maintained by shanachies. Inscription in the ogham alphabet began in the 4th century. The Gaels' conversion to Christianity accompanied the introduction of writing in the Roman alphabet. Irish mythology and Brehon law were preserved and recorded by medieval Irish monasteries. Gaelic monasteries were renowned centres of learning and played a key role in developing Insular art and Celtic Christianity. In the Middle Ages, most Gaels lived in roundhouses and ringforts. The Gaels long have had their own styles of dress; that in Ireland was typified for centuries by the léine croich ('saffron shirt'), and in Gaelic Scotland by the belted plaid (precursor of the modern kilt). Gaelic peoples have produced distinctive music, dances, festivals, and sports (including the Gaelic games in Ireland and Highland games in Scotland) into the modern era. Gaelic culture continues to be a major component of Irish, Scottish, and Manx society.

== Ethnonyms ==
Throughout the centuries, Gaels and Gaelic-speakers have been known by a number of names. The most consistent of these have been Gael, Irish, and Scots. In Latin, the Gaels were called Scoti, but this later came to mean only the Gaels of Scotland. Other terms, such as Milesian, are not as often used. An Old Norse name for the Gaels was Vestmenn (meaning "Westmen", due to inhabiting the Western fringes of Europe).

=== Gael ===
The word 'Gaelic' is first recorded in print in the English language in the 1770s, replacing the earlier 'Gathelik' which is attested as far back as 1596. 'Gael', defined as a 'member of the Gaelic race', is first attested in print in 1810. 'Goidelic' has also been used in English since the 19th century, but usually refers to the language group.

These names all come from the Old Irish word Goídel/Gaídel. In Early Modern Irish, it was spelled Gaoidheal (singular) and Gaoidheil/Gaoidhil (plural). In modern Irish, it is spelled Gael (singular) and Gaeil (plural). According to scholar John T. Koch, the Old Irish form of the name was borrowed from an Archaic Welsh form Guoidel, meaning 'forest people', 'wild men' or, later, 'warriors'. Guoidel is recorded as a personal name in the Book of Llandaff. The root of the name is cognate at the Proto-Celtic level with Old Irish fíad 'wild', and Féni, derived ultimately from Proto-Indo-European *weidh-n-jo-. This latter word is the origin of Fianna and Fenian.

In medieval Ireland, the bardic poets who were the cultural intelligentsia of the nation, limited the use of Gaoidheal specifically to those who claimed genealogical descent from the mythical Goídel Glas. Even the Gaelicised Normans who were born in Ireland, spoke Irish and sponsored Gaelic bardic poetry, such as Gearóid Iarla, were referred to as Gall ('foreigner') by Gofraidh Fionn Ó Dálaigh, a 14th-century Chief Ollam of Ireland.

=== Irish ===
The ethnic name Irish has existed in the English language since the 11th century, in the form Irisce, which derived from the stem of Old English Iras, 'inhabitant of Ireland', from Old Norse irar. The origin of this word is the Old Irish Ériu, which is from Old Celtic *Iveriu, likely associated with the Proto-Indo-European term *pi-wer- meaning 'fertile'. Ériu is mentioned as a goddess in the Lebor Gabála Érenn.

The ancient Greeks, in particular Ptolemy in his second-century Geographia, possibly based on earlier sources, located a group known as the Iverni (from Ancient Greek: Ιουερνοι, Iouernoi) in the south-west of Ireland. This group has been associated with the Érainn of Irish tradition by T. F. O'Rahilly and others. The Érainn included peoples such as the Corcu Loígde and Dál Riata. Ancient Roman writers, such as Caesar, Pliny, and Tacitus, derived from Ivernia the name Hibernia; although the Romans tended to call the isle Scotia, and the Gaels Scoti.

Within Ireland, the term Éireannach, 'Irish', only gained its modern political significance as a primary denominator from the 17th century onwards, as in the works of Geoffrey Keating, where a Catholic alliance between the native Gaoidheal and Seanghaill, 'old foreigners' (of Norman descent), was proposed against the Nuaghail, 'new foreigners', or Sacsanach, 'English' (the ascendant Protestant New English settlers).

=== Scots ===
The Romans began to use the term Scoti to describe the Gaels in Latin from the 4th century onward. At the time, the Gaels were raiding the west coast of Britain; it is thus conjectured that the term means "raider, pirate". The term "Scot" applied to the Gaels in general, not just those in Scotland. Examples are Johannes Scotus Eriugena and other figures from Hiberno-Latin culture, and the Schottenkloster founded by Irish Gaels in Germanic lands.

From the 5th to 10th centuries, early Scotland was home not only to the Gaels of Dál Riata but also the Picts, the Britons, Angles and lastly the Vikings.

The Gaels of northern Britain referred to themselves as Albannaich in their own tongue and their realm as the Kingdom of Alba (founded as a successor kingdom to Dál Riata and Pictland). Germanic groups tended to refer to the Gaels as Scottas and so when Anglo-Saxon influence grew at court with Duncan II, the Latin Rex Scottorum began to be used and the realm was known as Scotland. Eventually, 'Scot' and 'Scottish' came to refer to all inhabitants of Scotland, whether Gaelic or not. Germanic-speakers in Scotland began to refer to Scottish Gaelic as Erse (meaning "Irish").

== Population ==
=== Kinship groups ===
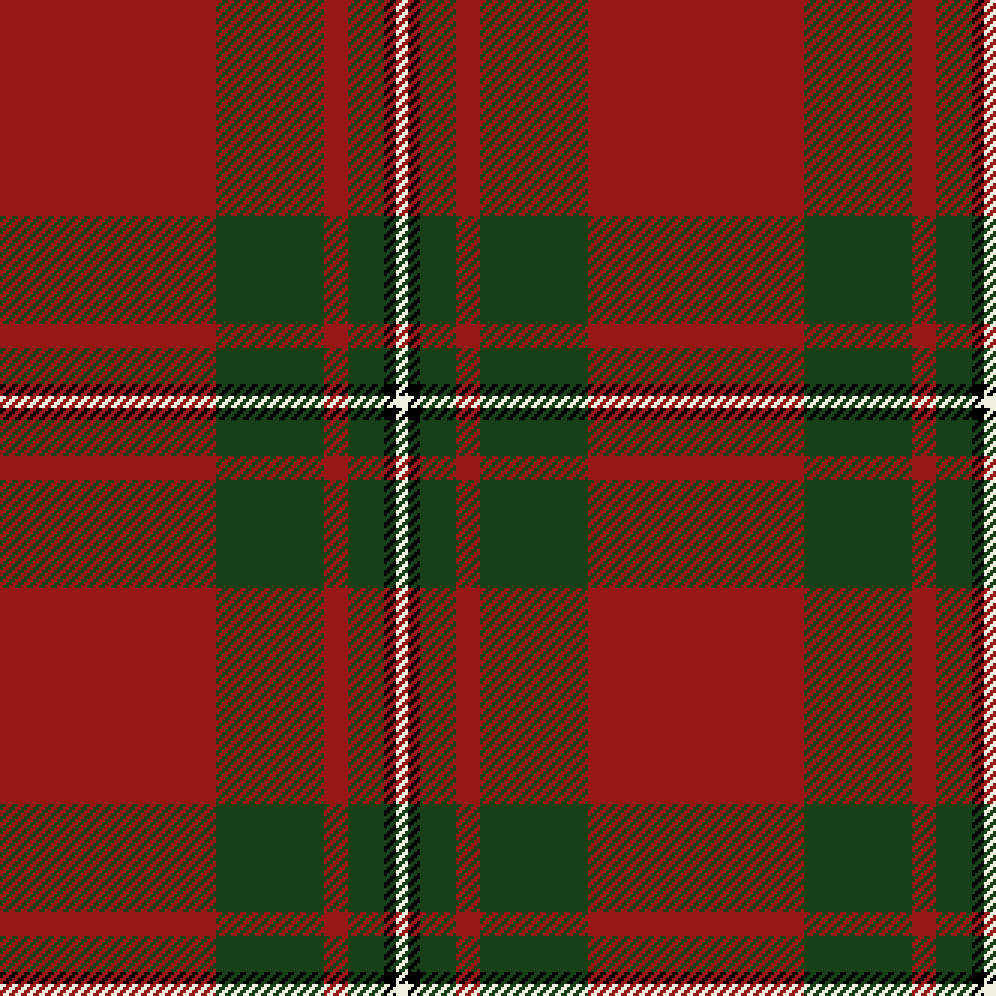
Clan tartan of the MacGregors. Distinctive patterns were adopted during the Victorian era.

In traditional Gaelic society, a patrilineal kinship group is referred to as a clann or, in Ireland, a fine. Both in technical use signify a dynastic grouping descended from a common ancestor, much larger than a personal family, which may also consist of various kindreds and septs. (Fine is not to be confused with the term fian, a 'band of roving men whose principal occupations were hunting and war, also a troop of professional fighting-men under a leader; in wider sense a company, number of persons; a warrior (late and rare)').

Using the Munster-based Eóganachta as an example, members of this clann claim patrilineal descent from Éogan Mór. It is further divided into major kindreds, such as the Eóganacht Chaisil, Glendamnach, Áine, Locha Léin and Raithlind. These kindreds themselves contain septs that have passed down as Irish Gaelic surnames, for example the Eóganacht Chaisil includes O'Callaghan, MacCarthy, O'Sullivan and others.

The Irish Gaels can be grouped into the following major historical groups; Connachta (including Uí Néill, Clan Colla, Uí Maine, etc.), Dál gCais, Eóganachta, Érainn (including Dál Riata, Dál Fiatach, etc.), Laigin and Ulaid (including Dál nAraidi). In the Highlands, the various Gaelic-originated clans tended to claim descent from one of the Irish groups, particularly those from Ulster. The Dál Riata (i.e. – MacGregor, MacDuff, MacLaren, etc.) claimed descent from Síl Conairi, for instance. Some arrivals in the High Middle Ages (i.e. – MacNeill, Buchanan, Munro, etc.) claimed to be of the Uí Néill. As part of their self-justification; taking over power from the Norse-Gael MacLeod in the Hebrides; the MacDonalds claimed to be from Clan Colla.

=== Genetics ===
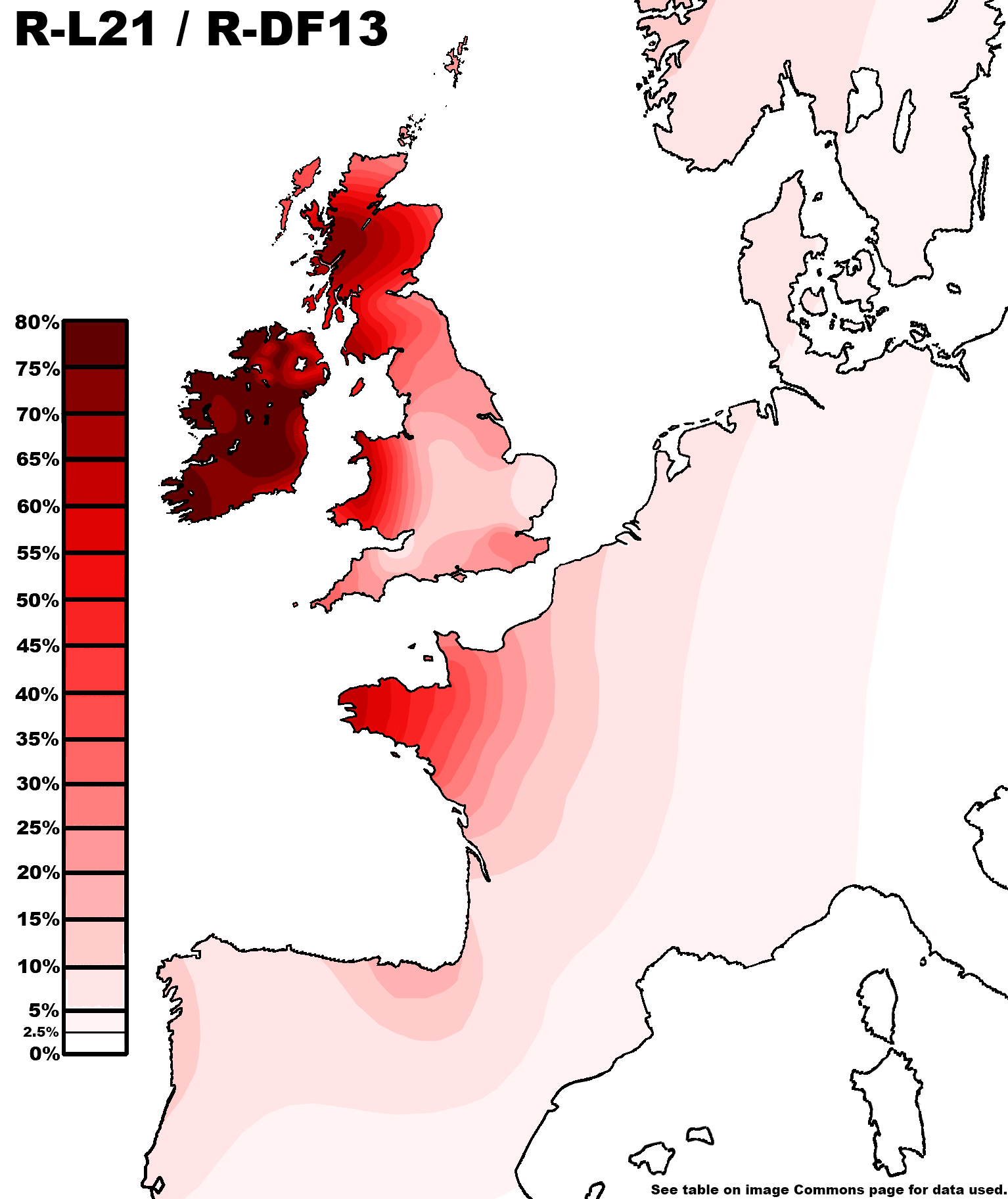
Frequency distribution of Haplogroup R-L21 in Europe

A 2009 genetic study recorded the world's highest frequencies of Haplogroup R-M269 among populations on the Atlantic fringes of northwestern Europe; including the Irish (85%), Scots, Welsh, Bretons and Basques.

R-L21, a sub-group of R-M269, is dominant among males of Gaelic ancestry, reaching a peak frequency of 94% in western Ireland. The world's highest frequencies of lactase persistence (the ability to digest milk into adulthood), and hereditary haemochromatosis, are also found among Irish people of Gaelic ancestry.

In 2016, an archaeogenetics study analyzing ancient DNA found that Bronze Age men buried on Rathlin Island between 2000–1500 BC were most genetically similar to the modern Irish, Scots and Welsh. They all belonged to Haplogroup R-L21 and had the gene for lactase persistence; one also had the gene for hereditary haemochromatosis. This shows that the genetic traits associated with the Gaels, and the Insular Celts as a whole, had emerged by 4,000 years ago. The study's authors suggested that the proto-Celtic language, ancestral to the Gaelic languages, may have arrived around this time.

Developments in genetic genealogy have allowed geneticists to link genetic subclades with specific Gaelic kindred groups (and their surnames), vindicating elements of Gaelic genealogy as found in works such as the Leabhar na nGenealach. For example, the Uí Néill (O'Neill, O'Donnell, Gallagher, etc.), are associated with R-M222 and the Dál gCais (O'Brien, McMahon, Kennedy, etc.) are associated with R-L226.

A 2017 genetic study, the "Irish DNA Atlas", shows that the Irish population can be divided into ten geographic genetic clusters; seven of Gaelic Irish ancestry, and three of shared Irish-British ancestry. The differences between the Gaelic clusters are small, and are "surprisingly faithful to the historical boundaries of Irish provinces and kingdoms". These clusters are "Ulster" in the northwest, "Connacht" in the west and midlands, "North Munster" (corresponding to historical Thomond), "South Munster" (corresponding to historical Desmond), "Leinster" (corresponding to the historical kingdom), "Central Ireland", and "Dublin". The Gaelic "Ulster" cluster shows the biggest genetic distance from Britain; this was the region that remained outside English control for the longest. The study also showed that a cluster in Argyll in western Scotland is genetically closer to the Gaelic Irish clusters than the other Scottish clusters. This area was historically Gaelic-speaking (part of the kingdom of Dál Riata).

Another genetic trait very common in Gaelic populations is red hair, with 10% of Irish and at least 13% of Scots having red hair, much larger numbers being carriers of variants of the MC1R gene, and which is possibly related to an adaptation to the cloudy conditions of the regional climate.

=== Demographics ===
In countries where Gaels live, census records documenting population statistics exist. The following chart shows the number of speakers of the Gaelic languages (Irish, Scottish Gaelic, or Manx). The question of ethnic identity is slightly more complex, but included below are those who identify as ethnic Irish, Manx or Scottish. Not all are of Gaelic descent, especially in the case of Scotland, due to the nature of the Lowlands. It also depends on the self-reported response of the individual and so is a rough guide rather than an exact science.

The two comparatively "major" Gaelic nations in the modern era are Ireland (which had 71,968 "daily" Irish speakers and 1,873,997 people claiming "some ability of Irish", as of the 2022 census) and Scotland (58,552 fluent "Gaelic speakers" and 92,400 with "some Gaelic language ability" in the 2001 census). Communities where the languages still are spoken natively are restricted largely to the west coast of each country and especially the Hebrides islands in Scotland. However, a large proportion of the Gaelic-speaking population now lives in the cities of Glasgow and Edinburgh in Scotland, and Dublin, Cork as well as Counties Donegal and Galway in Ireland. There are about 2,000 Scottish Gaelic speakers in Canada (Canadian Gaelic dialect), although many are elderly and concentrated in Nova Scotia and more specifically Cape Breton Island. According to the U.S. Census in 2000, there are more than 25,000 Irish-speakers in the United States, with the majority found in urban areas with large Irish-American communities such as Boston, New York City and Chicago.

State	Gaeilge	Ethnic Irish	Gàidhlig	Ethnic Scots	Gaelg	Ethnic Manx
Ireland	1,873,997 (2022)	3,969,319 (2011)	not recorded	not recorded	not recorded	not recorded
United Kingdom and dependencies (Note: Census data for the United Kingdom are broken down by the constituency country. White Irish was an option in the ethnicity section of the 2011 Census of the United Kingdom; this did not distinguish between those of Gaelic-Irish descent and those of Anglo-Irish descent. The results for this were: 531,087 in England and Wales; 517,907 in Northern Ireland; and 53,000 in Scotland. According to the census, 83% (or 4,399,000) of the population in Scotland identified as "Scottish" and this did not distinguish between Gaelic Highlander and Anglo Lowlander ethnicities. In the rest of the United Kingdom, the Scots were included under White British.)	64,916 (2011)	1,101,994 (2011)	57,602 (2011)	4,446,000 (2011)	1,689 (2000)	38,108 (2011)
United States	25,870 (2000)	33,348,049 (2013)	1,605 (2000)	5,310,285 (2013)	not recorded	6,955
Canada	7,500 (2011)	4,354,155 (2006)	1,500 (2011)	4,719,850 (2006)	not recorded	4,725
Australia	1,895 (2011)	2,087,800 (2011)	822 (2001)	1,876,560 (2011)	not recorded	46,000
New Zealand	not recorded	14,000 (2013)	670 (2006)	12,792 (2006)	not recorded	not recorded
Total	1,974,178	44,875,317	62,199	16,318,487	1,689	95,788

=== Diaspora ===
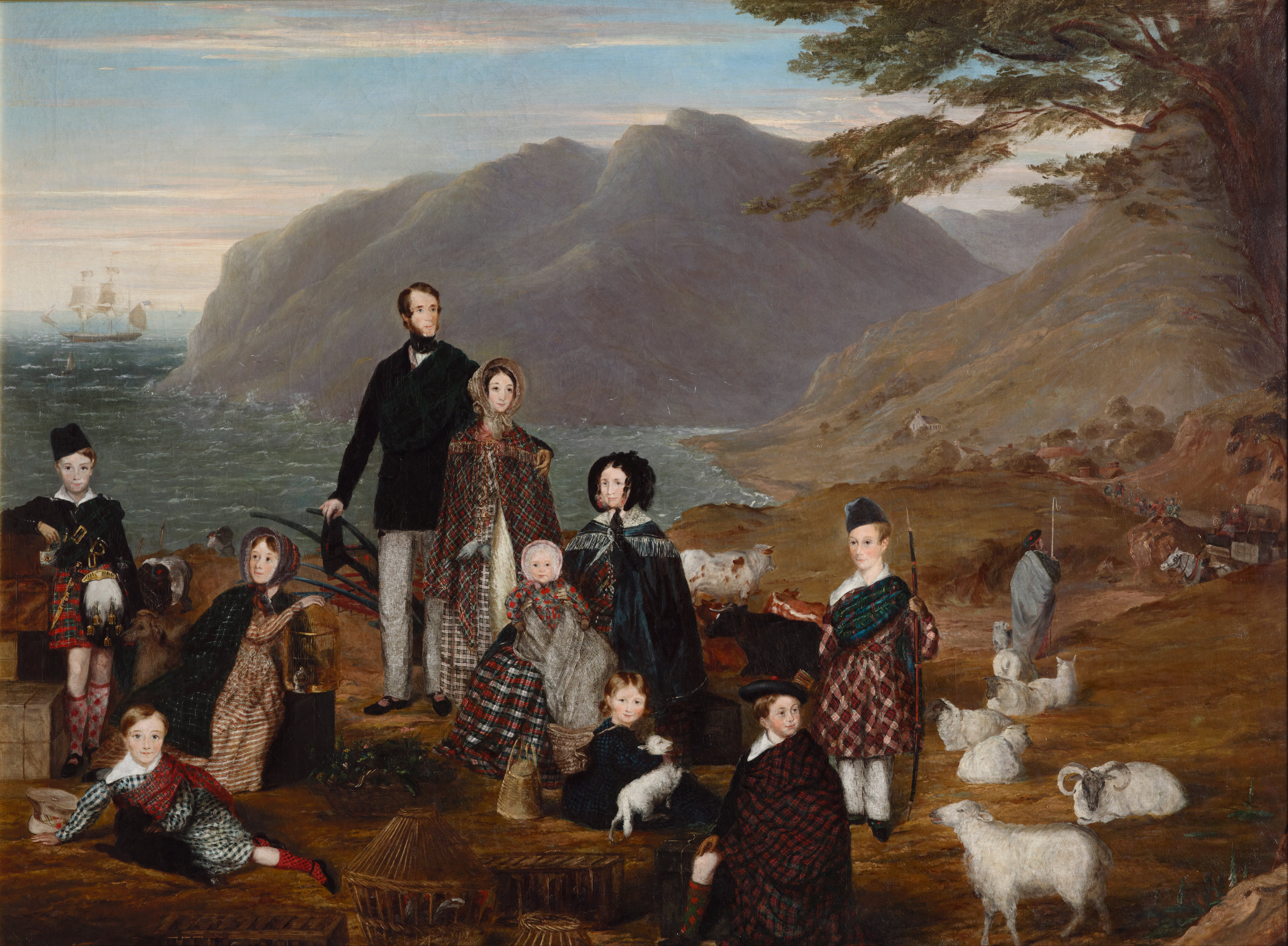
The Emigrants, painting from 1844. This depicts a Highland Scots family in Gaelic dress migrating to New Zealand.

As the Western Roman Empire began to collapse, the Irish (along with the Anglo-Saxons) were one of the peoples able to take advantage in Great Britain from the 4th century onwards. The proto-Eóganachta Uí Liatháin and the Déisi Muman of Dyfed both established colonies in today's Wales. Further to the north, the Érainn's Dál Riata colonised Argyll (eventually founding Alba) and there was a significant Gaelic influence in Northumbria and the MacAngus clan arose to the Pictish kingship by the 8th century. Gaelic Christian missionaries were also active across the Frankish Empire. With the coming of the Viking Age and their slave markets, Irish were also dispersed in this way across the realms under Viking control; as a legacy, in genetic studies, Icelanders exhibit high levels of Gaelic-derived mDNA.

Since the fall of Gaelic polities, the Gaels have made their way across parts of the world, successively under the auspices of the Spanish Empire, French Empire, and the British Empire. Their main destinations were Iberia, France, the West Indies, North America (what is today the United States and Canada) and Oceania (Australia and New Zealand). There has also been a mass "internal migration" within Ireland and Britain from the 19th century, with Irish and Scots migrating to the English-speaking industrial cities of London, Dublin, Glasgow, Liverpool, Manchester, Birmingham, Cardiff, Leeds, Edinburgh and others. Many underwent a linguistic "Anglicisation" and eventually merged with Anglo populations.

In a more narrow interpretation of the term Gaelic diaspora, it could be interpreted as referring to the Gaelic-speaking minority among the Irish, Scottish, and Manx diaspora. However, the use of the term "diaspora" in relation to the Gaelic languages (i.e., in a narrowly linguistic rather than a more broadly cultural context) is arguably not appropriate, as it may suggest that Gaelic speakers and people interested in Gaelic necessarily have Gaelic ancestry, or that people with such ancestry naturally have an interest or fluency in their ancestral language. Research shows that this assumption is inaccurate.

== Origins ==
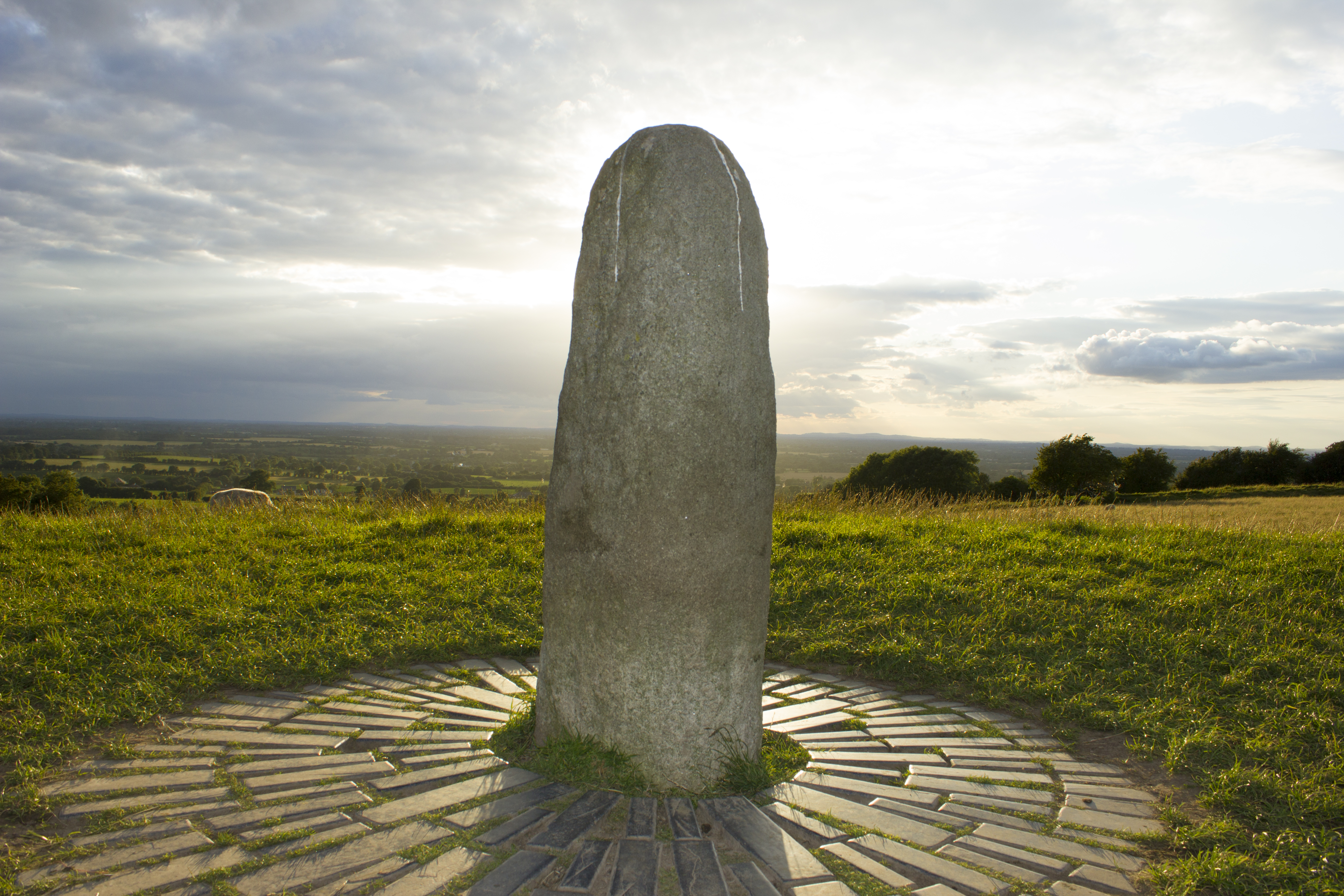
The Lia Fáil at the Hill of Tara, sacred site of inauguration for the Gaelic High Kings.

Gaelic culture and the Goidelic language are first recorded in Ireland, suggesting that it first developed on the island. There is disagreement about when Ireland and Britain became Celtic. Some scholars link it to the arrival of the Bell Beaker culture in the Bronze Age, from c.2400 BC onward. This saw the arrival of people with Steppe/Yamnaya ancestry, which eventually became dominant. Archaeologist J. P. Mallory writes that the arrival of Bell Beaker culture and spread of Bell Beaker genes seems to offer "a simple and clear model" of Irish Gaelic origins, as there is no evidence of later large migrations to Ireland, archaeologically or genetically. An archaeogenetics study found that three Bronze Age men buried on Rathlin Island between 2000 and 1500 BC were most genetically similar to the modern Irish, Scots and Welsh.

Other scholars suggest that Ireland became Celtic or Goidelic much later. Linguist Peter Schrijver argues that any date before 1000 BC is too early, because the earliest Goidelic inscriptions show that it was still very similar to other Celtic languages in the 1st century AD. Schrijver says that the various Celtic language branches should have been far more divergent after two thousand years.

Mallory proposes there was a language shift sometime after 1400 BC: that Goidelic was at first spoken by a minority (perhaps a certain class), and Ireland's pre-Goidelic people gradually switched to it because it was more advantageous (easier access to goods, status, power, security etc). He suggests two "archaeological horizons" where a language shift could have happened. The first is 1400–900 BC, when many hillforts were built. Mallory suggests that a 'hillfort language' would be a likely candidate for proto-Goidelic. These were hubs that probably had a range of functions, which could have fostered bilingualism and language shift. The second horizon is during the first few centuries BC, when a series of 'royal' ceremonial sites took shape (Emain Macha, Dún Ailinne, Rathcroghan, Tara) and other large enclosures and liner earthworks were built (Dorsey, Lismullin). Each of these 'royal' sites were later associated with a Gaelic tribe. The most important was Tara, where the High King (also known as the King of Tara) was inaugurated on the Lia Fáil (Stone of Destiny), which stands to this day.

John T. Koch proposes that Goidelic developed from proto-Celtic when Ireland went through a period of relative isolation at the end of the Bronze Age and beginning of the Iron Age, from c.600 BC. He believes Ireland and Celtiberia preserved a more conservative Q-Celtic language because they were not fully integrated into La Tène culture. This emerged around 450 BC and was associated with the newer P-Celtic (Gallo-Brittonic) languages. The Goidelic branch of Celtic retains more archaic features than Brittonic, suggesting that Goidelic is the older branch.

T. F. O'Rahilly suggested that Ireland's people had spoken a Brittonic (Brythonic) language before being conquered by Goidelic-speaking Gaels late in the Iron Age, around 100 BC. This theory has since been rejected. There is no evidence of such an invasion, nor of large migrations to Ireland after the Bronze Age. The intrusive (non-native) artifacts from this period are La Tène and Romano-British, which came to Ireland from Gallo-Brittonic regions. The Celtic name Iverni is at least as old as the 4th century BC, and evidence strongly suggests the Iverni, who became the Érainn, were the ethnolinguistic ancestors of the Gaels. The oldest direct evidence of Goidelic are ogham inscriptions from Ireland in Archaic Irish; these are thickest in Iverni territory.

=== Origin legends ===
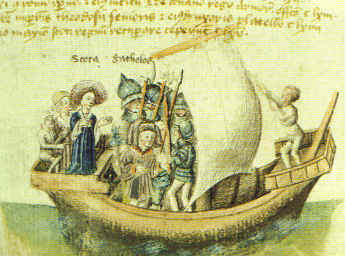
Scota and Goídel Glas voyaging from Egypt. From the 15th century chronicle the Scotichronicon.

In their own national epic contained within medieval works such as the Lebor Gabála Érenn, the Gaels trace the origin of their people to an eponymous ancestor named Goídel Glas. He is described as a Scythian prince (the grandson of Fénius Farsaid), who is credited with creating the Gaelic languages. Goídel's mother is called Scota, described as an Egyptian princess. The Gaels are depicted as wandering from place to place for hundreds of years; they spend time in Egypt, Crete, Scythia, the Caspian Sea and Getulia, before arriving in Iberia, where their king, Breogán, is said to have founded Galicia.

The Gaels are then said to have sailed to Ireland via Galicia in the form of the Milesians, sons of Míl Espáine. The Gaels fight a battle of sorcery with the Tuatha Dé Danann, the gods, who inhabited the land at the time. Ériu, a goddess of the land, promises the Gaels that land shall be theirs so long as they pay tribute to her. They agree, and their bard Amergin recites an incantation known as the Song of Amergin. The two groups agree to divide the land between them: the Gaels take the world above, while the Tuath Dé Danann take the world below (i.e. the Otherworld). The Gaels call the land Éire, which is later anglicised as 'Ireland'.

== History ==
=== Antiquity ===
According to medieval Irish legend, High King Túathal Techtmar was exiled to Roman Britain before returning to claim Tara. Based on the accounts of Tacitus, some modern historians associate him with an "Irish prince" said to have been entertained by Agricola, Governor of Britain, and speculate at Roman sponsorship. His grandson, Conn Cétchathach, is the ancestor of the Connachta who would dominate the Irish Middle Ages. They gained control of what would now be named Connacht. Their close relatives the Érainn (both groups descend from Óengus Tuirmech Temrach) and the Ulaid would later lose out to them in Ulster, as the descendants of the Three Collas in Airgíalla and Niall Noígíallach in Ailech extended their hegemony.

The Gaels emerged into the clear historical record during the classical era, with ogham inscriptions and quite detailed references in Greco-Roman ethnography (most notably by Ptolemy). The Roman Empire conquered most of Britain in the 1st century, but did not conquer Ireland or the far north of Britain. The Gaels had relations with the Roman world, mostly through trade. Roman jewellery and coins have been found at several Irish royal sites, for example. Gaels, known to the Romans as Scoti, also carried out raids on Roman Britain, together with the Picts. These raids increased in the 4th century, as Roman rule in Britain began to collapse. This era was also marked by a Gaelic presence in Britain; in what is today Wales, the Déisi founded the Kingdom of Dyfed and the Uí Liatháin founded Brycheiniog. There was also some Irish settlement in Cornwall. To the north, the Dál Riata are held to have established a territory in Argyll and the Hebrides. (Note: A minority of historical revisionists have come to challenge the traditional account of the origins of Gaelic Scotland as being derived directly from Gaelic Ireland via population movement as laid out in works such as the Senchus fer n-Alban and the Annals of Tigernach. The pioneering figure in this direction is Dr. Ewan Campbell of the University of Glasgow with his 2001 paper Were the Scots Irish?; an archaeologist, he argues that there is no evidence of mass population movement across the Irish Sea for this time period at Dunadd.)

=== Early Middle Ages ===
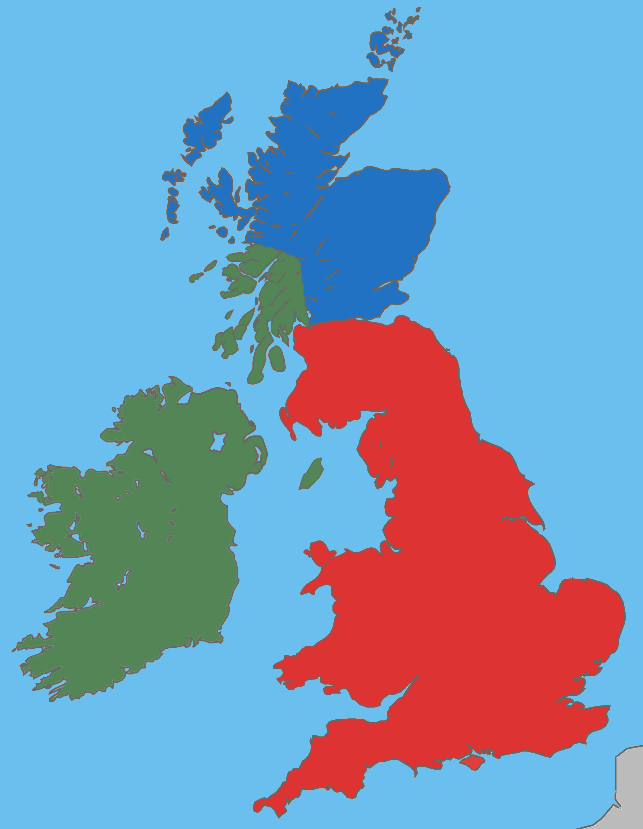
The Isles in the 5th century. Mainly Goidelic areas. Mainly Pictish areas. Mainly Brythonic areas.

Christianity reached Ireland during the 5th century, most famously through a Romano-British former slave Patrick, but also through Gaels such as Declán, Finnian and the Twelve Apostles of Ireland. The abbot and the monk eventually took over certain cultural roles of the aos dána (not least the roles of druí and seanchaí) as the oral culture of the Gaels was transmitted to script by the arrival of literacy. Thus Christianity in Ireland during this early time retained elements of Gaelic culture.

In the Middle Ages, Gaelic Ireland was divided into a hierarchy of territories ruled by a hierarchy of kings or chiefs. The smallest territory was the túath (plural: túatha), which was typically the territory of a single kin-group. Several túatha formed a mór túath (overkingdom), which was ruled by an overking. Several overkingdoms formed a cóiced (province), which was ruled by a provincial king. In the early Middle Ages the túath was the main political unit, but during the following centuries the overkings and provincial kings became ever more powerful. By the 6th century, the division of Ireland into two spheres of influence (Leath Cuinn and Leath Moga) was largely a reality. In the south, the influence of the Eóganachta based at Cashel grew further, to the detriment of Érainn clans such as the Corcu Loígde and Clann Conla. Through their vassals the Déisi (descended from Fiacha Suidhe and later known as the Dál gCais), Munster was extended north of the River Shannon, laying the foundations for Thomond. Aside from their gains in Ulster (excluding the Érainn's Ulaid), the Uí Néill's southern branch had also pushed down into Mide and Brega. By the 9th century, some of the most powerful kings were being acknowledged as High King of Ireland.

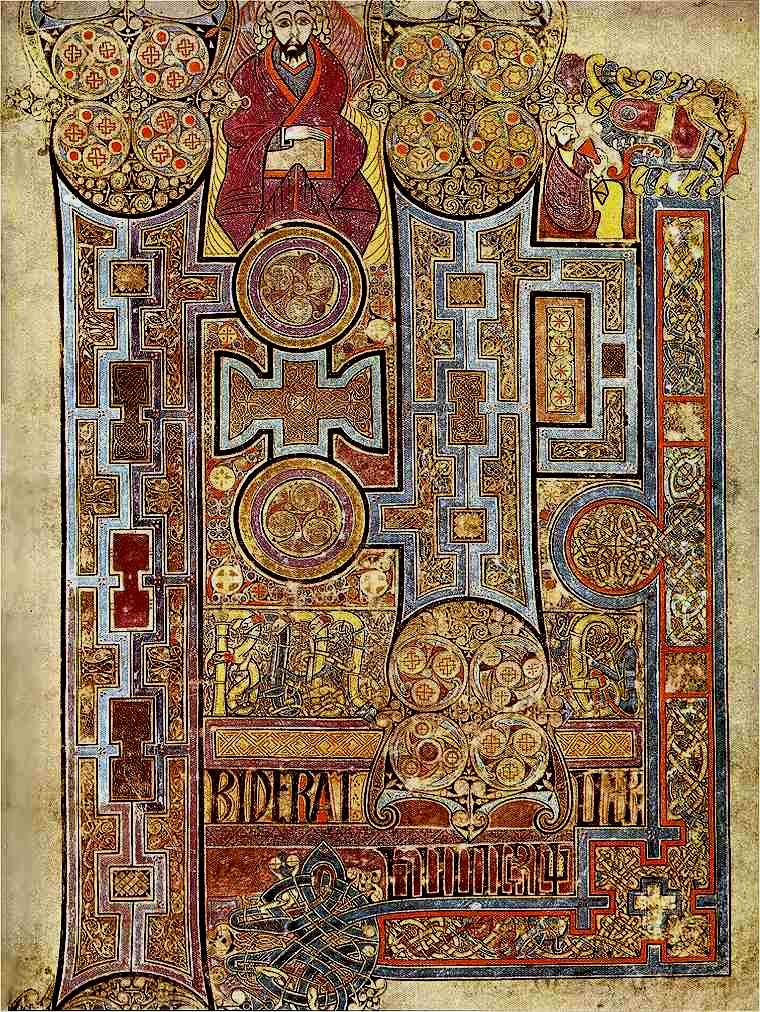
A page from the 9th century Book of Kells, one of the finest examples of Insular art. It is believed to have been made in Gaelic monasteries in Ireland and Scotland.

Some, particularly champions of Christianity, hold the 6th to 9th centuries to be a Golden Age for the Gaels. This is due to the influence which the Gaels had across Western Europe as part of their Christian missionary activities. Similar to the Desert Fathers, Gaelic monastics were known for their asceticism. Some of the most celebrated figures of this time were Columba, Aidan, Columbanus and others. Learned in Greek and Latin during an age of cultural collapse, the Gaelic scholars were able to gain a presence at the court of the Carolingian Frankish Empire; perhaps the best known example is Johannes Scotus Eriugena. Aside from their activities abroad, insular art flourished domestically, with artifacts such as the Book of Kells and Tara Brooch surviving. Clonmacnoise, Glendalough, Clonard, Durrow and Inis Cathaigh are some of the more prominent Ireland-based monasteries founded during this time.

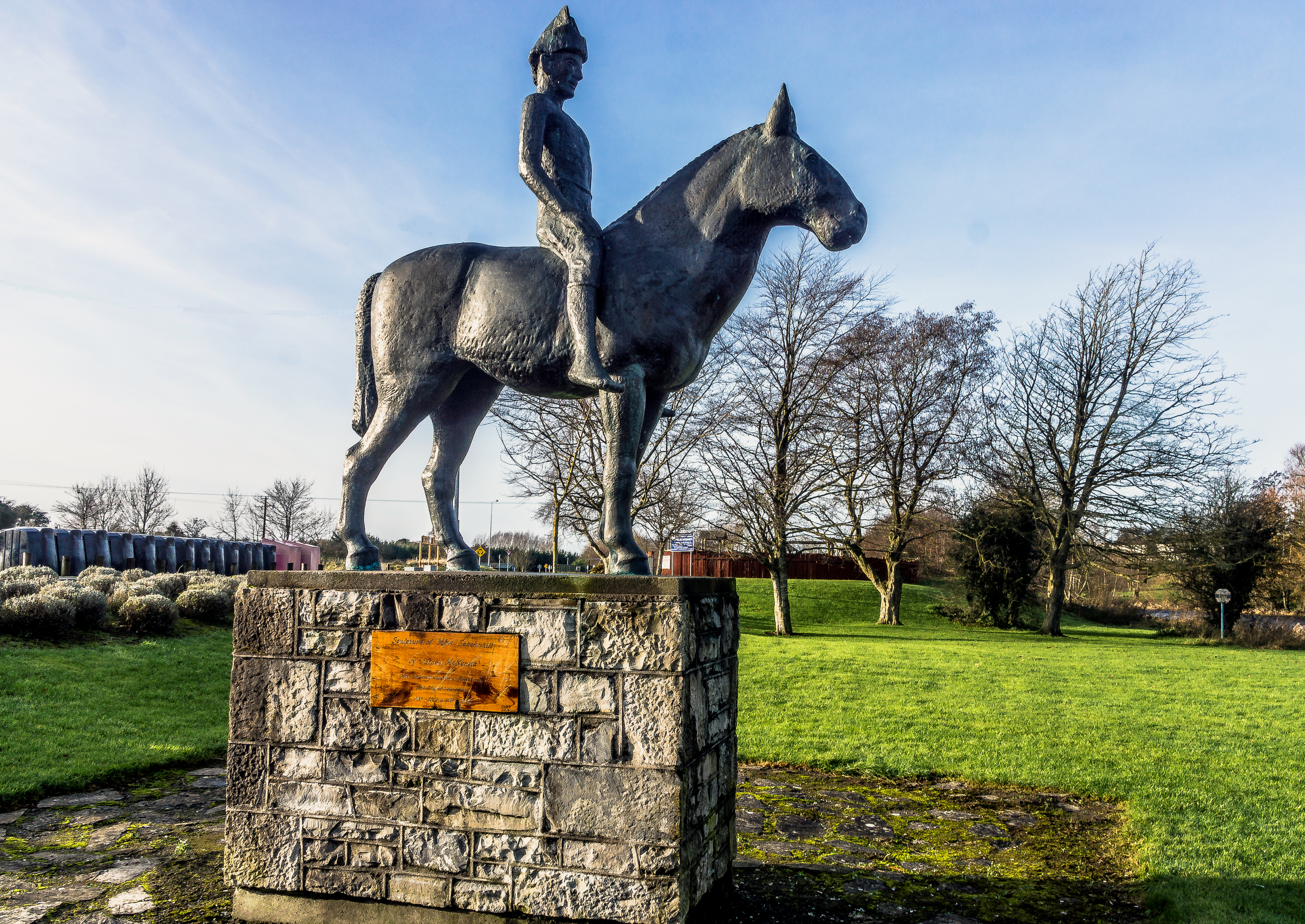
High King Máel Sechnaill mac Domnaill was one of the leaders in the struggle with the Norsemen.

There is some evidence in early Icelandic sagas such as the Íslendingabók that the Gaels may have visited the Faroe Islands and Iceland before the Norse, and that Gaelic monks known as papar (meaning father) lived there before being driven out by the incoming Norsemen.

The late 8th century heralded outside involvement in Gaelic affairs, as Norsemen from Scandinavia, known as the Vikings, began to raid and pillage settlements. The earliest recorded raids were on Rathlin and Iona in 795; these hit and run attacks continued for some time until the Norsemen began to settle in the 840s at Dublin (setting up a large slave market), Limerick, Waterford and elsewhere. The Norsemen also took most of the Hebrides and the Isle of Man from the Dál Riata clans and established the Kingdom of the Isles.

The monarchy of Pictland had kings of Gaelic origin, since the 7th century with Bruide mac Der-Ilei, around the times of the Cáin Adomnáin. However, Pictland remained a separate realm from Dál Riata, until the latter gained full hegemony during the reign of Kenneth MacAlpin from the House of Alpin, whereby Dál Riata and Pictland were merged to form the Kingdom of Alba. This meant an acceleration of Gaelicisation in the northern part of Great Britain. The Battle of Brunanburh in 937 defined the Anglo-Saxon Kingdom of England as the hegemonic force in Great Britain, over a Gaelic-Viking alliance.

After a spell when the Norsemen were driven from Dublin by Leinsterman Cerball mac Muirecáin, they returned in the reign of Niall Glúndub, heralding a second Viking period. The Dublin Norse—some of them, such as Uí Ímair king Ragnall ua Ímair now partly Gaelicised as the Norse-Gaels—were a serious regional power, with territories across Northumbria and York. At the same time, the Uí Néill branches were involved in an internal power struggle for hegemony between the northern or southern branches. Donnchad Donn raided Munster and took Cellachán Caisil of the Eóganachta hostage. The destabilisation led to the rise of the Dál gCais and Brian Bóruma. Through military might, Brian went about building a Gaelic Imperium under his High Kingship, even gaining the submission of Máel Sechnaill mac Domnaill. They were involved in a series of battles against the Vikings: Tara, Glenmama and Clontarf. The last of these saw Brian's death in 1014. Brian's campaign is glorified in the Cogad Gáedel re Gallaib ("The War of the Gaels with the Foreigners").

=== Later Middle Ages ===
The Irish Church became closer to Continental models with the Synod of Ráth Breasail and the arrival of the Cistercians. There was also more trade and communication with Normanised Britain and France. Between themselves, the Ó Briain and the Ó Conchobhair attempted to build a national monarchy.

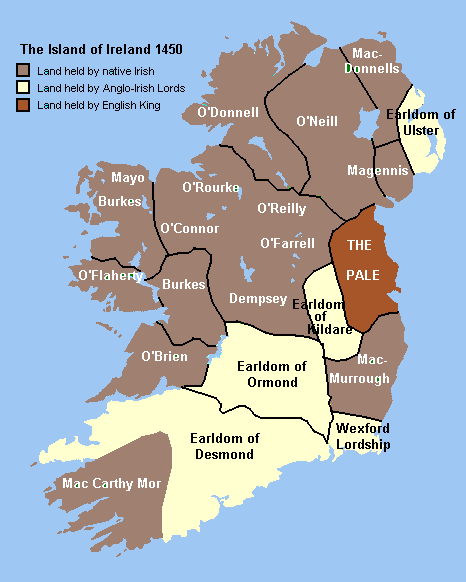
Political boundaries in Ireland in 1450, before the plantations

The remainder of the Middle Ages was marked by conflict between Gaels and Anglo-Normans. The Norman invasion of Ireland took place in stages during the late 12th century. Norman mercenaries landed in Leinster in 1169 at the request of Diarmait Mac Murchada, who sought their help in regaining his throne. By 1171 the Normans had gained control of Leinster, and King Henry II of England, with the backing of the Papacy, established the Lordship of Ireland. The Norman kings of England claimed sovereignty over this territory, leading to centuries of conflict between the Normans and the native Irish. At this time, a literary anti-Gaelic sentiment was born and developed by the likes of Gerald of Wales as part of a propaganda campaign (with a Gregorian "reform" gloss) to justify taking Gaelic lands. Scotland also came under Anglo-Norman influence in the 12th century. The Davidian Revolution saw the Normanisation of Scotland's monarchy, government and church; the founding of burghs, which became mainly English-speaking; and the royally-sponsored immigration of Norman aristocrats. This Normanisation was mainly limited to the Scottish Lowlands. In Ireland, the Normans carved out their own semi-independent lordships, but many Gaelic Irish kingdoms remained outside Norman control and gallowglass warriors were brought in from the Highlands to fight for various Irish kings.

In 1315, a Scottish army landed in Ireland as part of Scotland's war against England. It was led by Edward Bruce, brother of Scottish king Robert the Bruce. Despite his own Norman ancestry, Edward urged the Irish to ally with the Scots by invoking a shared Gaelic ancestry and culture, and most of the northern kings acknowledged him as High King of Ireland. However, the campaign ended three years later with Edward's defeat and death in the Battle of Faughart.

A Gaelic Irish resurgence began in the mid-14th century: English royal control shrank to an area known as the Pale and, outside this, many Norman lords adopted Gaelic culture, becoming culturally Gaelicised. The English government tried to prevent this through the Statutes of Kilkenny (1366), which forbade English settlers from adopting Gaelic culture, but the results were mixed and particularly in the West, some Normans became Gaelicised.

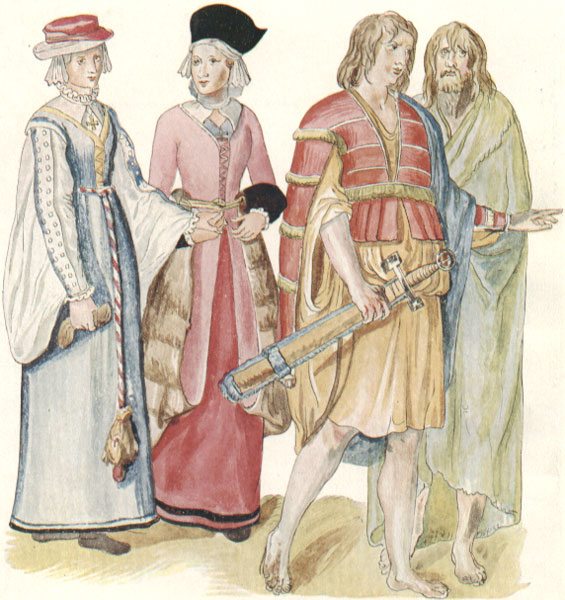
Gaelic Irish men and noblewomen, c.1575

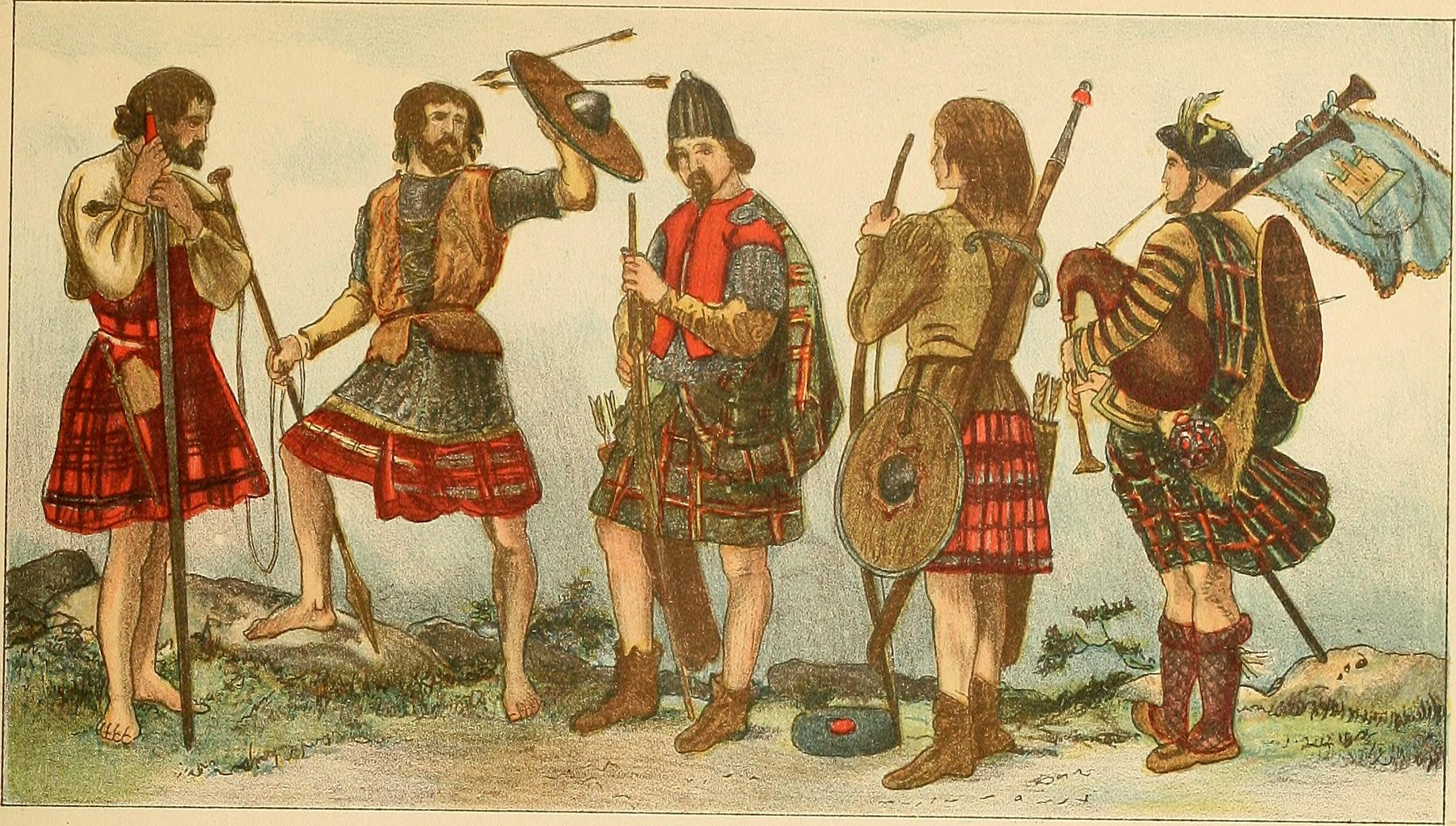
Scottish Highlanders depicted in R. R. McIan's Clans of The Scottish Highlands (1845)

=== Imperial era ===
During the 16th and 17th centuries, the Gaels were affected by the policies of the Tudors and the Stewarts who sought to anglicise the population and bring both Ireland and the Highlands under stronger centralised control, as part of what would become the British Empire. In 1542, Henry VIII of England declared the Lordship of Ireland a Kingdom and himself King of Ireland. The new English, whose power lay in the Pale of Dublin, then began to conquer the island. Gaelic kings were encouraged to apply for a surrender and regrant: to surrender their lands to the king, and then have them regranted as freeholds. Those who surrendered were also expected to follow English law and customs, speak English, and convert to the Protestant Anglican Church. Decades of conflict followed in the reign of Elizabeth I, culminating in the Nine Years' War (1594–1603). The war ended in defeat for the Irish Gaelic alliance and brought an end to the independence of the last Irish Gaelic kingdoms.

In 1603, with the Union of the Crowns, King James of Scotland also became king of England and Ireland. James saw the Gaels as a barbarous and rebellious people in need of civilising, and believed that Gaelic culture should be wiped out. Also, while most of Britain had converted to Protestantism, most Gaels had held on to Catholicism. When the leaders of the Irish Gaelic alliance fled Ireland in 1607, their lands were confiscated. James set about colonising this land with English-speaking Protestant settlers from Britain, in what became known as the Plantation of Ulster. It was meant to establish a loyal British Protestant colony in Ireland's most rebellious region and to sever Gaelic Ulster's links with Gaelic Scotland. In Scotland, James attempted to subdue the Gaelic clans and suppress their culture through laws such as the Statutes of Iona. He also attempted to colonise the Isle of Lewis with settlers from the Lowlands.

Since then, the Gaelic language has gradually diminished in most of Ireland and Scotland. The 19th century was the turning point as The Great Hunger in Ireland, and across the Irish Sea the Highland Clearances, caused mass emigration (leading to Anglicisation, but also a large diaspora). The language was rolled back to the Gaelic strongholds of the north west of Scotland, the west of Ireland and Cape Breton Island in Nova Scotia.

=== Modern era ===
The Gaelic revival also occurred in the 19th century, with organisations such as Conradh na Gaeilge and An Comunn Gàidhealach attempting to restore the prestige of Gaelic culture and the socio-communal hegemony of the Gaelic languages. Many of the participants in the Irish Revolution of 1912–1923 were inspired by these ideals and so when a sovereign state was formed (the Irish Free State), post-colonial enthusiasm for the re-Gaelicisation of Ireland was high and promoted through public education. Results were very mixed however and the Gaeltacht where native speakers lived continued to retract. In the 1960s and 70s, pressure from groups such as Misneach (supported by Máirtín Ó Cadhain), the Gluaiseacht Chearta Siabhialta na Gaeltachta and others; particularly in Connemara; paved the way for the creation of development agencies such as Údarás na Gaeltachta and state media (television and radio) in Irish.

The last native speaker of Manx died in the 1970s, though use of the Manx language never fully ceased. There is now a resurgent language movement and Manx is once again taught in all schools as a second language and in some as a first language.

== Culture ==
Gaelic society was traditionally made up of kin groups known as clans, each with its own territory and headed by a male chieftain. Succession to the chieftainship or kingship was through tanistry. When a man became chieftain or king, a relative was elected to be his deputy or 'tanist' (tánaiste). When the chieftain or king died, his tanist would automatically succeed him. The tanist had to share the same great-grandfather as his predecessor (i.e. was of the same derbfhine) and he was elected by freemen who also shared the same great-grandfather. Gaelic law is known as the Fénechas or Brehon law. The Gaels have always had a strong oral tradition, maintained by shanachies. In the ancient and medieval era, most Gaels lived in roundhouses and ringforts. The Gaels had their own style of dress, which became the modern belted plaid and kilt in Scotland. They also have their own extensive Gaelic literature, style of music and dances (Irish dancing and Highland dancing), social gatherings (Feis and Ceilidh), and their own sports (Gaelic games and Highland games).

=== Language ===
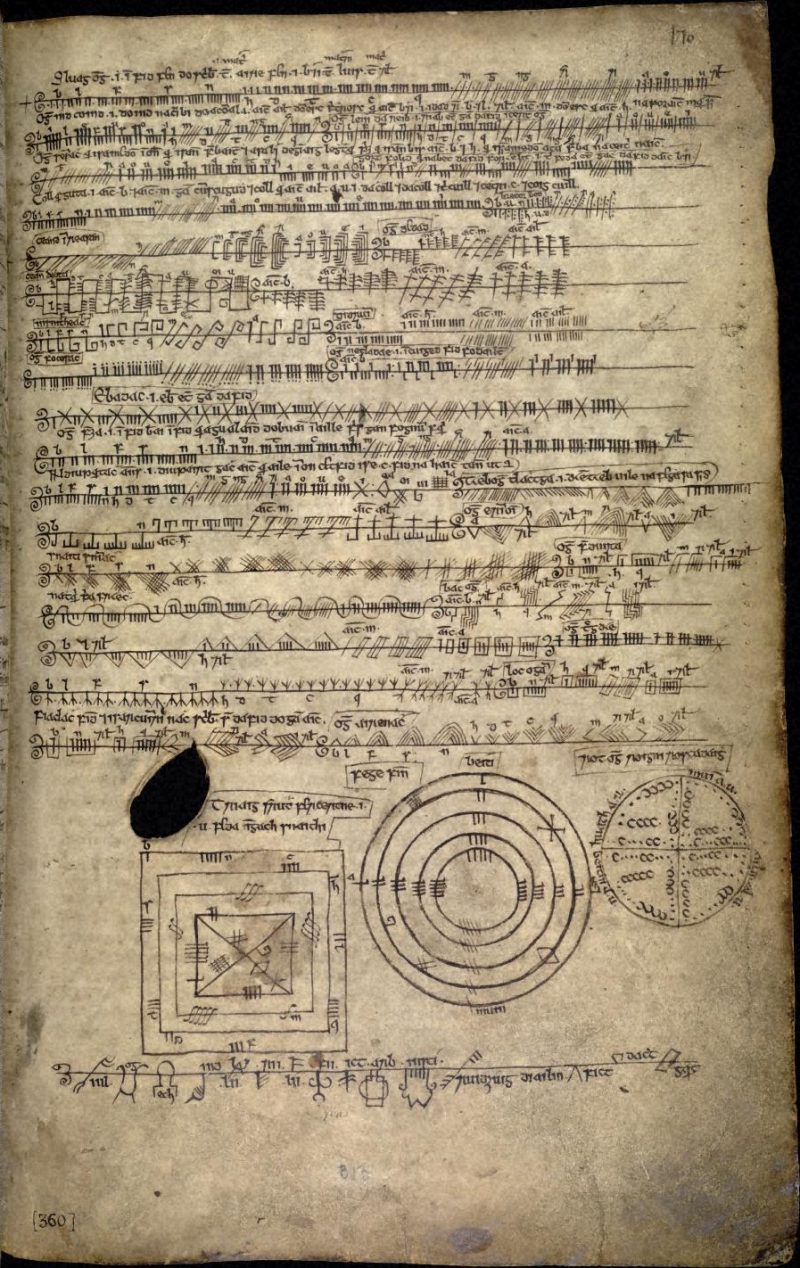
Auraicept na n-Éces, 7th century, explaining ogham.

The Goidelic (or Gaelic) languages are a branch of the Celtic languages, descending from proto-Celtic.

Respondents who stated they could speak Irish Gaelic (left) and Scottish Gaelic (right) in their respective 2011 censuses.

The Gaelic languages have been in steep decline since the beginning of the 19th century, when they were majority languages of Ireland and the Scottish Highlands; today they are endangered languages. As far back as the Statutes of Kilkenny in 1366, the English government had dissuaded use of Gaelic for political reasons. The Statutes of Iona in 1609 and the Society in Scotland for Propagating Christian Knowledge in the Highlands (for most of its history) are also notable examples. As the old Gaelic aristocracy was displaced or assimilated, the language lost its prestige and became primarily a peasant language, rather than one of education and government. The spread of the English language has resulted in a vast majority of people of Gaelic ancestry being unable to speak a Goidelic language.

During the 19th century, a number of Gaeilgeoir organisations were founded to promote a broad cultural and linguistic revival. Conradh na Gaeilge (English: the Gaelic League) was set up in 1893 and had its origins in Charles Owen O'Conor's Gaelic Union, itself a derivative of the Society for the Preservation of the Irish Language. Similar Highland Gaelic groups existed, such as An Comunn Gàidhealach. At this time, Irish Gaelic was widely spoken along the Western seaboard (and a few other enclaves) and the Gaelic League began defining it as the "Gaeltacht", idealised as the core of true Irish-Ireland, rather than the Anglo-dominated Dublin. Although the Gaelic League itself aimed to be apolitical, this ideal was attractive to militant republicans such as the Irish Republican Brotherhood, who formulated and led the Irish Revolution at the turn of the 20th century; a key leader, Pádraig Pearse, imagined an Ireland "Not merely Free but Gaelic as well – Not merely Gaelic but Free as well." Scottish Gaelic did not undergo as extensive of a politicisation at this juncture, as nationalists there tended to focus on the Lowland mythos of William Wallace rather than the Gàidhealtachd.

During the 1950s, the independent Irish state developed An Caighdeán Oifigiúil as a national standard for the Irish language (using elements from local dialects but leaning towards Connacht Irish), with a simplified spelling. Until 1973, school children had to pass Modern Irish to achieve a Leaving Cert and studying the subject remains obligatory. There are also Gaelscoileanna where children are taught exclusively through the medium of Irish. In the Gaeltacht itself, the language has continued to be in crisis under the pressure of globalism, but there are institutions such as Údarás na Gaeltachta and a Minister for Culture, Heritage and the Gaeltacht, as well as media outlets such as TG4 and RTÉ Raidió na Gaeltachta to support it. The last native Manx Gaelic speaker died in 1974, although there are ongoing attempts at revival. While the Gàidhealtachd has retracted in the Highlands, Scottish Gaelic has enjoyed renewed support with the Gaelic Language (Scotland) Act 2005, establishing the Bòrd na Gàidhlig under the devolved Scottish Government. This has seen the growth of Gaelic medium education. There are also media outlets such as BBC Alba and BBC Radio nan Gàidheal, although these have been criticised for excessive use of English and pandering to an English-speaking audience.

=== Religion ===
==== Pre-Christian ====
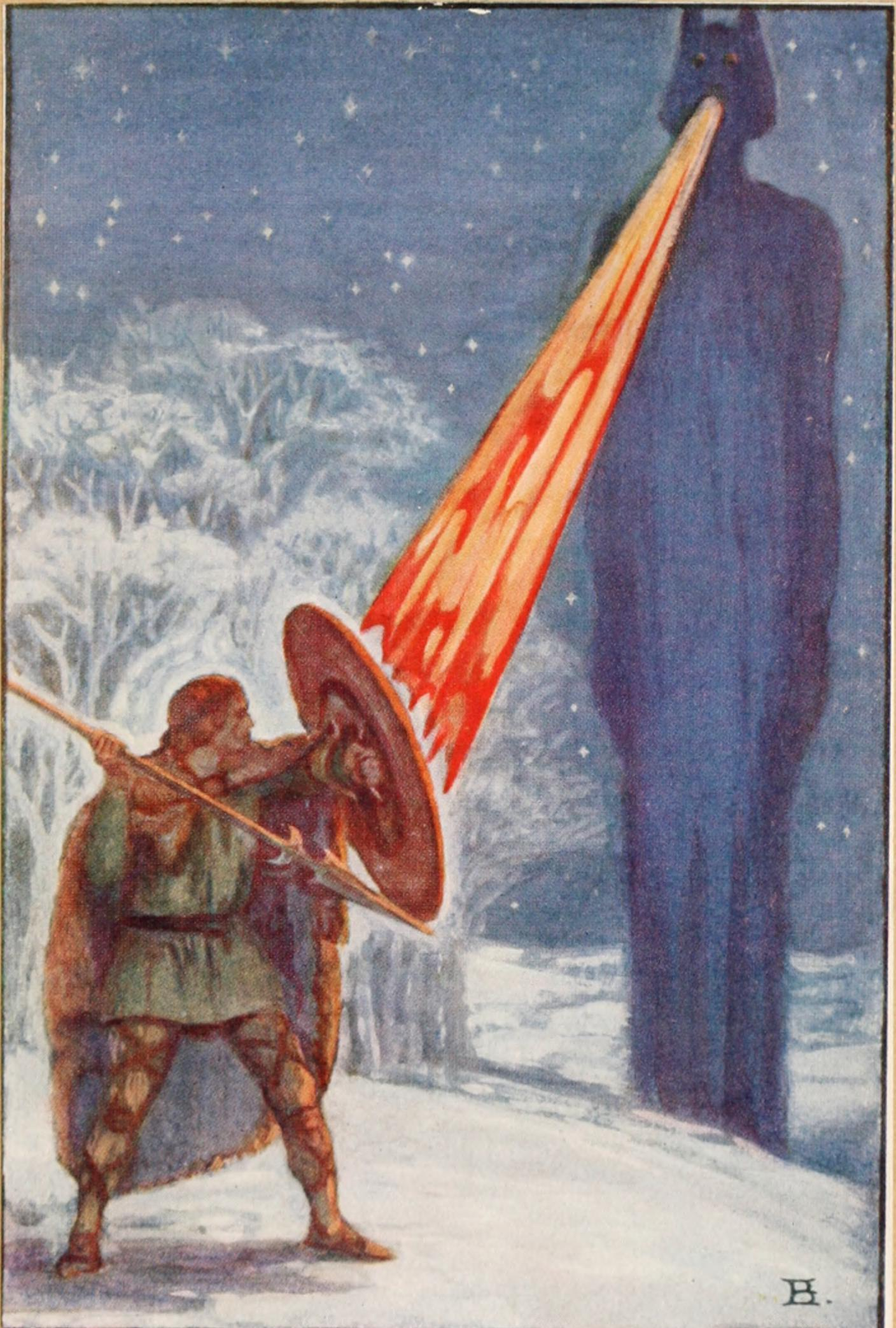
An artistic rendering of the hero Fionn mac Cumhaill

The traditional, or "pagan", worldview of the pre-Christian Gaels of Ireland is typically described as animistic, polytheistic, ancestor venerating and focused on the hero cult of archetypal Gaelic warriors such as Cú Chulainn and Fionn mac Cumhaill. The four seasonal festivals celebrated in the Gaelic calendar, still observed to this day, are Imbolc, Beltane, Lughnasadh and Samhain. While the general worldview of the Gaelic tradition has been recovered, a major issue for academic scholars is that Gaelic culture was oral prior to the coming of Christianity and monks were the first to record the beliefs of this rival worldview as a "mythology". Unlike other religions, there is no overall "holy book" systematically setting out exact rules to follow, but various works, such as the Lebor Gabála Érenn, Dindsenchas, Táin Bó Cúailnge and Acallam na Senórach, represent the metaphysical orientation of Gaelachas.

The main gods held in high regard were the Tuatha Dé Danann, the superhuman beings said to have ruled Ireland before the coming of the Milesians, known in later times as the aes sídhe. Among the gods were male and female deities such as The Dagda, Lugh, Nuada, The Morrígan, Aengus, Brigid and Áine, as well as many others. Some of them were associated with specific social functions, seasonal events and personal archetypal qualities. Some physical locations of importance in Ireland related to these stories include the Brú na Bóinne, Hill of Tara and Hill of Uisneach. Although the sídhe were held to intervene in worldly affairs sometimes, particularly battles and issues of sovereignty, the gods were held to reside in the Otherworld, also known as Mag Mell (Plain of Joy) or Tír na nÓg (Land of the Young). This realm was variously held to be located on a set of islands or underground. The Gaels believed that certain heroic persons could gain access to this spiritual realm, as recounted in the various echtra (adventure) and immram (voyage) tales.

==== Christianity ====
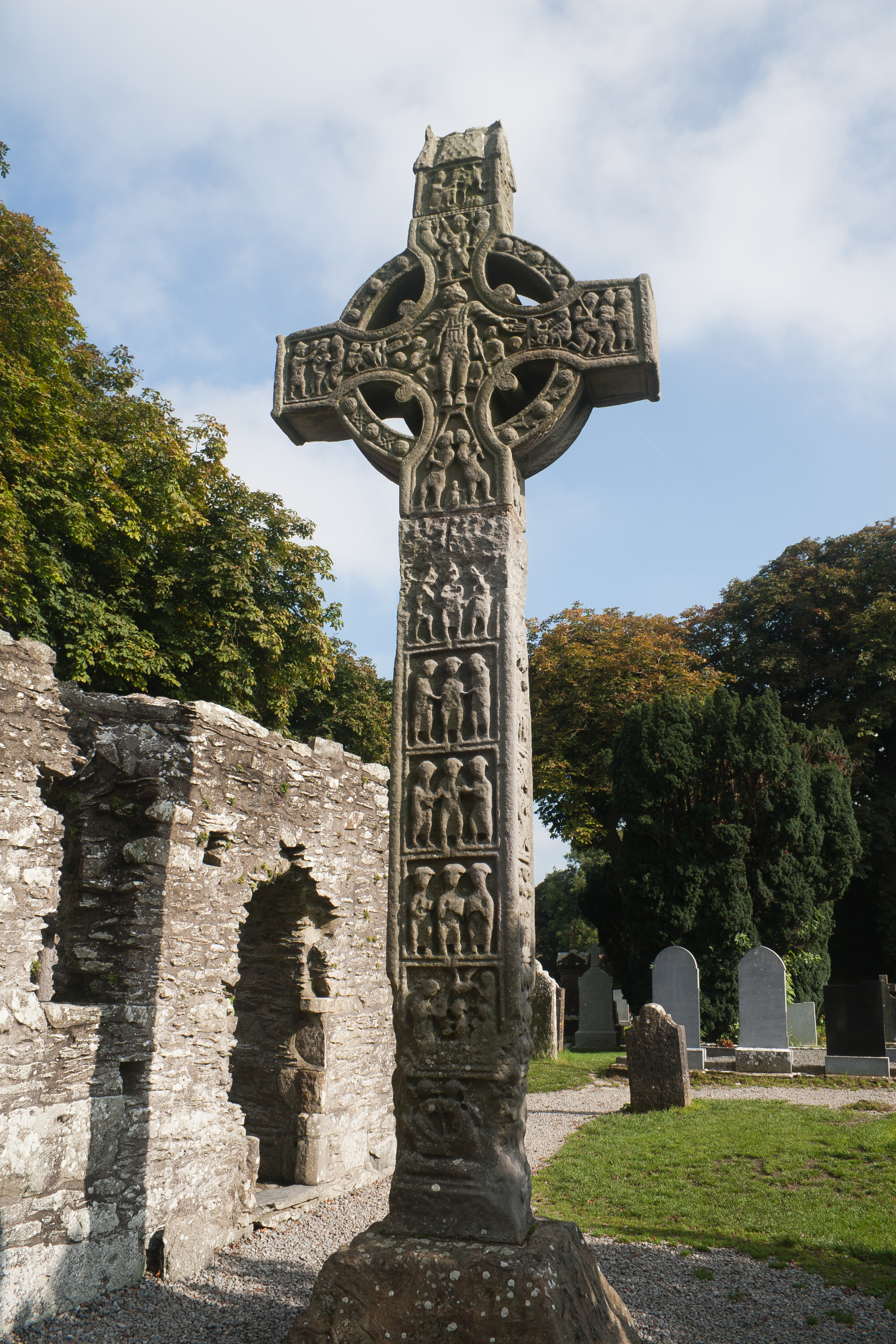
Medieval high cross at Monasterboice

The Gaels underwent Christianisation during the 5th century and that religion, de facto, remains the predominant one to this day, although irreligion is fast rising. At first the Christian Church had difficulty infiltrating Gaelic life: Ireland had never been part of the Roman Empire and was a decentralised tribal society, making patron-based mass conversion problematic. It gradually penetrated through the remnants of Roman Britain and is especially associated with the activities of Patrick, a Briton who had been a slave in Ireland. He tried to explain its doctrines by using elements of native folk tradition, so Gaelic culture itself was not completely cast aside and to some extent local Christianity was Gaelicised. The last High King inaugurated in the pagan style was Diarmait mac Cerbaill. The 6th–9th centuries are generally held to be the height of Gaelic Christianity, with numerous saints, scholars and works of devotional art.

This balance began to unravel during the 12th century with the polemics of Bernard of Clairvaux, who attacked various Gaelic customs (including polygamy and hereditary clergy) as "pagan". The Catholic Church of the time, fresh from its split with the Eastern Orthodox Church, was becoming more centralised and uniform throughout Europe with the Gregorian Reform and military reliance on Germanic peoples at the fringes of Latin Christendom, particularly the warlike Normans. As part of this, the Catholic Church actively participated in the Norman conquest of Gaelic Ireland, with the issuing of Laudabiliter (claiming to gift the King of England the title "Lord of Ireland") and in Scotland strongly encouraged king David who Normanised that country. Even within orders such as the Franciscans, ethnic tensions between Norman and Gael continued throughout the later Middle Ages, as well as competition for ecclesiastic posts.

During the 16th century, with the emergence of Protestantism and Tridentine Catholicism, a distinct Christian sectarianism made its way into Gaelic life, with societal effects carrying on down to this day. The Tudor state used the Anglican Church to bolster their power and enticed native elites into the project, without making much initial effort to convert the Irish Gaelic masses; meanwhile, the mass of Gaeldom (as well as the "Old English") became staunchly Catholic. Due to the geopolitical rivalry between Protestant Britain and Catholic France and Spain, the Catholic religion and its mostly Gaelic followers in Ireland were persecuted for a long time. In the Scottish Highlands too, the Gaels were generally slow to accept the Scottish Reformation. Efforts at persuading Highlanders in general of the value of this primarily Lowland movement were hampered by the complicated politics of the Highlands, with religious rivalries and clan antagonism becoming entwined (a prominent example was the intense rivalry, even hatred, between the generally Presbyterian Campbells and the generally Catholic MacDonalds), but most Highlanders later converted to Presbyterianism in the 19th century during the breakdown of the clan system. In a few remote areas, however, Catholicism was kept alive and even rejuvenated to some extent by Irish Franciscan missionaries, but in most of the Highlands it was replaced by Presbyterianism.

The adoption of the Free Church of Scotland (1843–1900) in the Highlands following the Disruption of 1843 was a reassertion of Gaelic identity in opposition to forces of improvement and clearance.
