= Walter Bower =

Scottish canon and chronicler (c. 1385 – 1449)

Abbot Walter Bower
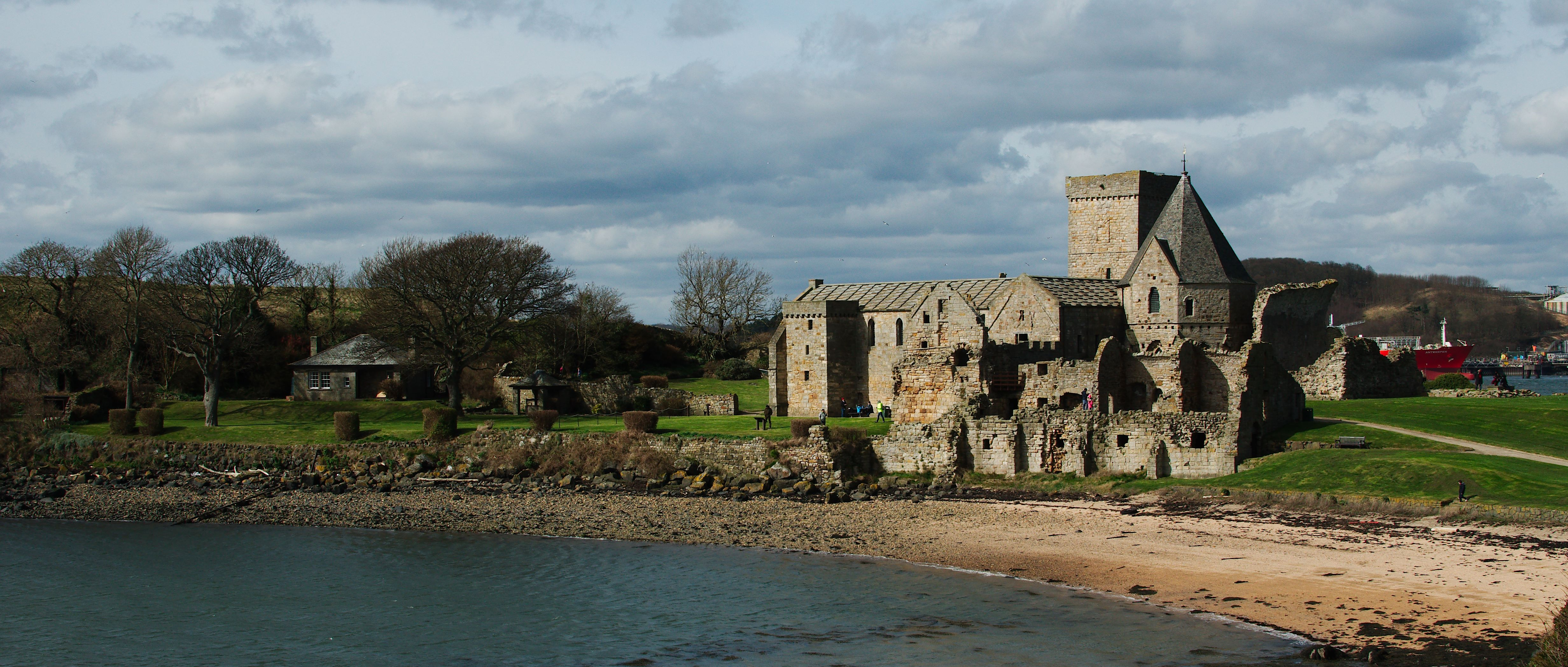
- Inchcolm Abbey

Personal details
- Born: c. 1385 Haddington, East Lothian, Scotland
- Died: 24 December 1449 (aged about 65)
- Occupation: Canon regular and chronicler

Walter Bower (or Bowmaker; c. 1385 – 24 December 1449) was a Scottish canon regular and abbot of Inchcolm Abbey in the Firth of Forth, who is noted as a chronicler of his era. He was born about 1385 at Haddington, East Lothian, in the Kingdom of Scotland. In 1991, Donald Watt said of Bower's Scotichronicon that "We are more and more convinced that this book is one of the national treasures of Scotland, which should be studied in depth for many different kinds of enquiry into Scotland's past."

== Life ==
Some sources say that, at the age of eighteen, Bower assumed the religious habit; he was trained at the University of St Andrews. After finishing his philosophical and theological studies, he visited Paris to study law. Bower was unanimously the abbot of the Augustinian community on Inchcolm in 1417. He also acted as one of the commissioners for the collection of the ransom of King James I of Scotland in 1423 and 1424. Later, in 1433, he took part in a diplomatic mission to Paris to discuss the possibility of marriage of the king's daughter to the Dauphin of France. He played an important part at the Council of Perth of 1432 in the defence of Scottish rights.

During Bower's closing years he was engaged on his work, the Scotichronicon, on which his reputation now chiefly rests. This work, undertaken in 1440 by desire of a neighbour, Sir David Stewart of Rosyth Castle, was a continuation of the Chronica Gentis Scotorum of John of Fordun. The completed work, in its original form, consisted of sixteen books, of which the first five and a portion of the sixth (to 1163) are Fordun's — or mainly his, for Bower added to them in places. In the later books, down to the reign of Robert I (1371), he was aided by Fordun's Gesta Annalia, but from that point to the close the work is original and of contemporary importance, especially for James I, with whose death it ends. The task was finished in 1447.

In the two remaining years of Bower's life he was engaged on a reduction or "abridgment" of this work, which is known as the Book of Cupar, and is preserved in the Advocates Library, Edinburgh (MS. 35. 1. 7). Other abridgments, not by Bower, were made about the same time, one about 1450 (perhaps by Patrick Russell, a Carthusian monk of Perth), also preserved in the Advocates' library (MS. 35. 6. 7) and another in 1461 by an unknown writer, preserved in the same collection (MS. 35. 5. 2). Copies of the full text of the Scotichronicon, by different scribes, still exist. There are two in the British Library, in The Black Book of Paisley, and in Harley MS 712; one in the Advocates Library, from which Walter Goodall printed his edition (Edin., 1759), and one in the library of Corpus Christi College, Cambridge.

See also W. F. Skene's edition of Fordun in the series of Historians of Scotland (1871). Personal references are to be found in the Exchequer Rolls of Scotland, iii. and iv.

A revised and updated translation of Bower's work was produced under the leadership of Professor D. E. R. Watt, in nine volumes, published between 1987 and 1997. The critical edition of Bower's Latin text in Watt et al. has been amended and corrected by Chris Nighman in light of the discovery that Bower made extensive use of Thomas of Ireland's collection of authoritative quotations, the Manipulus florum (1306).

== Bibliography ==
- Fordun, John of; Bower, Walter. Joannis de Fordun Scotichronicon, cum supplementis et continuatione Walteri Boweri. Edited by Walter Goodall. 2 vols. Edinburgh: Robert Fleming, 1759.
- Fordun, John of. Johannis de Fordun Chronica Gentis Scotorum. Edited by William Forbes Skene. 2 vols. Edinburgh: Edmonston and Douglas, 1871–1872. (Historians of Scotland series.)
- Tytler, Patrick Fraser. Lives of Scottish Worthies. 3 vols. London: Richard Bentley, 1845–1847.
- Exchequer Rolls of Scotland, ed. George Burnett, iii. and iv.
- See also Marjorie J. Drexler's list

Religious titles
Preceded by Laurence	Abbot of Inchcolm; 1417–1449	Succeeded by John Kers
