= Scotia's Grave =

- Area
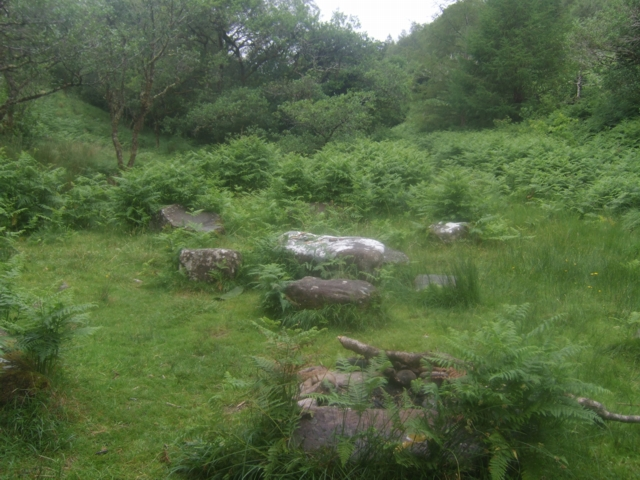

- Location in Ireland
- Coordinates: 52°13′34″N 9°42′38″W
- Country: Ireland
- Province: Munster
- County: County Kerry
- Time zone: UTC+0 (WET)
  - Summer (DST): UTC-1 (IST (WEST))
- Irish Grid Reference: Q8309

Scotia's Grave or Scota's Grave is a rock feature south of Tralee in County Kerry, Ireland. It is beside a stream called the Finglas (Fionnghlas - 'clear stream'), in a wooded glen called Gleann Scoithín, anglicized 'Glenscoheen' or 'Glanaskagheen'. According to Geoffrey Keating's Foras Feasa ar Éirinn (17th century), it is the burial place of Scota, an ancient queen of the Milesians (Gaels) who died there in battle with the Tuatha Dé Danann. John O'Mahony translated Gleann Scoithín as "vale of the little flower" and said it is the Irish equivalent of the female name Flora. According to the National Monuments Service, "Following a site inspection in 1999 it was concluded that the evidence was not sufficient to warrant accepting this as an archaeological monument".

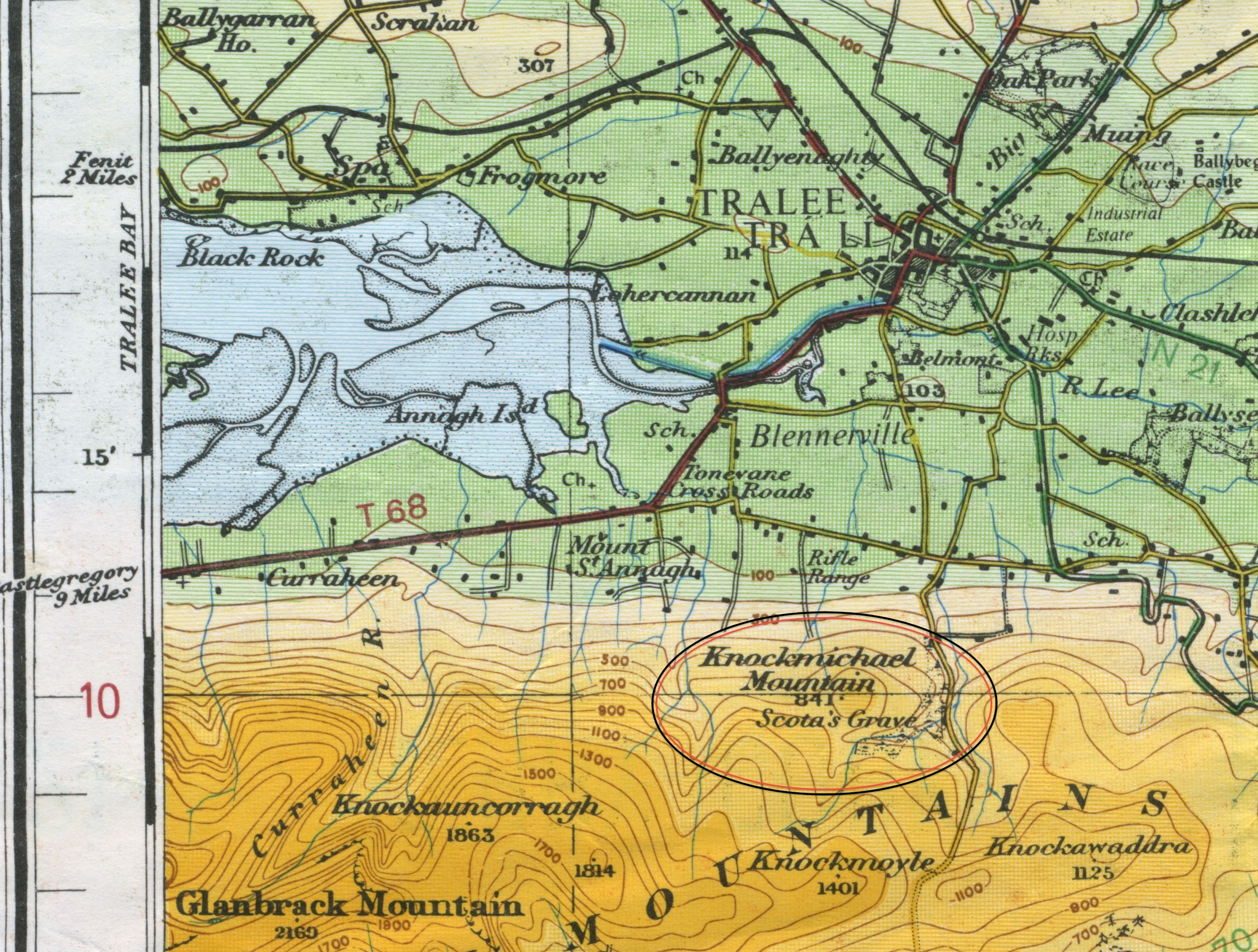
Marked extract from OSI map of 1986
