= Nel (mythology) =

Mythical figure in Celtic mythology

Nel also known as Nuil or Niul was a mythical figure from the Lebor Gabála Érenn and was an ancestor of the people of Ireland. He was the son of Fénius Farsaid, who was a legendary king of Scythia, who left Babylon after the destruction of Babel. Nel returned to Babylon as part of an effort to study the confusion of languages. He was a scholar of languages and was invited by Pharaoh Cingris to Egypt to take his daughter Scota’s hand in marriage. Also Nel was the father of Goídel Glas who was credited with creating the Goidelic languages.
