= Fénius Farsaid =

Legendary king of Scythia

Fénius Farsaid (also Phoeniusa, Phenius, Féinius; Farsa, Farsaidh, many variant spellings) is a legendary king of Scythia who appears in different versions of Irish mythology. He was the son of Boath, a son of Magog. Other sources describe his lineage from the line of Gomer. According to some traditions, he invented the Ogham alphabet and the Gaelic language.

According to recensions M and A of the Lebor Gabála Érenn, Fénius and his son Nél journeyed to the Tower of Babel (in recension B, it is Rifath Scot son of Gomer instead). Nél, who was trained in many languages, married Scota, daughter of Pharaoh Cingris of Egypt, producing their son Goidel Glas.

In the Lebor Gabála Érenn (11th century), he is said to be one of the 72 chieftains who built Nimrod's Tower of Babel, but travelled to Scythia after the tower collapsed.

According to the Auraicept na n-Éces, Fenius journeyed from Scythia together with Goídel mac Ethéoir, Íar mac Nema and a retinue of 72 scholars. They came to the plain of Shinar to study the confused languages at Nimrod's tower. Finding that the speakers had already dispersed, Fenius sent his scholars to study them, staying at the tower, coordinating the effort. After ten years, the investigations were complete, and Fenius created in Bérla tóbaide "the selected language", taking the best of each of the confused tongues, which he called Goídelc, Goidelic, after Goídel mac Ethéoir. He also created extensions, called Bérla Féne, after himself, Íarmberla, after Íar mac Nema, and others, and the Beithe-luis-nuin (the Ogham) as a perfected writing system for his languages, Béarla na bhFileadh - 'language of the poets'. The Secret Language of the Poets, Gnaith-bhearla, a common language and dialect of the illiterate majority, it later became Old and Middle Irish, and eventually Modern Irish.

The Auraicept claims that Fenius Farsaidh discovered four alphabets, the Hebrew, Greek and Latin ones, and finally the Ogham, and portrays the Ogham as the most perfected because it was discovered last.
