= Ierne =

Ierne may refer to:

- Ériu, a goddess of Ireland
- Ireland - see Éire#Etymology
