= Statutes of Iona =

Scottish laws

The Statutes of Iona, passed in Scotland in 1609, required that Highland Scottish clan chiefs send their heirs to Lowland Scotland to be educated in English-speaking Protestant schools. As a result, some clans, such as the MacDonalds of Sleat and the MacLeods of Harris, adopted the new religion. Other clans, notably the MacLeans of Morvern & Mull, MacDonalds of Clanranald, Keppoch, Glengarry, and Glencoe, remained resolutely Roman Catholic.

== Provisions ==
Among the provisions of the statutes were:

- The provision and support of Protestant ministers to Highland Parishes
- The establishment of inns "to be set up in convenient places in all the Islands for accommodation of travellers" and to end the custom of "sorning", the practice of extorting free quarters and provision
- The outlawing of beggars
- The prohibition of general import and sale of wine and whisky, except to chiefs and other gentlemen who were permitted to purchase wine and aquavitae from the Lowlands for household consumption
- The education of the children of any "gentleman or yeoman" in possession of more than sixty cattle in Lowland schools where they "may be found able sufficiently to speik, reid and wryte Englische"
- Prohibition from carrying hagbuts or pistols out of their own houses, or shooting at deer, hares, or fowls
- The outlawing of bards and other bearers of the traditional culture "pretending libertie to baird and flattir," and that all such persons should be apprehended, put in the stocks, and expelled from the Islands
- The prohibition on the protection of fugitives

In the view of some writers, these provisions were "the first of a succession of measures taken by the Scottish government specifically aimed at the extirpation of the Gaelic language, the destruction of its traditional culture and the suppression of its bearers"
