= Scotichronicon =

15th-century chronicle of Scottish history

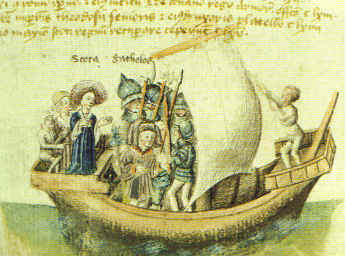
The founders of Scotland of medieval legend, Scota with Goídel Glas, voyaging from Egypt, as depicted in a 15th-century manuscript of the Scotichronicon

The Scotichronicon is a 15th-century chronicle by the Scottish historian Walter Bower. It is a continuation of historian-priest John of Fordun's earlier work Chronica Gentis Scotorum beginning with the founding of Ireland and thereby Scotland by Scota with Goídel Glas.

The chronicle consists of 16 books written in Latin. The book's composition started in 1440. It was completed in 1447. The last event covered in the chronicle is the death of James I of Scotland in 1437. The chronicle depicts Robin Hood as a historical figure. He is depicted as one of the rebels in the Second Barons' War (1264-1267).

== The work ==
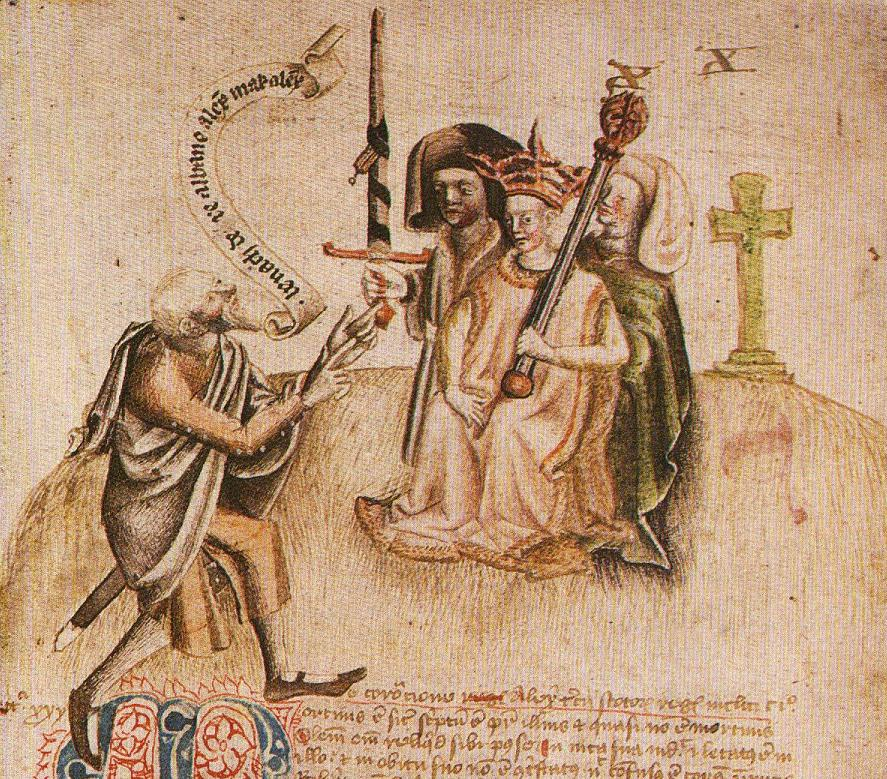
Depiction of the coronation of Alexander III on Moot Hill, Scone

Bower began the work in 1440 at the request of a neighbour, Sir David Stewart of Rosyth. The completed work, in its original form, consists of 16 books, of which the first five and a portion of the sixth (to 1163) are Fordun's, or mainly his, for Bower added to them at places. In the later books, down to the reign of Robert I (1371), he was aided by Fordun's Gesta Annalia, but from that point to the close, the work is original and of contemporary importance, especially for James I, with whose death it ends. The task was finished in 1447.

== Abridgments ==
Bower engaged in a reduction or "abridgment" of the Scotichronicon in the last two years of his life, which is known as the Book of Cupar, and which is preserved in the Advocates' library, Edinburgh (MS. 35. 1. 7). Other abridgments, not by Bower, were made about the same time, one about 1450 (perhaps by Patrick Russell, a Carthusian of Perth) preserved in the Advocates' library (MS. 35. 6. 7) and another in 1461 by an unknown writer, also preserved in the same collection (MS. 35. 5. 2). Copies of the full text of the Scotichronicon, by different scribes, are extant. There are two in the British Library, in The Black Book of Paisley, and in Harley MS 712; one in the Advocates' library, from which Walter Goodall printed his edition (Edinburgh, 1759), and one in the library of Corpus Christi College, Cambridge.

== Importance ==
The National Library of Scotland has called it "probably the most important medieval account of early Scottish history", noting that it provides both a strong expression of national identity and a window into the world view of medieval commentators.

== Robert Hood entry ==
In contrast to the 1283 entry for Robin Hood by Andrew of Wyntoun in his Orygynale Cronykil of Scotland, Bower placed Robert (Robin) Hood in 1266. By changing the date of Wyntoun's entry, Bower removed Wyntoun's association of the outlaw with the national heroes, William Wallace and Robert the Bruce, and substituted an association with the rebellion by Simon de Montfort, 6th Earl of Leicester against Henry III of England. (Note the reference to Robert Hood being one of "the disinherited", the term applied to de Montfort's followers.) Bower calls Robert Hood a 'famosus siccarius' (Latin for famous cutthroat), who nevertherless donated his ill-gotten gains to the Church and held the servants of the Church in high regard.

Then arose the famous murderer, Robert Hood, as well as Little John, together with their accomplices from among the disinherited, whom the foolish populace are so inordinately fond of celebrating both in tragedies and comedies, and about whom they are delighted to hear the jesters and minstrels sing above all other ballads. About whom also certain praiseworthy things are told, as appears in this -- that when once in Barnsdale, avoiding the anger of the king and the threats of the prince, he was according to his custom most devoutly hearing Mass and had no wish on any account to interrupt the service -- on a certain day, when he was hearing Mass, having been discovered in that very secluded place in the woods when the Mass was taking place by a certain sheriff (viscount) and servant of the king, who had very often lain in wait for him previously, there came to him those who had found this out from their men to suggest that he should make every effort to flee. This, on account of his reverence for the sacrament in which he was then devoutly involved, he completely refused to do. But, the rest of his men trembling through fear of death, Robert, trusting in the one so great whom he worshipped, with the few who then bravely remained with him, confronted his enemies and easily overcame them, and enriched by the spoils he took from them and their ransom, ever afterward singled out the servants of the church and the Masses to be held in greater respect, bearing in mind what is commonly said: "God harkens to him who hears Mass frequently."

— Walter Bower, as quoted by F. J. Child (English translation by A. I. Jones), The English and Scottish Popular Ballads, volume III, p 41. 1965. Dover Press, NY (reprint)

Bower's tale is similar to the beginning of Robin Hood and the Monk (Child 119). One of the earliest-known tales of Robin Hood, the manuscript is dated to no earlier than 1450, and is housed at Cambridge University Library (MS Ff.5.48). This Latin summary and Robin Hood and the Monk are probably as close to the rhymes of Robin Hood described by Langland in 1377 as scholars can get.

== Criticism ==
Bower has been described as a less competent chronicler than Fordun, with one commentator calling him "garrulous, irrelevant and inaccurate" and noting that he "makes every important occurrence an excuse for a long-winded moral discourse".
