= Scotia =

Latin term for Gaelic lands

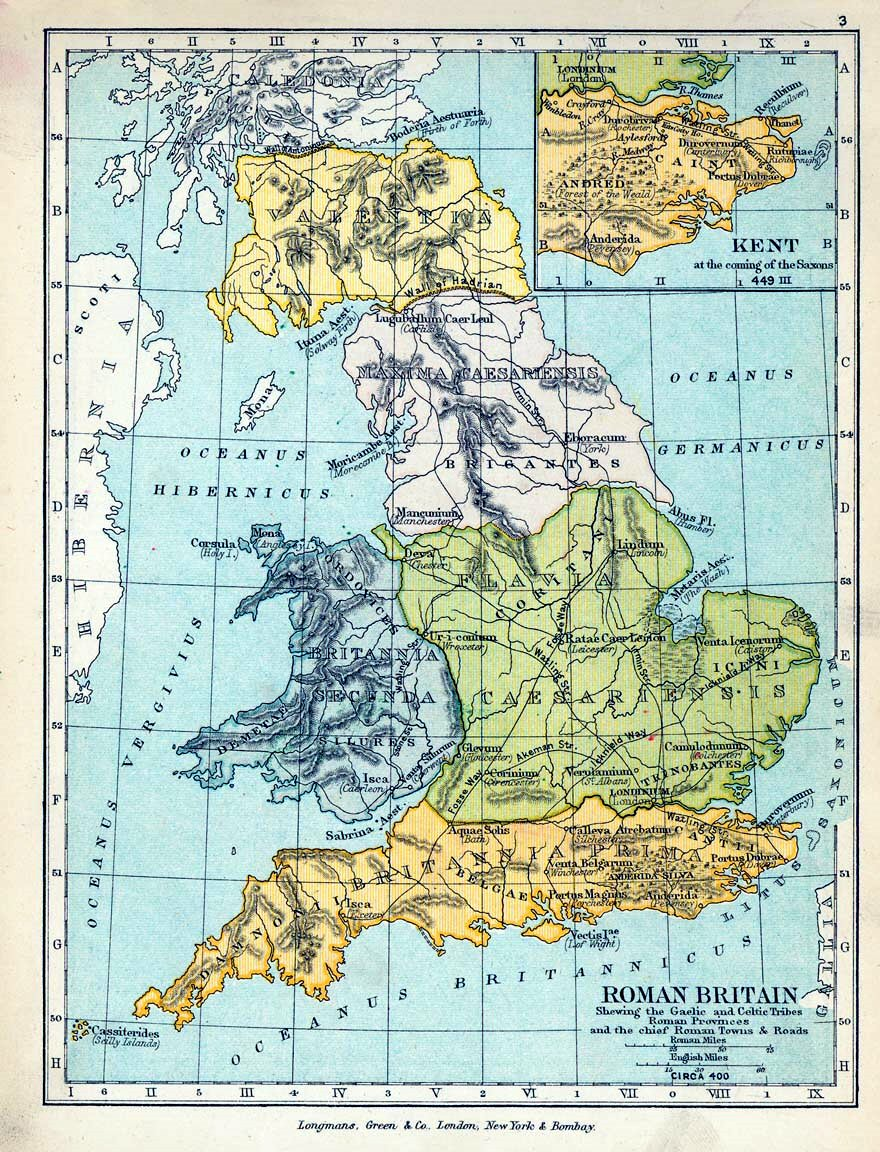
A map of the divisions of Roman Britain with the Scoti shown as a tribal grouping in the north of Ireland

Scotia is a Latin placename derived from Scoti, a Latin name for the Gaels, first attested in the late 3rd century. The Romans referred to Ireland as "Scotia" around 500 A.D. From the 9th century on, its meaning gradually shifted, so that it came to mean only the part of Britain lying north of the Firth of Forth: the Kingdom of Alba. By the later Middle Ages it had become the fixed Latin term for what in English is called Scotland.

== Etymology and derivations ==
The name of Scotland is derived from the Latin Scotia. The word Scoti (or Scotti) was first used by the Romans. It is found in Latin texts from the 4th century describing an Irish group that raided Roman Britain. It came to be applied to all Gaels. It is not believed that any Gaelic groups called themselves Scoti in ancient times, except when writing in Latin. Old Irish documents use the term Scot (plural Scuit) going back as far as the 9th century; for example, in the glossary of Cormac mac Cuilennáin.

Oman derived it from Scuit (modern Gaelic scoith), meaning someone cut off. He believed it referred to bands of outcast Gaelic raiders, suggesting that the Scots were to the Gaels what the Vikings were to the Norse.

The 19th-century author Aonghas MacCoinnich of Glasgow proposed that Scoti was derived from a Gaelic ethnonym (proposed by MacCoinnich) Sgaothaich from sgaoth "swarm", plus the derivational suffix -ach (plural -aich). However, this proposal to date has not been met with any response in mainstream place-name studies. Pope Leo X (1513–1521) decreed that the use of the name Scotia be confined to referring to land that is now Scotland.

Virtually all names for Scotland are based on the Scotia root (cf. Dutch Schotland, French Écosse, Czech Skotsko, Zulu IsiKotilandi, Māori Koterana, Hakka Sû-kak-làn, Quechua Iskusya, Turkish İskoçya etc.), either directly or via intermediate languages. The only exceptions are the Celtic languages, where the names are based on the Alba root; e.g., Manx Nalbin, Welsh Yr Alban, Irish "Albain."

== Medieval usage ==
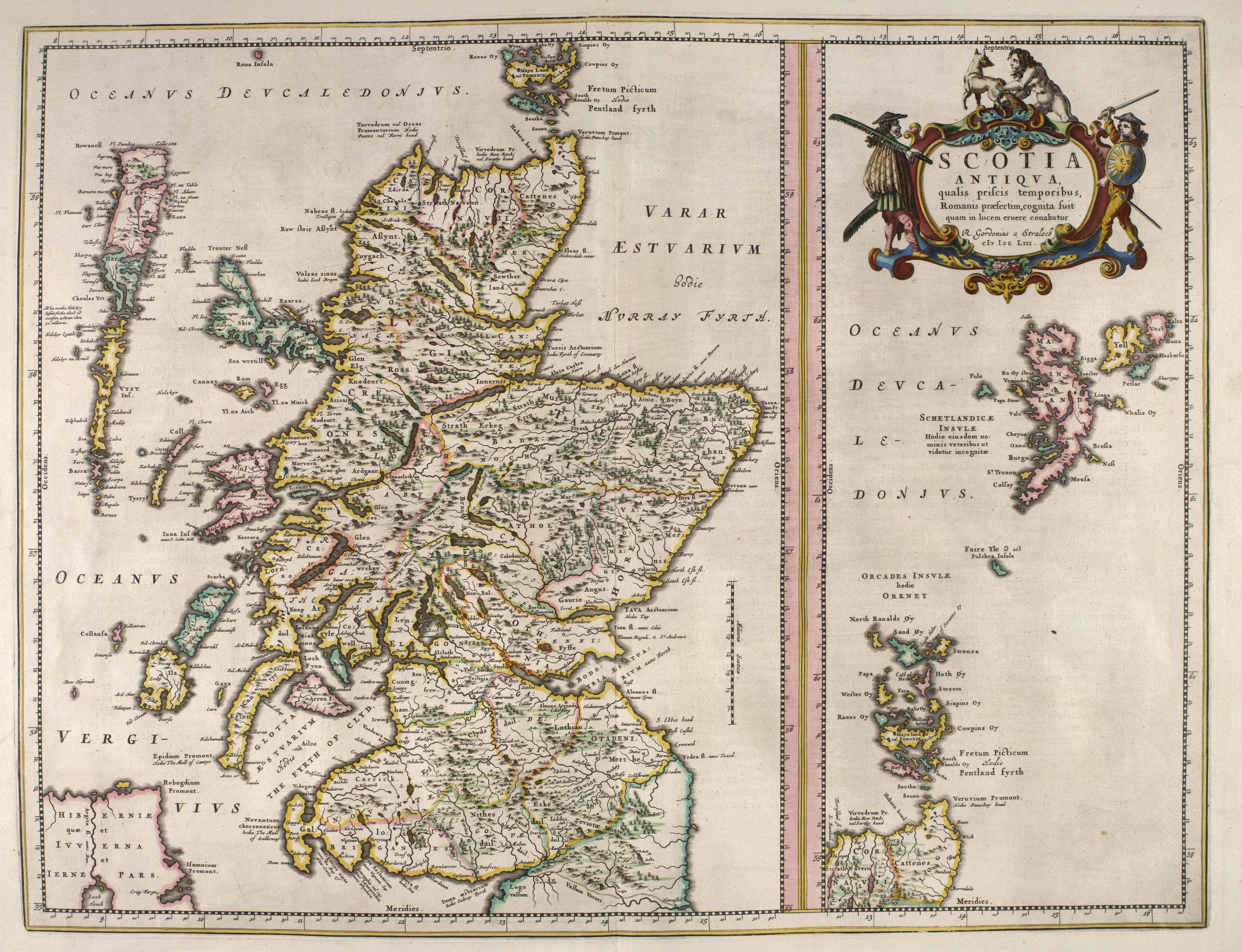
A map from 1654 illustrating the latter use of Scotia for Scotland and Hibernia/Ivverna for Ireland

Scotia translates to "Land of the Scots". It was a way of saying "Land of the Gaels". It was initially used as a name for Ireland, originally with ethnic connotations, for example in Adomnán's Life of Columba, or by Isidore of Seville, who wrote in 580 CE that "Scotia and Hibernia are the same country" (Isidore, lib. xii. c. 6). This is how it was used, for instance, by King Robert I of Scotland (Robert the Bruce) and Domhnall Ua Néill during the Scottish Wars of Independence, when Ireland was called Scotia Maior (greater Scotia) and Scotland Scotia Minor (lesser Scotia).

As a translation of Alba, Scotia could mean both the whole kingdom belonging to the King of Scots, or just Scotland north of the Forth. After the 11th century, Scotia was used mostly for the Kingdom of Alba, and later, by expansion, to refer to the Kingdom of Scotland in its modern extent; in this way, it became the fixed designation.

Pope Leo X of the Roman Catholic Church eventually granted Scotland exclusive right over the word, and this led to Anglo-Scottish takeovers of continental Gaelic monasteries (e.g., the Schottenklöster).

== In Irish sources ==
One of the oldest sources recorded was from medieval Monarchy. In the year 1005, after Brian Boru was crowned king, he adopted the title Imperator Scotorum, "Emperor of the Scoti" suggesting he saw himself as the overlord of all Scotia and Gaels. The title was however adopted and not formally provided.

Within Irish Mythology, Geoffrey Keating's Foras Feasa ar Éirinn, Ireland's "ninth name was Scotia; and it is the sons of Míleadh who gave that name to it, from their mother, whose name was Scota, daughter of Pharao Nectonibus; or it is why they called it Scotia, because that they are themselves the Scottish race from Scythia". According to the Middle Irish language synthetic history Lebor Gabála Érenn, she was the daughter of Pharaoh Necho II of Egypt. Writing in 1571, Edmund Campion named the pharaoh Amenophis; Keating named him Cincris.

== Other uses ==
In geography, the term is also used for the following:

- the Canadian province of Nova Scotia (New Scotland)
- the village of Scotia in New York State
- the Scotia-Glenville High School in New York State named after a Scottish settler
- the Scotia Sea between Antarctica and South America
- the Scotia Plate, a tectonic plate located to the south of South America

The term also is used/for the following purposes;

- to describe a piece of wood millwork that is used at the base of columns and in stair construction
- Scotiabank, a trade name for the Bank of Nova Scotia
- (rarely) as a feminine first name
- Pride Scotia, Scotland's national LGBT pride festival, involving a march and a community based festival held in June

== See also ==
- Scotia's Grave, in the hills, just south of Tralee, County Kerry
- Scottish Gaelic
