= John of Fordun =

14th-century Scottish historian

John of Fordun (before 1360 – c. 1384) was a Scottish chronicler. It is generally stated that he was born at Fordoun, Mearns. It is certain that he was a secular priest, and that he composed his history in the latter part of the 14th century. It is probable that he was a chaplain in St Machar's Cathedral of Aberdeen.

The work of Fordun is the earliest attempt to write a continuous history of Scotland. Fordun undertook this task because his patriotic zeal was roused by the removal or destruction of many national records by Edward III of England. He travelled across England and Ireland, collecting material for his history.

Collectively, this work, divided into five books, is known as the Chronica Gentis Scotorum. The first three are unverified historically, which therefore casts doubt on their accuracy. Yet they also form the groundwork on which Boece and George Buchanan afterwards based some of their historical writings. Thomas Innes argued that some of the history these men presented was doubtful in his Critical Essay (i, pp. 201–204), but Innes himself had his own political agenda and his work has also been criticized by modern historians.

Fordun's claim of an unbroken line of royal descent from Fergus I in 330 BC can be seen as a contribution to a Scottish national origin myth constructed to counter the legend of Brutus of Troy, which English monarchs deployed to claim sovereignty over the whole of Britain. The 4th and 5th books contain much valuable information, and become more authentic the nearer they approach the author's own time. The 5th book concludes with the death of King David I in 1153.

More recent scholarship, largely by Professor Dauvit Broun of Glasgow University, suggests that the portion of what has hitherto been considered Fordun's chronicle, i.e. events after 1153, should be regarded as two separate works, neither of which can, in any meaningful sense, be attributed to Fordun himself. Therefore, the list of yearly events after the death of King David I in 1153 should be regarded as the separate works Gesta Annalia I and Gesta Annalia II.

The new thinking, put forward by Professor Broun, is that John of Fordun's work is the chronicle alone. So Fordun's own work proceeds no later than the death of King David I in 1153. Therefore, Fordun cannot be regarded as the author of Gesta Annalia and that Gesta Annalia should be regarded as two separate works. This is because an examination of the surviving manuscripts reveals two separate texts which, for convenience are called Gesta Annalia I and Gesta Annalia II.

Gesta Annalia I ends when, in February 1285, King Alexander III despatches an embassy to France to find a new wife for him. 'Gesta Annalia II' begins with Alexander III's marriage to his new bride in October 1285. It is considered that Gesta Annalia I is what remains extant of a much longer work. It is considered that the author of Gesta Annalia ended this work around February 1285. Then, at some point, a scribe copied Gesta Annalia I and appended it to Fordun's chronicle. As to whether that scribe may have been Fordun himself and that he appended Gesta Annalia I to his own chronicle "is an open question", according to Professor Broun.

Based on these suppositions, the Gesta Annalia I in circulation is a copy of an original work. However, it is considered that whoever copied the original work left it largely undisturbed, i.e. did not materially alter the text as there is a consistency of writing and presentation of the history in Gesta Annalia I which is not found to the same extent with Gesta Annalia II.

Gesta Annalia II is a more challenging, and it has been suggested more interesting, work. Whereas there is a consistency in the style and presentation of Gesta Annalia I, that is not the case in Gesta Annalia II.

Historical texts published before this new thinking was accepted will still refer to Fordun as the author of comments relating to the period after 1153. These comments are now cited as Gesta Annalia I or II. Besides these five books, published around 1360, Fordun also wrote part of another book, and collected materials to cover the history of Scotland to a later period. These materials were used by a continuator who wrote in the middle of the 15th century, and who is identified with Walter Bower, abbot of the monastery of Inchcolm. Bower's additions form eleven books, and bring forward the narrative to the death of King James I of Scots in 1437. According to the custom of the time, the continuator did not hesitate to interpolate Fordun's portion of the work with additions of his own. The whole history thus compiled is known as the Scotichronicon.

The first printed edition of Fordun's work was that of Thomas Gale in his Scriptores quindecim (vol. iii), which was published in 1691. This was followed by Thomas Hearne's (5 vol.) edition in 1722. The whole work, including Bower's continuation, was published by Walter Goodall at Edinburgh in 1759.

In 1871 and 1872, Fordun's chronicle, in the original Latin and in an English translation, was edited by William F. Skene in The Historians of Scotland. The preface to this edition collects all the biographical details and gives full references to manuscripts and editions.

== Notes ==
- For further discussion of the political motivations which may have influenced the approach taken in the Chronica Gentis Scotorum, see : Goldstein, J. The Matter of Scotland: Historical Narrative in Medieval Scotland University of Nebraska Press (1993); esp. Chapter 4.
