= Gesta Annalia =

Gesta Annalia ("Yearly Deeds") is an important medieval chronicle detailing the history of Scotland.

The history seems to be split into two main sections. Whilst Gesta Annalia I seems to concern events to February 1285, Gesta Annalia II appears to concern events between October 1285 to 1363. The composition of Gesta Annalia I was likely completed in 1285, between February and the middle of April.
