= Shamrock =

Sprig of young clover, used as a symbol of Ireland

A wood sorrel, often called a shamrock, especially in the United States

A shamrock is a type of clover, used as a symbol of Ireland. The word shamrock comes from Irish seamróg ([ˈʃamˠ.ɾˠoːɡ]), which is the diminutive of the Irish word seamair and simply means "young clover".

At most times, Shamrock refers to either the species Trifolium dubium (lesser/yellow clover, Irish: seamair bhuí) or Trifolium repens (white clover, Irish: seamair bhán). However, other three-leaved plants—such as Medicago lupulina, Trifolium pratense, and Oxalis acetosella—are sometimes called shamrocks. The shamrock was traditionally used for its medicinal properties, and was a popular motif in Victorian times.

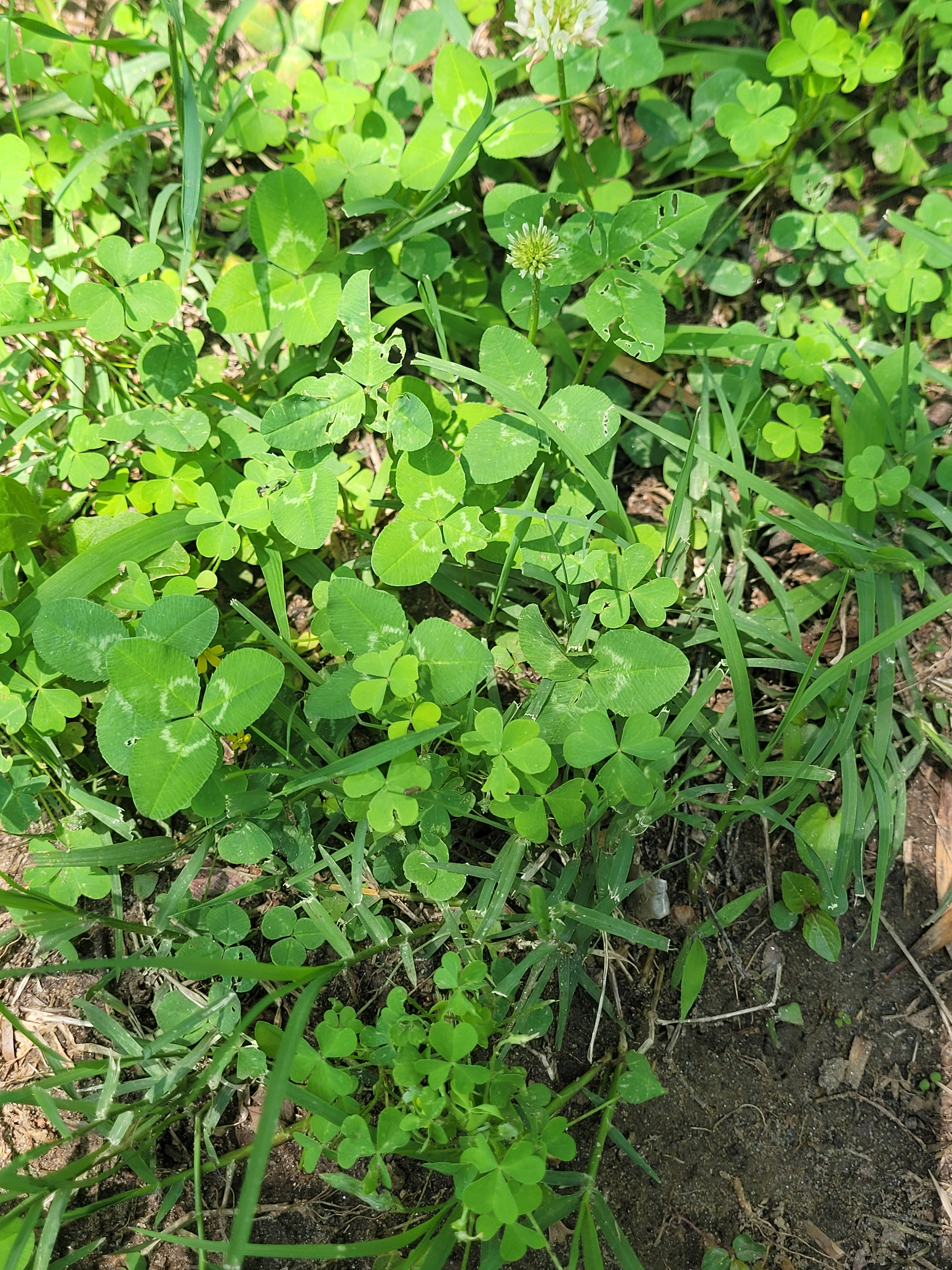
White clover (Trifolium repens) and yellow wood sorrel (Oxalis stricta)

== Botanical species ==
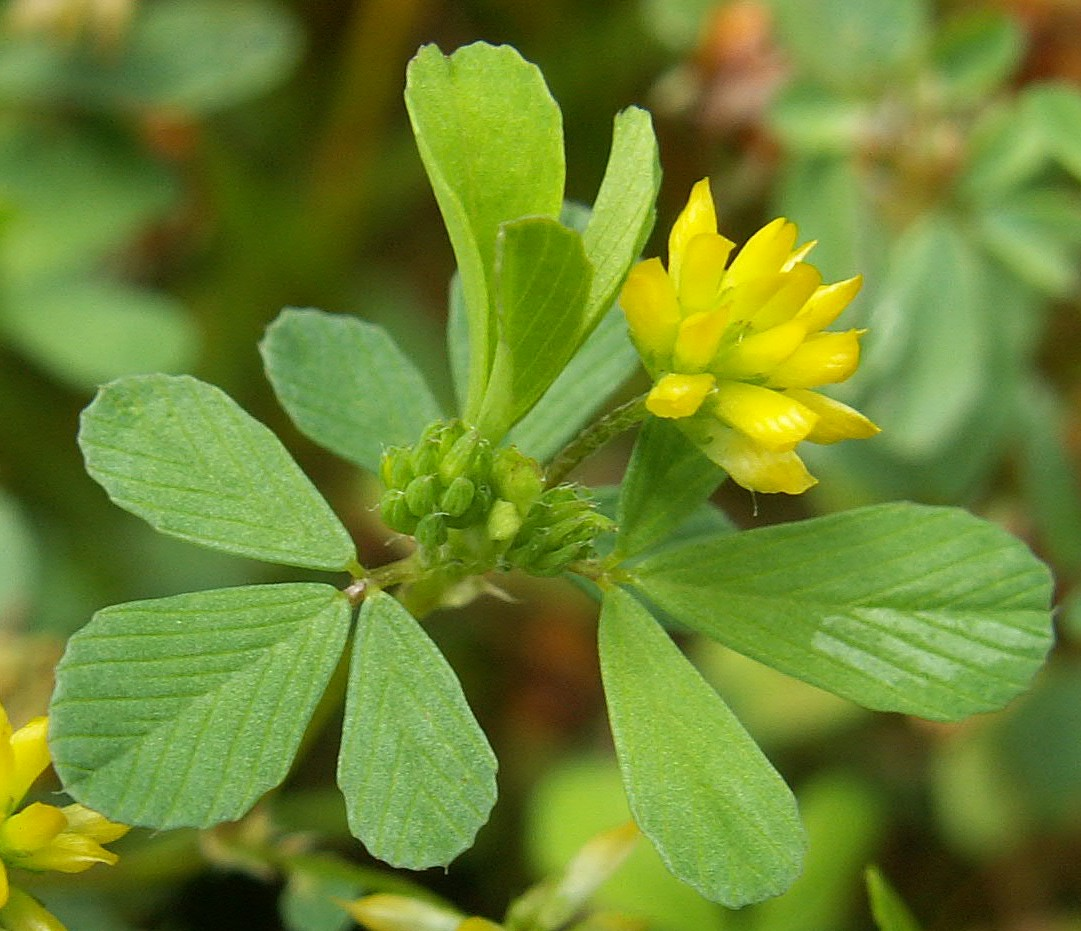
Trifolium dubium

There is still not a consensus over the precise botanical species of clover that is the "true" shamrock. John Gerard in his herbal of 1597 defined the shamrock as Trifolium pratense or Trifolium pratense flore albo, meaning red or red clover with white flowers. He described the plant in English as "Three leaved grasse" or "Medow Trefoile", "which are called in Irish Shamrockes". The Irish botanist Caleb Threlkeld, writing in 1726 in his work entitled Synopsis Stirpium Hibernicarum or A Treatise on Native Irish Plants followed Gerard in identifying the shamrock as Trifolium pratense, calling it White Field Clover.

The botanist Carl Linnaeus in his 1737 work Flora Lapponica identifies the shamrock as Trifolium pratense, mentioning it by name as Chambroch, with the following curious remark: "Hiberni suo Chambroch, quod est Trifolium pratense purpureum, aluntur, celeres & promtissimi roburis" ('The Irish call it shamrock, which is purple field clover, and which they eat to make them speedy and of nimble strength').

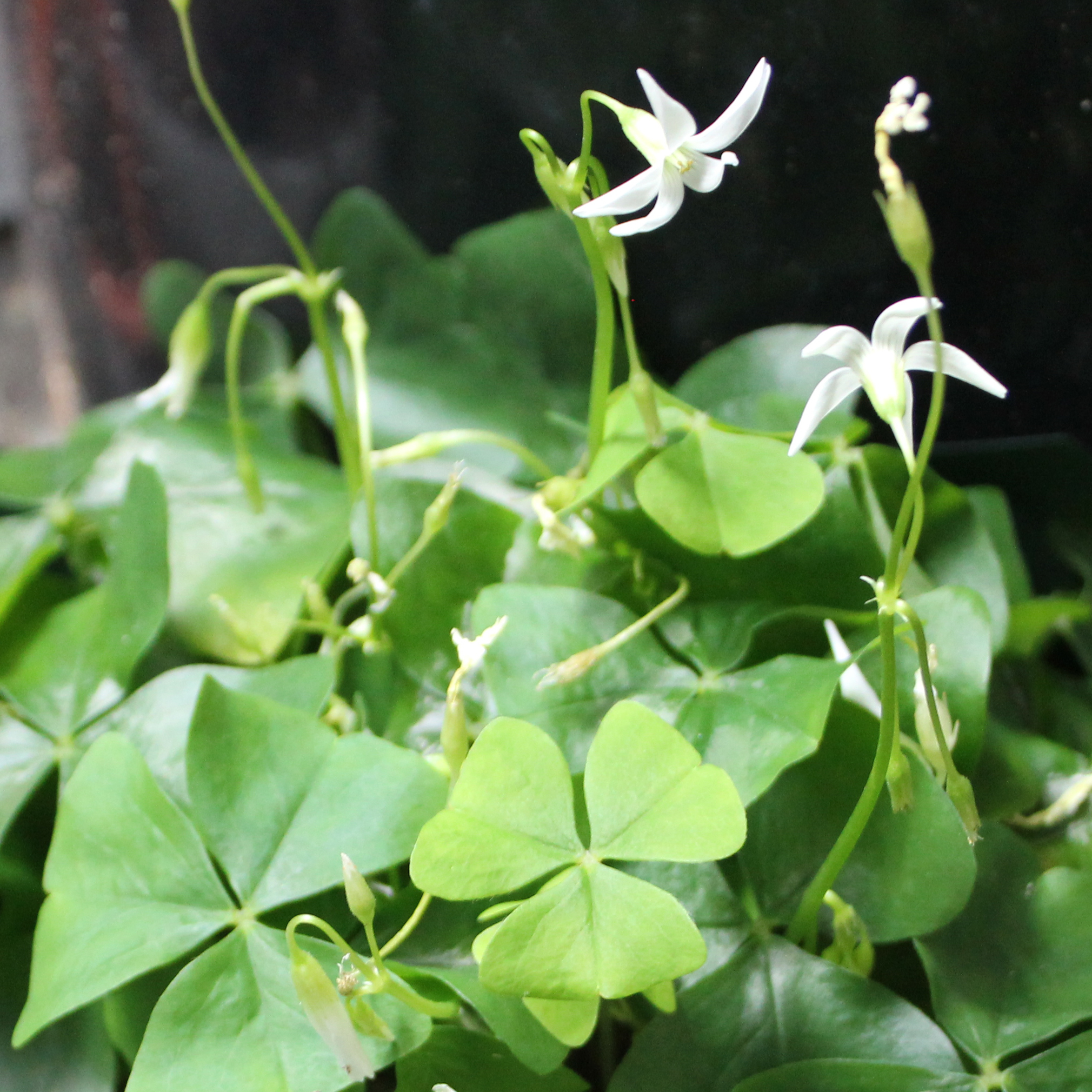
This flowering shamrock is a South American species of wood sorrel, Oxalis regnellii.

Linnaeus based his information that the Irish ate shamrock on the comments of English Elizabethan authors such as Edmund Spenser who remarked that the shamrock used to be eaten by the Irish, especially in times of hardship and famine. It has since been argued however, that the Elizabethans were confused by the similarity between the Irish (Gaelic) name for young clover seamróg, and the name for wood sorrel seamsóg.

The situation regarding the identity of the shamrock was further confused by a London botanist James Ebenezer Bicheno, who proclaimed in a dissertation in 1830 that the real shamrock was Oxalis acetosella, a species of wood sorrel. Bicheno falsely claimed that clover was not a native Irish plant and had only been introduced into Ireland in the middle of the 17th century, and based his argument on the same comments by Elizabethan authors that shamrock had been eaten. Bicheno argued that this fitted the wood sorrel better than clover, as wood sorrel was often eaten as a green and used to flavour food. Bicheno's argument has not been generally accepted however, as the weight of evidence favours a species of clover.

A more scientific approach was taken by English botanists James Britten and Robert Holland, who stated in their Dictionary of English Plant Names published in 1878, that their investigations had revealed that Trifolium dubium was the species sold most frequently in Covent Garden as shamrock on St. Patrick's Day, and that it was worn in at least 13 counties in Ireland.

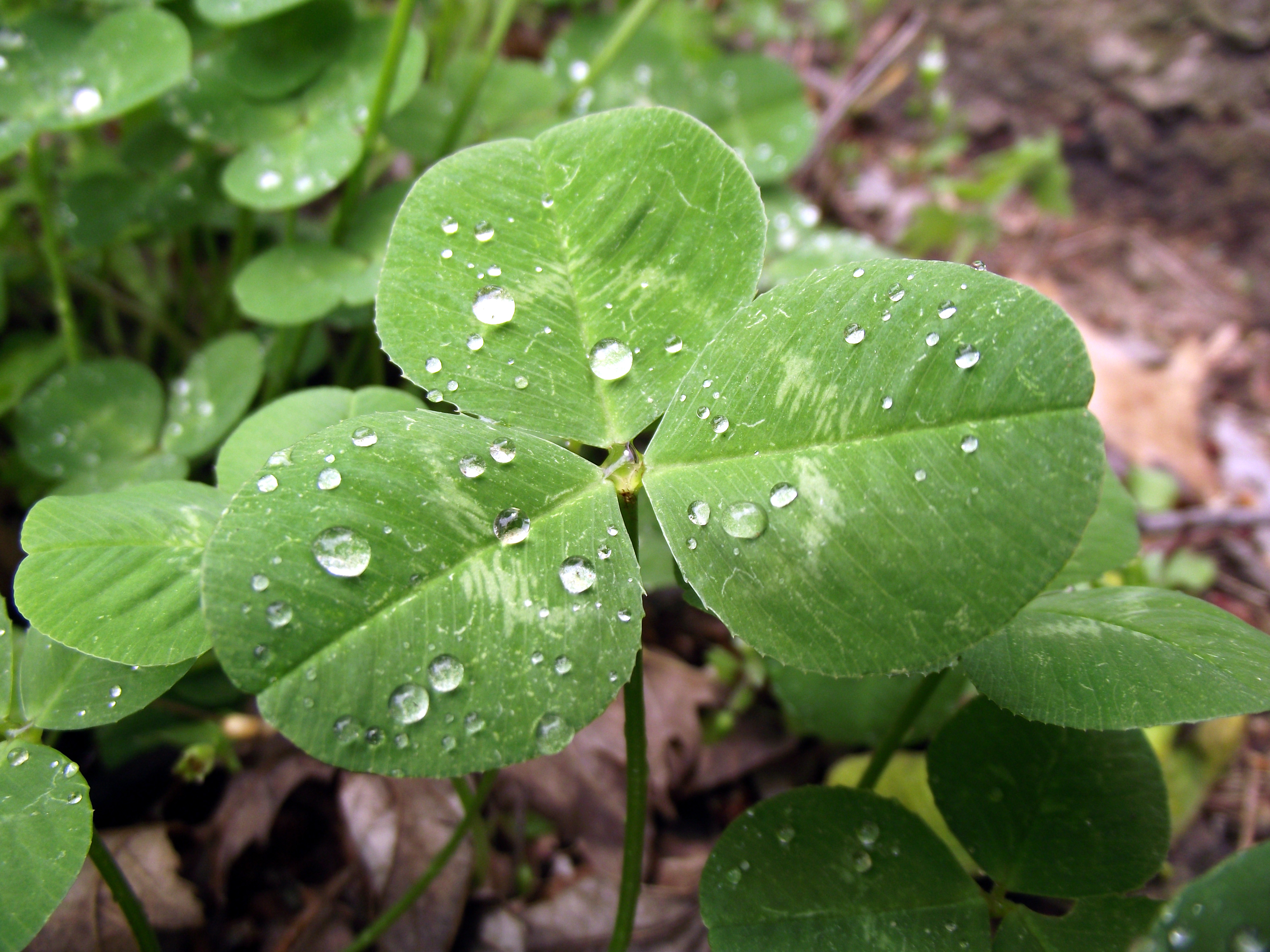
Trifolium repens

Finally, detailed investigations to settle the matter were carried out in two separate botanical surveys in Ireland, one in 1893 and the other in 1988. The 1893 survey was carried out by Nathaniel Colgan, an amateur naturalist working as a clerk in Dublin; while the 1988 survey was carried out by E. Charles Nelson, Director of the Irish National Botanic Gardens. Both surveys involved asking people from all across Ireland to send in examples of shamrock, which were then planted and allowed to flower, so that their botanical species could be identified. The results of both surveys were very similar, showing that the conception of the shamrock in Ireland had changed little in almost a hundred years. The results of the surveys are shown in the table below.

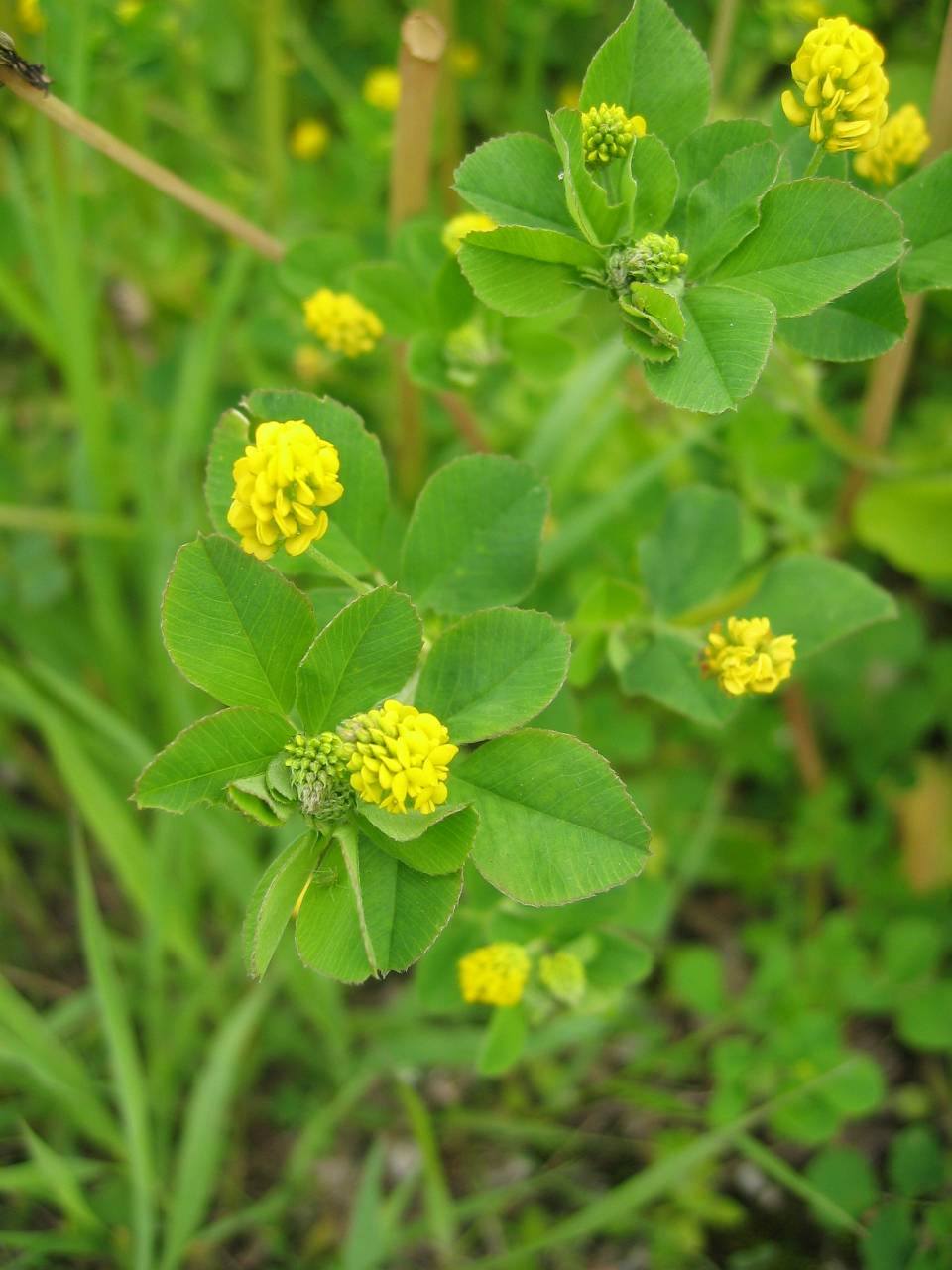
Medicago lupulina

Shamrock survey
Botanical name	Common name	Percentage	
Botanical name	Common name	1893	1988
Trifolium dubium	Lesser clover	51%	46%
Trifolium repens	White clover	34%	35%
Trifolium pratense	Red clover	6%	4%
Medicago lupulina	Black medick	6%	7%
Oxalis acetosella	Wood sorrel	_	3%
Various Trifolium spp., Oxalis spp.		3%	5%

The results show that there is no one "true" species of shamrock, but that Trifolium dubium (lesser clover) is considered to be the shamrock by roughly half of Irish people, and Trifolium repens (white clover) by another third, with the remaining sixth split between Trifolium pratense (red clover), Medicago lupulina (black medick), Oxalis acetosella (wood sorrel), and various other species of Trifolium and Oxalis. None of the species in the survey is unique to Ireland, and all are common European species, so there is no botanical basis for the belief that the shamrock is a unique species of plant that only grows in Ireland.

== Early references ==
The word shamrock derives from seamair óg or young clover, and references to semair or clover appear in early Irish literature, generally as a description of a flowering clovered plain. For example, in the series of medieval metrical poems about various Irish places called the Metrical Dindshenchus, a poem about Tailtiu or Teltown in County Meath describes it as a plain blossoming with flowering clover (mag scothach scothshemrach). Similarly, another story tells of how St. Brigid decided to stay in County Kildare when she saw the delightful plain covered in clover blossom (scoth-shemrach). However, the literature in Irish makes no distinction between clover and shamrock, and it is only in English that shamrock emerges as a distinct word.

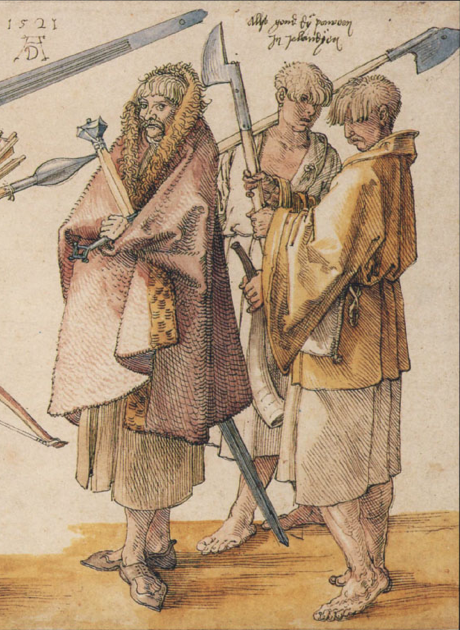
Three "wild Irish" kerns by Albrecht Dürer (1521)

The first mention of shamrock in the English language occurs in 1571 in the work of the English Elizabethan scholar Edmund Campion. In his work Boke of the Histories of Irelande, Campion describes the habits of the "wild Irish" and states that the Irish ate shamrock: "Shamrotes, watercresses, rootes, and other herbes they feed upon". The statement that the Irish ate shamrock was widely repeated in later works and seems to be a confusion with the Irish word seamsóg or wood sorrel (Oxalis). There is no evidence from any Irish source that the Irish ate clover, but there is evidence that the Irish ate wood sorrel. For example, in the medieval Irish work Buile Shuibhne (The Frenzy of Sweeney), the king Sweeney, who has gone mad and is living in the woods as a hermit, lists wood sorrel among the plants he feeds upon.

The English Elizabethan poet Edmund Spenser, writing soon after in 1596, described his observations of war-torn Munster after the Desmond Rebellion in his work A View of the Present State of Ireland. Here shamrock is described as a food eaten as a last resort by starving people desperate for any nourishment during a post-war famine:

Anatomies of death, they spake like ghosts, crying out of theire graves; they did eat of the carrions .... and if they found a plott of water cresses or shamrockes theyr they flocked as to a feast for the time, yett not able long to contynewe therewithall.

The idea that the Irish ate shamrock is repeated in the writing of Fynes Moryson, one-time secretary to the Lord Deputy of Ireland. In his 1617 work An itinerary thorow Twelve Dominions, Moryson describes the "wild Irish", and in this case their supposed habit of eating shamrock is a result of their marginal hand-to-mouth existence as bandits. Moryson claims that the Irish "willingly eat the herbe Schamrock being of a sharpe taste which as they run and are chased to and fro they snatch like beasts out of the ditches." The reference to a sharp taste is suggestive of the bitter taste of wood sorrel.

What is clear is that by the end of the sixteenth century the shamrock had become known to English writers as a plant particularly associated with the Irish, but only with a confused notion that the shamrock was a plant eaten by them. To a herbalist like Gerard it is clear that the shamrock is clover, but other English writers do not appear to know the botanical identity of the shamrock. This is not surprising, as they probably received their information at second or third hand. It is notable that there is no mention anywhere in these writings of St. Patrick or the legend of his using the shamrock to explain the Holy Trinity. However, there are two possible references to the custom of "drowning the shamrock" in "usquebagh" or whiskey. In 1607, the playwright Edward Sharpham in his play The Fleire included a reference to "Maister Oscabath the Irishman ... and Maister Shamrough his lackey". Later, a 1630 work entitled Sir Gregory Nonsence by the poet John Taylor contains the lines: "Whilste all the Hibernian Kernes in multitudes, /Did feast with shamerags steeved in Usquebagh."

== Link to St. Patrick ==
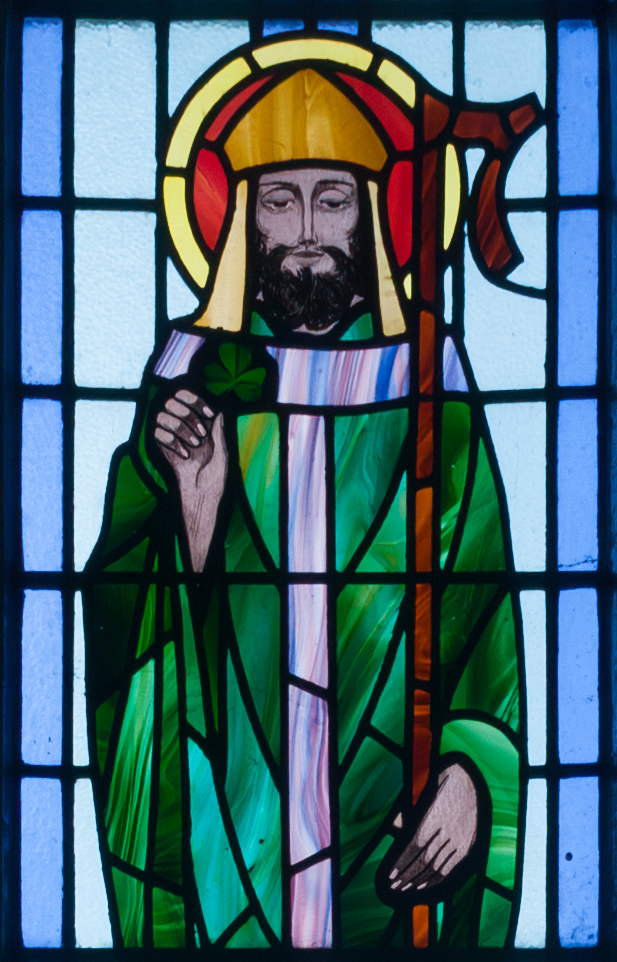
St. Patrick depicted with shamrock in detail of stained glass window in St. Benin's Church, Kilbennan, County Galway, Ireland

Traditionally, shamrock is said to have been used by Saint Patrick to illustrate the Christian doctrine of the Holy Trinity when Christianising Ireland in the 5th century. The first evidence of a link between St Patrick and the shamrock appears in 1675 on the St Patrick's Coppers or Halpennies. These appear to show a figure of St Patrick preaching to a crowd while holding a shamrock, presumably to explain the doctrine of the Holy Trinity. When Saint Patrick arrived in Ireland in 431, he is said to have used the shamrock to teach pagans the Holy Trinity. In pagan Ireland, three was a significant number and the Irish had many triple deities, which could have aided St Patrick in his evangelisation efforts. Patricia Monaghan states that "There is no evidence that the clover or wood sorrel (both of which are called shamrocks) were sacred to the Celts". However, Jack Santino speculates that "The shamrock was probably associated with the earth and assumed by the druids to be symbolic of the regenerative powers of nature ... Nevertheless, the shamrock, whatever its history as a folk symbol, today has its meaning in a Christian context. Pictures of Saint Patrick depict him driving the snakes out of Ireland with a cross in one hand and a sprig of shamrocks in the other." Roger Homan writes, "We can perhaps see St Patrick drawing upon the visual concept of the triskele when he uses the shamrock to explain the Trinity". Why the Celts to whom St Patrick was preaching would have needed an explanation of the concept of a triple deity is not clear, since at least two separate triple goddesses are known to have been worshipped in pagan Ireland – Ériu, Fódla and Banba; and Badb Catha, Macha and The Morrígan.

The first written mention of the link does not appear until 1681, in the account of Thomas Dineley, an English traveller to Ireland. Dineley writes:

The 17th day of March yeerly is St Patricks, an immoveable feast, when ye Irish of all stations and condicions were crosses in their hatts, some of pinns, some of green ribbon, and the vulgar superstitiously wear shamroges, 3 leav'd grass, which they likewise eat (they say) to cause a sweet breath.

There is nothing in Dineley's account of the legend of St. Patrick using the shamrock to teach the mystery of the Holy Trinity, and this story does not appear in writing anywhere until a 1726 work by the botanist Caleb Threlkeld. Threlkeld identifies the shamrock as White Field Clover (Trifolium pratense album ) and comments rather acerbically on St. Patrick's Day customs including the wearing of shamrocks:

This plant is worn by the people in their hats upon the 17. Day of March yearly, (which is called St. Patrick's Day.) It being a current tradition, that by this Three Leafed Grass, he emblematically set forth to them the Mystery of the Holy Trinity. However that be, when they wet their Seamar-oge, they often commit excess in liquor, which is not a right keeping of a day to the Lord; error generally leading to debauchery.

The Rev Threlkeld's remarks on liquor undoubtedly refer to the custom of toasting St. Patrick's memory with "St. Patrick's Pot", or "drowning the shamrock" as it is otherwise known. After mass on St. Patrick's Day the traditional custom of the menfolk was to lift the usual fasting restrictions of Lent and repair to the nearest tavern to mark the occasion with as many St. Patrick's Pots as they deemed necessary. The drowning of the shamrock was accompanied by a certain amount of ritual as one account explains:

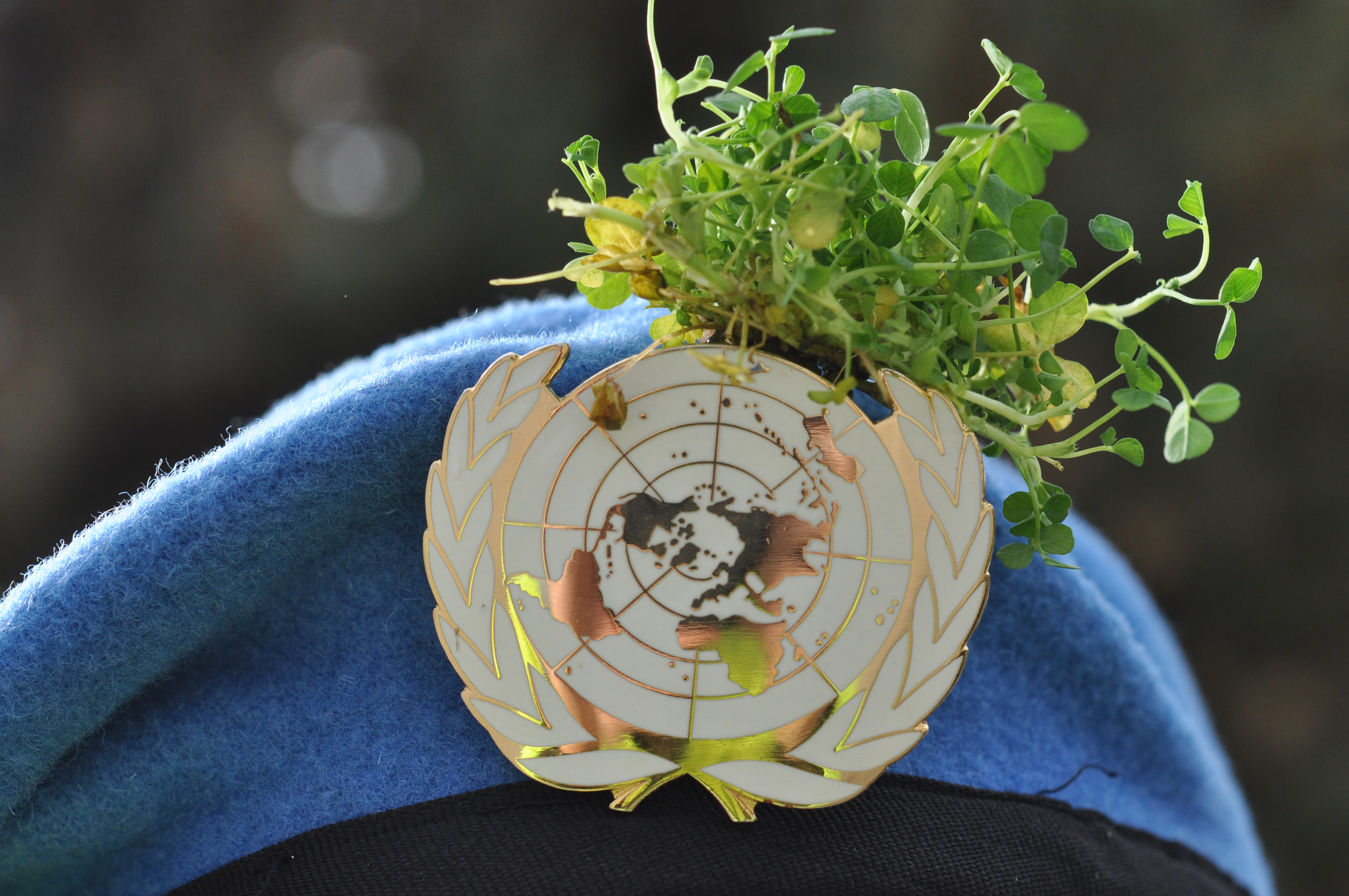
Shamrock on an Irish Defence Forces UN beret being worn on Saint Patrick's Day

"The drowning of the shamrock" by no means implies it was necessary to get drunk in doing so. At the end of the day the shamrock which has been worn in the coat or the hat is removed and put into the final glass of grog or tumbler of punch; and when the health has been drunk or the toast honoured, the shamrock should be picked out from the bottom of the glass and thrown over the left shoulder.

The shamrock is still chiefly associated with Saint Patrick's Day, which has become the Irish national holiday, and is observed with parades and celebrations worldwide. The custom of wearing shamrock on the day is still observed and depictions of shamrocks are habitually seen during the celebrations.

== Symbol of Ireland ==
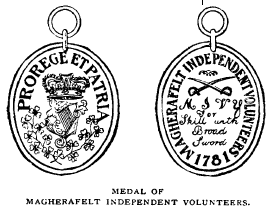
Drawing of the medal awarded to the First Magherafelt Volunteers for skill with broadsword, showing shamrocks

As St. Patrick is Ireland's patron saint, the shamrock has been used as a symbol of Ireland since the 18th century. The shamrock first began to evolve from a symbol purely associated with St. Patrick to an Irish national symbol when it was taken up as an emblem by rival militias during the turbulent politics of the late eighteenth century. On one side were the Volunteers (also known as the Irish Volunteers), who were local militias in late 18th century Ireland, raised to defend Ireland from the threat of French and Spanish invasion when regular British soldiers were withdrawn from Ireland to fight during the American Revolutionary War. On the other side were revolutionary nationalist groups, such as the United Irishmen.

Among the Volunteers, examples of the use of the shamrock include its appearance on the guidon of the Royal Glin Hussars formed in July 1779 by the Knight of Glin, and its appearance on the flags of the Limerick Volunteers, the Castle Ray Fencibles and the Braid Volunteers. The United Irishmen adopted green as their revolutionary colour and wore green uniforms or ribbons in their hats, and the green concerned was often associated with the shamrock. The song The Wearing of the Green commemorated their exploits and various versions exist which mention the shamrock. The Erin go bragh flag was used as their standard and was often depicted accompanied by shamrocks, and in 1799 a revolutionary journal entitled The Shamroc briefly appeared in which the aims of the rebellion were supported.

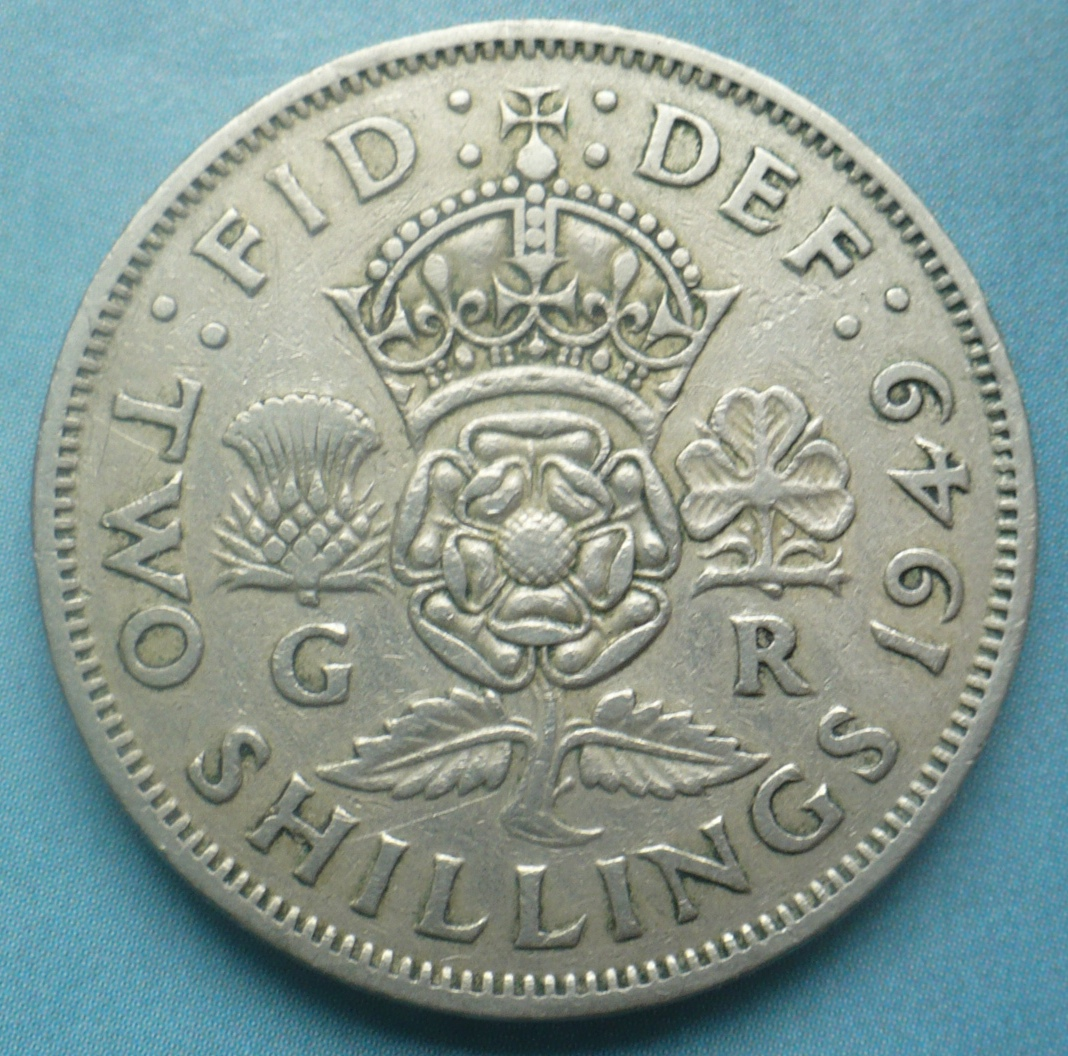
British two-shilling coin (1949)

Since the 1800 Acts of Union between Britain and Ireland the shamrock was incorporated into the Royal Coat of Arms of the United Kingdom, depicted growing from a single stem alongside the rose of England, and the thistle of Scotland to symbolise the unity of the three kingdoms. Since then, the shamrock has regularly appeared alongside the rose, thistle and (sometimes) leek for Wales in British coins such as the two shilling and crown, and in stamps. The rose, thistle and shamrock motif also appears regularly on British public buildings such as Buckingham Palace.

Throughout the nineteenth century the popularity of the shamrock as a symbol of Ireland grew, and it was depicted in many illustrations on items such as book covers and St. Patrick's Day postcards. It was also mentioned in many songs and ballads of the time. For example, a popular ballad called The Shamrock Shore lamented the state of Ireland in the nineteenth century. Another typical example of such a ballad appears in the works of Thomas Moore whose Oh the Shamrock embodies the Victorian spirit of sentimentality. It was immensely popular and contributed to raising the profile of the shamrock as an image of Ireland:

Oh The Shamrock

Through Erin's Isle,
To sport awhile,
As Love and Valor wander'd
With Wit, the sprite,
Whose quiver bright
A thousand arrows squander'd.
Where'er they pass,
A triple grass
Shoots up, with dew-drops streaming,
As softly green
As emeralds seen
Through purest crystal gleaming.
Oh the Shamrock, the green immortal Shamrock!
Chosen leaf
Of Bard and Chief,
Old Erin's native Shamrock!

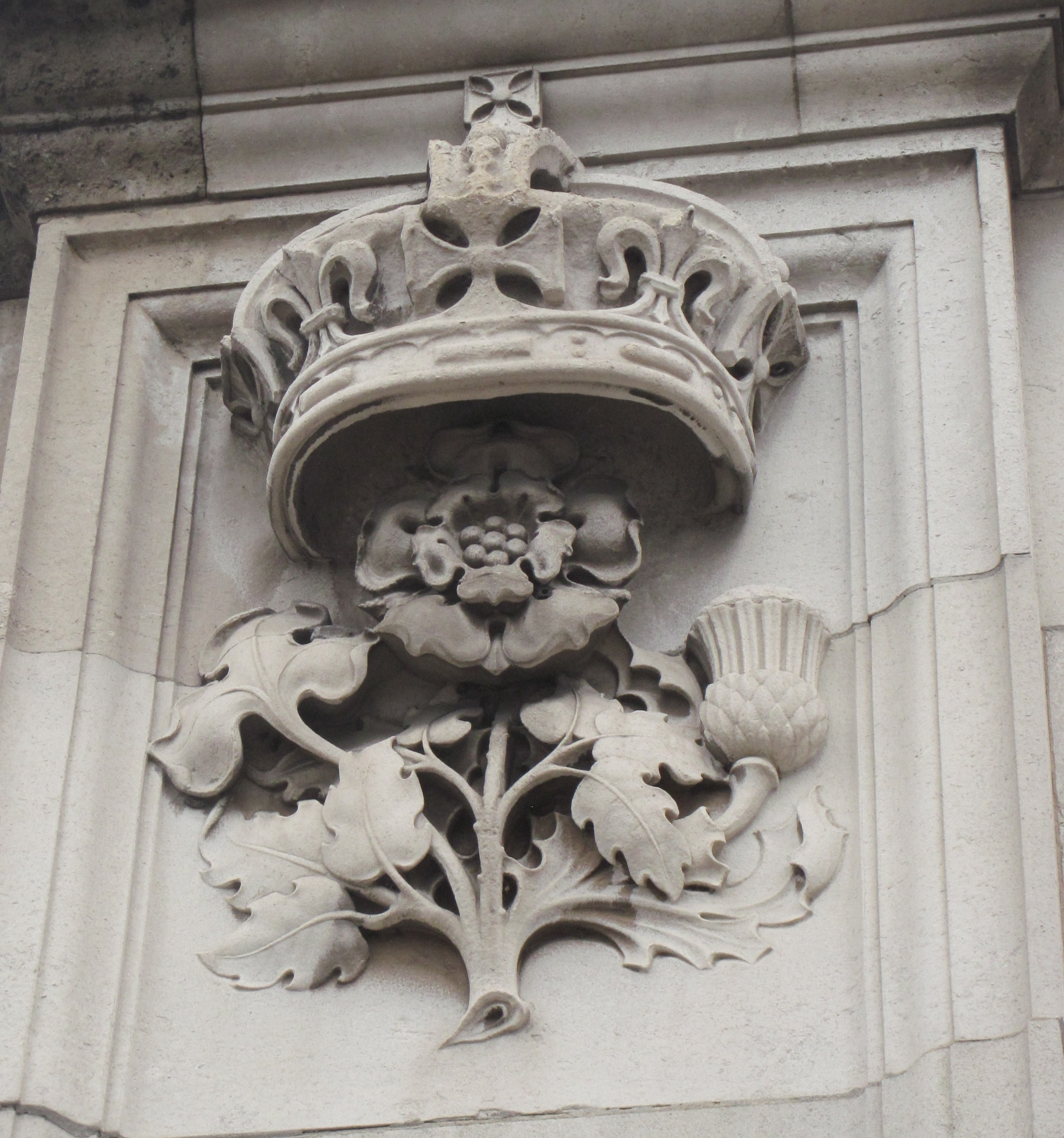
Rose, thistle and shamrock motif on gate pillar at Buckingham Palace

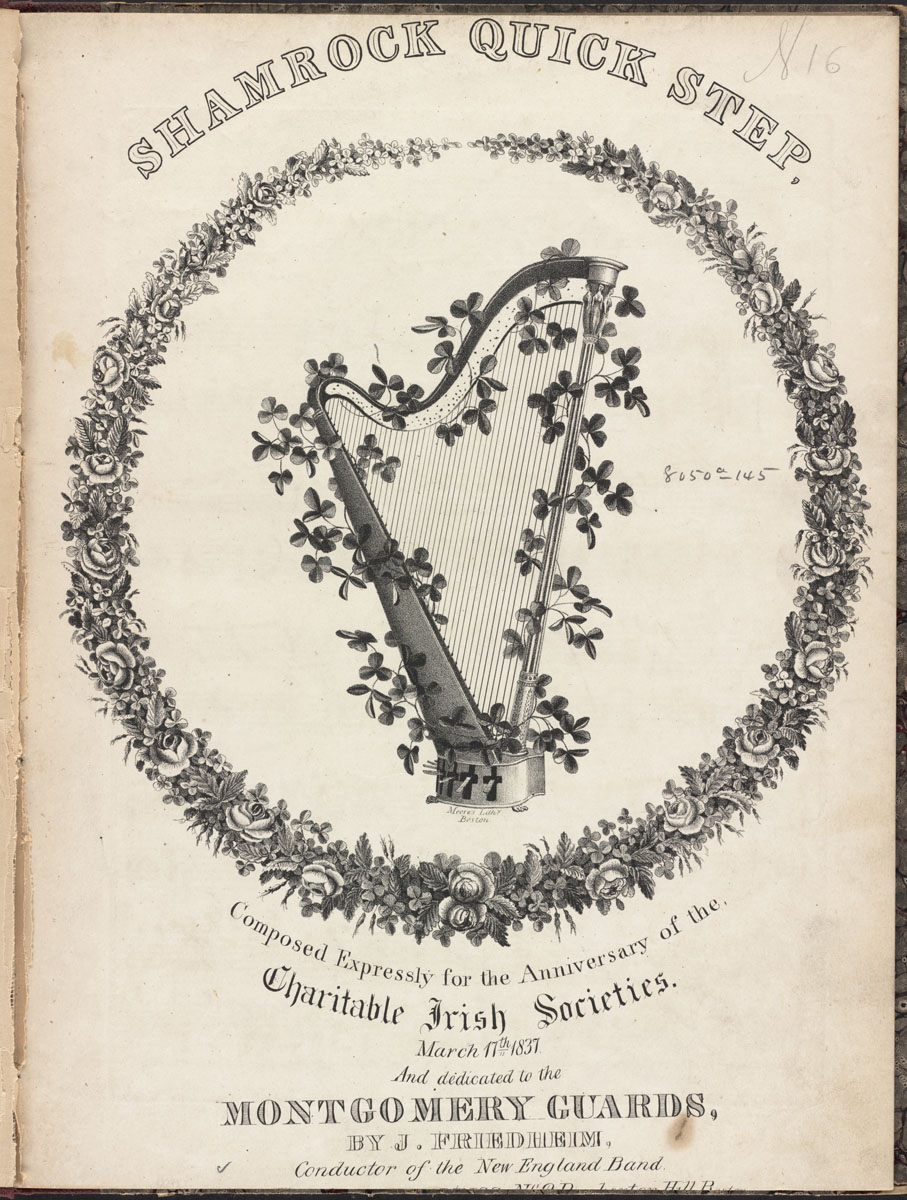
Irish American Music sheet

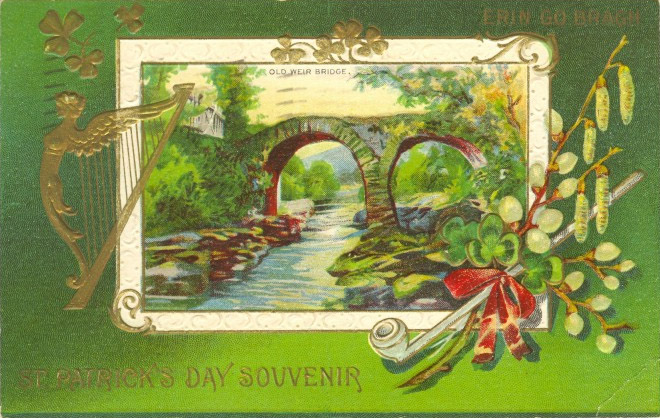
St Patrick's Day postcard (1912)

Throughout the nineteenth and twentieth centuries, the shamrock continued to appear in a variety of settings. For example, the shamrock appeared on many buildings in Ireland as a decorative motif, such as on the facade of the Kildare Street Club building in Dublin, St. Patrick's Cathedral, Armagh, and the Harp and Lion Bar in Listowel, County Kerry. It also appears on street furniture, such as old lamp standards like those in Mountjoy Square in Dublin, and on monuments like the Parnell Monument, and the O'Connell Monument, both in O'Connell Street, Dublin. Shamrocks also appeared on decorative items such as glass, china, jewellery, poplin and Irish lace. Belleek Pottery in County Fermanagh, for example, regularly features shamrock motifs.

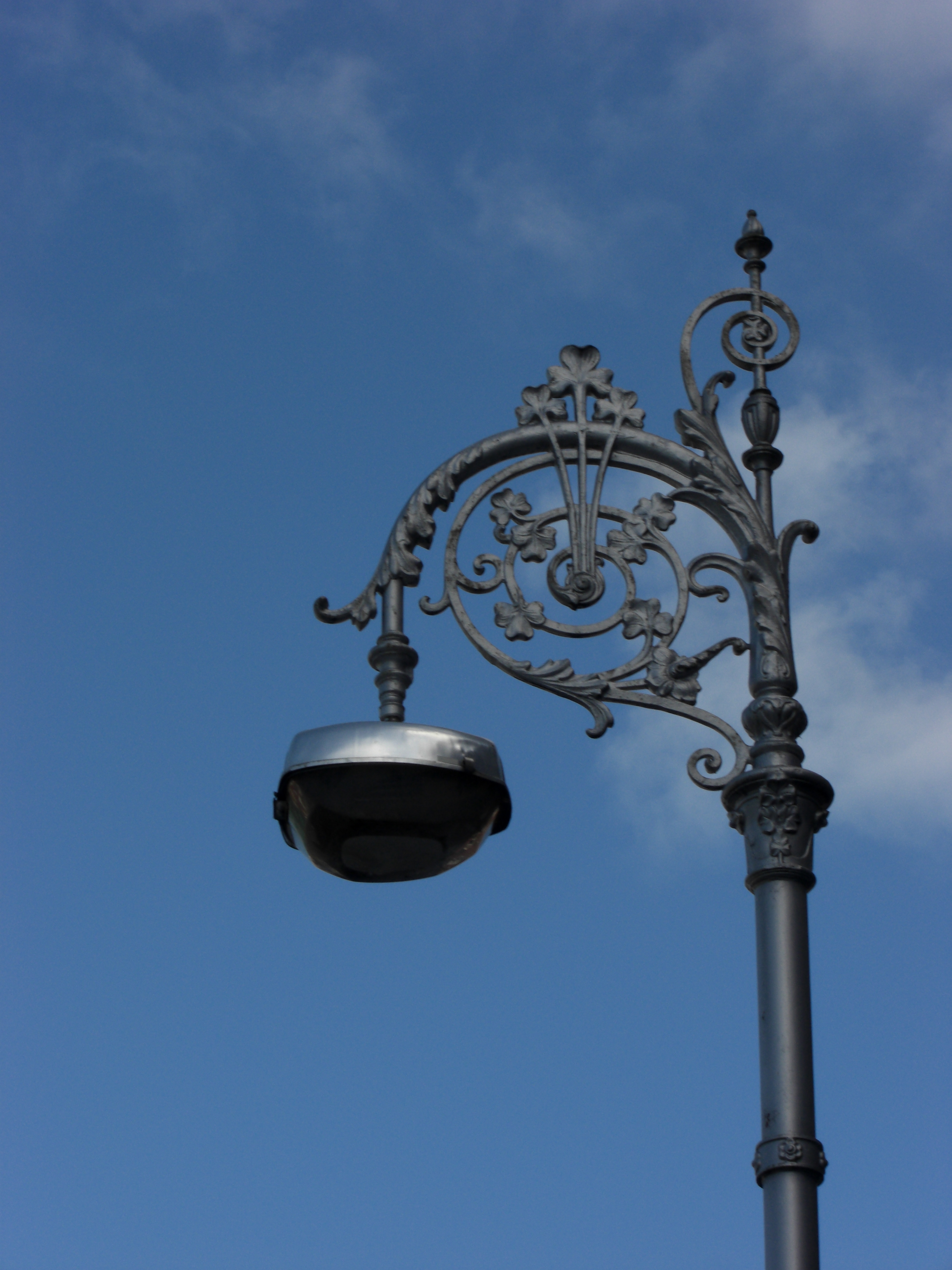
Lamppost in Mountjoy Square, Dublin, early 20th century

Design on Harp and Lion Bar, Listowel, County Kerry

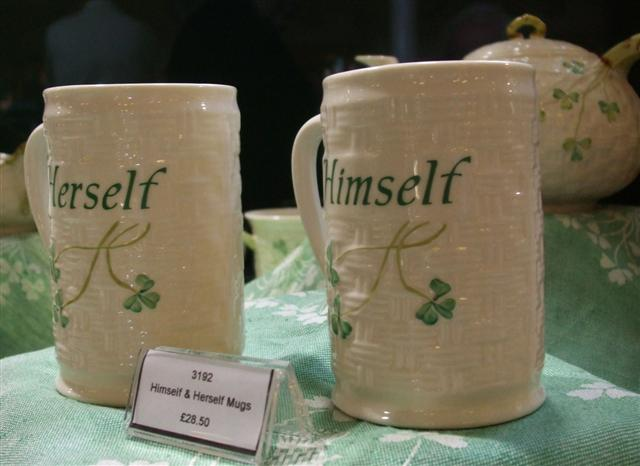
Work by Belleek Pottery, which often features shamrock motifs

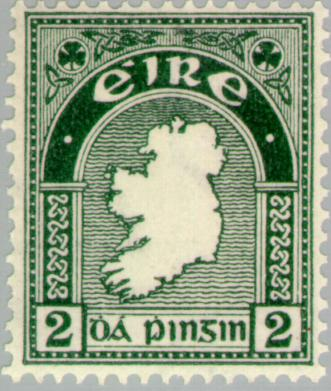
2d Map of Ireland: the first Irish postage stamp featured the shamrock.

The shamrock is used in the emblems of many state organisations, both in the Republic of Ireland and Northern Ireland. Some of these are all-Ireland bodies, (such as Tourism Ireland) as well as organisations specific to the Republic of Ireland (such as IDA Ireland) and Northern Ireland (such as Police Service of Northern Ireland). The Irish Postal Service An Post, regularly features the shamrock on its series of stamps. The airline Aer Lingus uses the emblem in its logos, and its air traffic control call sign is "SHAMROCK".

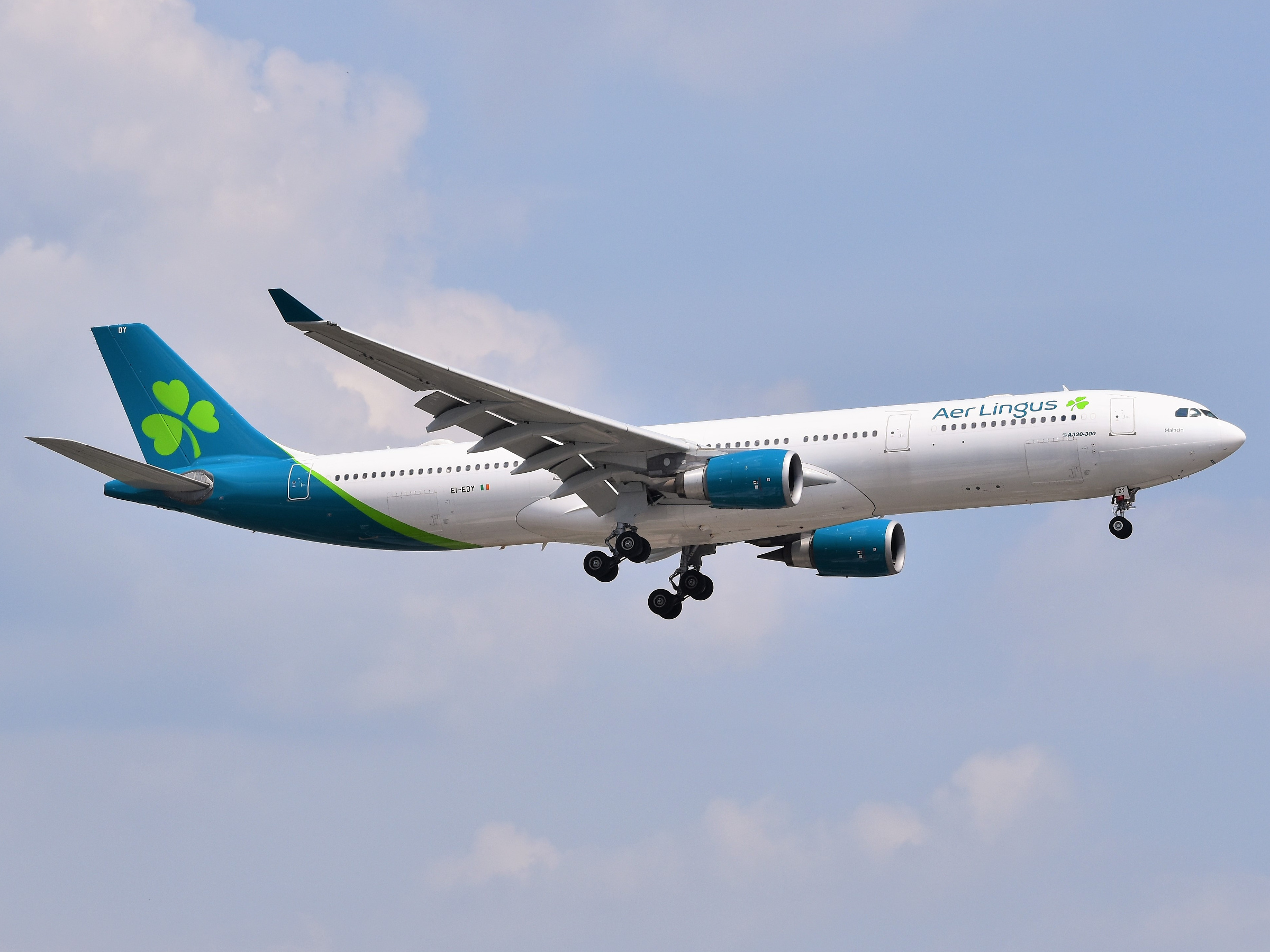
An Aer Lingus Airbus A330 with a shamrock on its tail fin

The shamrock has been registered as a trademark by the Government of Ireland. In the early 1980s, Ireland defended its right to use the shamrock as its national symbol in a German trademark case, which included high-level representation from Taoiseach Charles Haughey. Having originally lost, Ireland won on appeal to the German Supreme Court in 1985.

Since 1969, a bowl of shamrocks in a special Waterford Crystal bowl featuring a shamrock design is flown from Ireland to Washington, D.C., and presented to the President of the United States every St. Patrick's Day.

Shamrock is also used in emblems of UK organisations with an association with Ireland, such as the Irish Guards. Soldiers of the Royal Irish Regiment of the British Army use the shamrock as their emblem, and wear a sprig of shamrock on Saint Patrick's Day. Shamrock are exported to wherever the regiment is stationed throughout the world. Queen Victoria decreed over a hundred years ago that soldiers from Ireland should wear a sprig of shamrock in recognition of fellow Irish soldiers who had fought bravely in the Boer War, a tradition continued by British army soldiers from both the north and the south of Ireland following partition in 1921. The coat of arms on the flag of the Royal Ulster Constabulary George Cross Foundation was cradled in a wreath of shamrock.

The shamrock also appears in the emblems of a wide range of voluntary and non-state organisations in Ireland, such as the Irish Farmers Association, the Boy Scouts of Ireland association, Scouting Ireland Irish Girl Guides, and the Irish Kidney Donors Association. In addition many sporting organisations representing Ireland use the shamrock in their logos and emblems. Examples include the Irish Football Association (Northern Ireland), Irish Rugby Football Union, Swim Ireland, Cricket Ireland, and the Olympic Council of Ireland. A sprig of shamrock represents the Lough Derg Yacht Club Tipperary, (est. 1835). The shamrock is the official emblem of Irish football club Shamrock Rovers.

Flag of the Irish Rugby Football Union

Flag of Cricket Ireland

Ensign of the Lough Derg Yacht Club

Ensign of the Royal North of Ireland Yacht Club

Ensign of the Royal Western Yacht Club of Ireland

House flag of Irish Continental Line (1978–1988)

House flag of the Lord Line (Irish Shipowners Company)

== Use outside Ireland ==
Shamrocks commonly appear as part of the emblem of many organisations in countries overseas with communities of Irish descent. Outside Ireland, various organisations, businesses and places also use the symbol to advertise a connection with the island. These uses include:

- The shamrock features in the emblem of the Ancient Order of Hibernians, the largest and oldest Irish Catholic organisation. Founded in New York City in 1836 by Irish immigrants, it claims a membership of 80,000 in the United States, Canada and Ireland.
- The Emerald Society, an organisation of American police officers or fire fighters of Irish heritage, includes a shamrock on its badge. Emerald Societies are found in most major US cities such as New York City, Milwaukee, Jersey City, Washington, Boston, Chicago, San Francisco, Los Angeles and Saint Paul, Minnesota.
- The shamrock is featured in the "compartment" of the Royal Arms of Canada, as part of a wreath of shamrocks, roses, thistles, and lilies (representing the Irish, English, Scottish, and French settlers of Canada).
- The flag of the city of Montreal, Quebec, Canada has a shamrock in the lower right quadrant. The shamrock represents the Irish population, one of the four major ethnic groups that made up the population of the city in the 19th century when the arms were designed, the other three being the French (represented by a fleur-de-lis in the upper-left), the English (represented by a rose in the upper-right), and the Scots (represented by a thistle in the lower-left).
- The shamrock is featured on the passport stamp of Montserrat, many of whose citizens are of Irish descent.
- The shamrock signified the Second Corps of the Army of the Potomac in the American Civil War, which contained the Irish Brigade. It can still be seen on the regimental coat of arms of "The Fighting Sixty-Ninth"
- The Erin Go Bragh flag, used originally by the Saint Patrick's Battalion of the Mexican Army, uses an angelic Cláirseach, a medieval Irish harp, cradled in a wreath of clover. It is also used by many supporters of the football team Hibernian
- The crest of Glasgow Celtic Football Club originally included a shamrock which was changed in 1938 to a four leaved clover for reasons that remain unclear. The club was founded in 1888 in Glasgow among the poor Irish immigrants of the city.
- London Irish rugby football club has a shamrock on its crest. The club was founded in 1898 for the young Irishmen of London.
- The Shamrocks Motorcycle Club is a US-based traditional motorcycle club (composed of law enforcement personnel) which uses the shamrock as its name and symbol.
- The Boston Celtics, an American basketball team in the National Basketball Association (NBA), include shamrocks in both their main and alternate logos. Shaquille O'Neal, who played for the Celtics in his final NBA season, adopted the nickname "The Big Shamrock" during his time with the team.
- In Australia, the Melbourne Celtic Club features a shamrock on its emblem. The club was founded in 1887 for the Irish and other Celtic groups in the city.
- During the Russian Civil War a British officer Col. P.J. Woods, of Belfast, established a Karelian Regiment which had a shamrock on an orange field as its regimental badge.
- A shamrock (Trifylli) is the official emblem of Greek multi-sport club Panathinaikos A.O., Greek football club Acharnaikos F.C. and Cypriot sports club AC Omonia. A red shamrock is also the emblem of Platanias F.C., a Cretan football team of Chania.
- The Danish football club Viborg FF uses a shamrock in its badge and it has become a symbol of the town of Viborg.
- The German football club SpVgg Greuther Fürth also has a shamrock in its badge as it is a symbol of the city of Fürth.
- According to the Anti-Defamation League, the Aryan Brotherhood symbol combines a shamrock with a swastika.
Flag of St. Patrick's Battalion of the Mexican army reconstructed from description of Jon Riley

The Flag of Montreal. The shamrock is located in the lower right corner

AOH logo

Emblem of the Roman Catholic Archdiocese of Newark, New Jersey

Flag of Neuhausen am Rheinfall, Switzerland

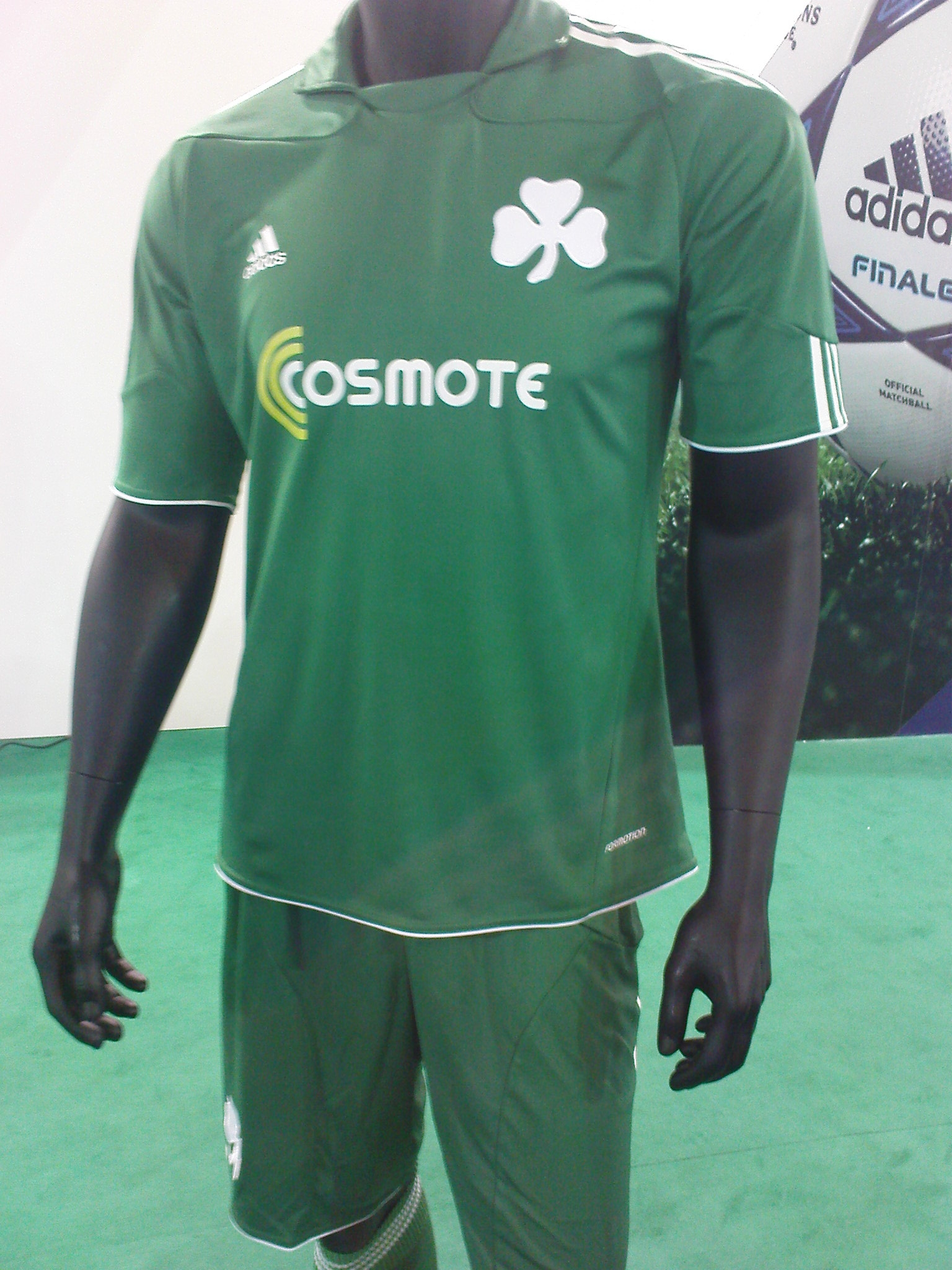
Panathinaikos F.C. shirt

== See also ==
- Guernsey lily
- Ragwort (Isle of Man)
- St. Patrick's blue
- Trefoil
