= Triple deity =

Three deities that are worshipped as one

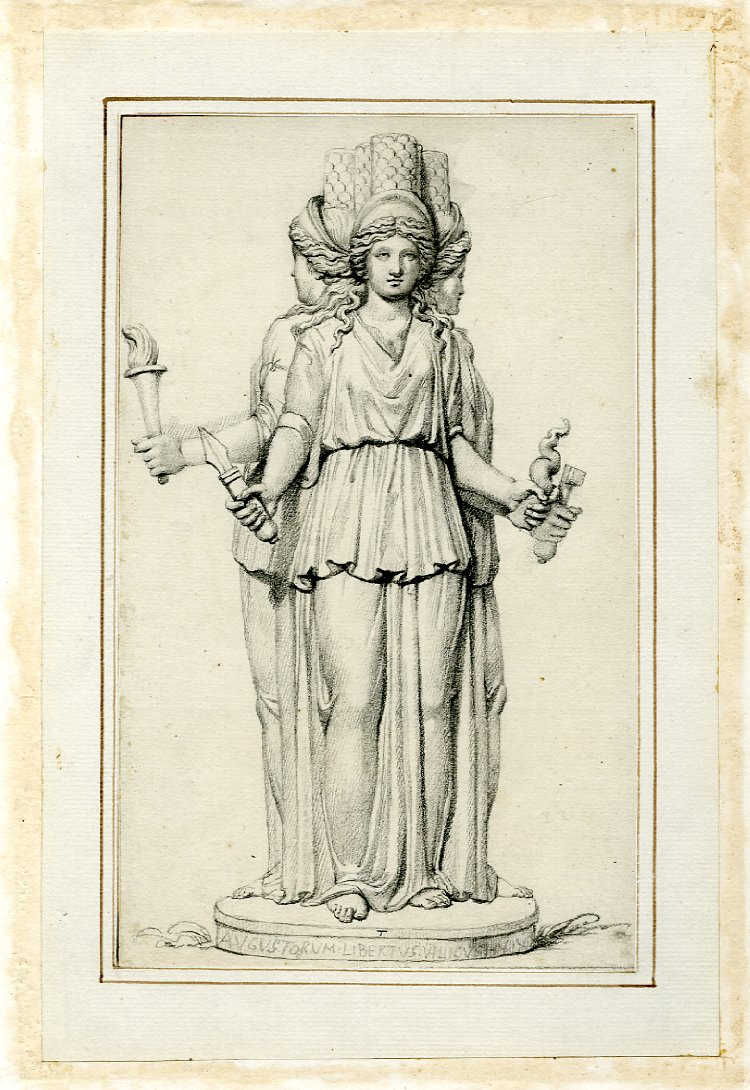
The Greek goddess Hecate portrayed in triplicate

A triple deity is a deity with three apparent forms that function as a singular whole. Such deities may sometimes be referred to as threefold, tripled, triplicate, tripartite, triune, triadic, or as a trinity. The number three has a long history of mythical associations and triple deities are common throughout world mythology. Carl Jung considered the arrangement of deities into triplets an archetype in the history of religion.

In classical religious traditions, three separate beings may represent either a triad who typically appear as a group (the Greek Moirai, the Roman Parcae, the Norse Norns, the Baltic Dēkla, Kārta and Laima, or the Irish Badb, Macha and Morrígan), or a single deity notable for having three aspects (Greek Hecate and Hellenistic Hermes Trismegistus). Trinitarian Christianity instead recognizes three "divine persons" in God the Father, the Son, and the Holy Spirit, which are usually distinguished from the idea of independent gods or aspects.

== Origins ==
Georges Dumézil proposed in his trifunctional hypothesis that ancient Indo-European society conceived of itself as structured around three activities: worship, war, and toil. As social structures developed, particular segments of societies became more closely associated with one of the three fundamental activities. These segments, in turn, became entrenched as three distinct "classes", each one represented by its own god. In 1970, Dumézil proposed that some goddesses represented these three qualities as different aspects or epithets. Interpreting various deities, including the Iranian Anāhitā and the Roman Juno, he identified what were, in his view, examples of this. Dumézil's trifunctional hypothesis proved controversial. Many critics view it as a modern imposition onto Indo-European religion rather than an idea present in the society itself.

Vesna Petreska posits that myths including trinities of female mythical beings from Central and Eastern European cultures may be evidence for an Indo-European belief in trimutive female "spinners" of destiny. However, according to the linguist M. L. West, various female deities and mythological figures in Europe show the influence of pre-Indo-European goddess-worship, and triple female fate divinities, typically "spinners" of destiny, are attested all over Europe and in Bronze Age Anatolia.

== Hinduism ==
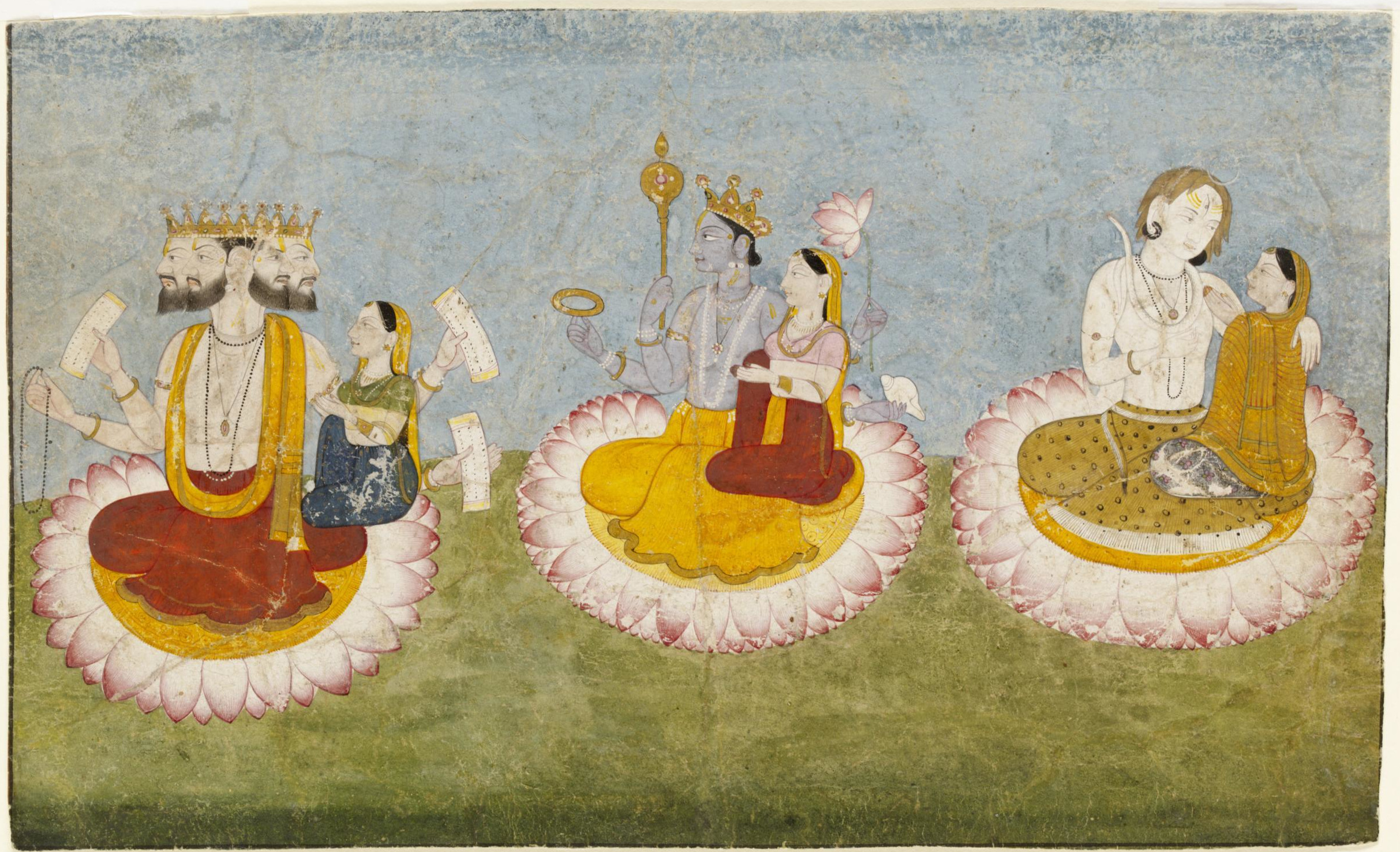
The Trimurti with their consorts.

The trinity of supreme divinity in Hinduism, in which the cosmic functions of creation, preservation, and destruction are personified as a triad of deities, is called Trimūrti (Sanskrit: त्रिमूर्ति 'three forms' or 'trinity'), where Brahma is considered the creator, Vishnu the preserver, and Shiva the destroyer.

The sacred symbol of Hinduism, the Om (or Aum), the sacred sound, syllable, mantra, and invocation, is considered to have an allusion to Trimurti, where the A, U, and M phonemes of the word are considered to indicate creation, preservation and destruction, the which the whole as representing the transcendent or absolute Brahman is added. It also indicates the three basic states of consciousness, in addition to which the whole syllable is interpreted as the subject of the consciousness, the self-principle (Ātman), which is considered to be identical with the Brahman.

The Tridevi is the trinity of goddess consorts for the gods in the Trimurti, typically personified by the Hindu goddesses Saraswati, Lakshmi, and Parvati. In Shaktism, these triune goddesses are considered the manifestations of Mahadevi, the Supreme Goddess (the female absolute), also known as Mula-Prakriti or Adi Parashakti.

== Antiquity ==
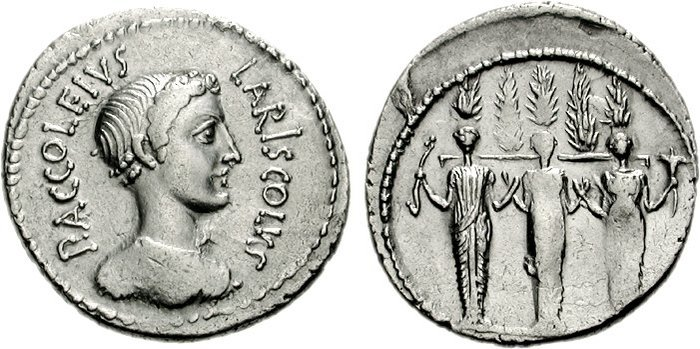
A first-century BC denarius (RRC 486/1) depicting the head of Diana and her triple cult statue

The Roman goddess Diana was venerated from the late sixth century BC as diva triformis, "three-form goddess", and early on was conflated with the similarly depicted Greek goddess Hekate. Andreas Alföldi interpreted a late Republican numismatic image as Diana "conceived as a threefold unity of the divine huntress, the Moon goddess and the goddess of the nether world, Hekate". This coin shows that the triple goddess cult image still stood in the lucus of Nemi in 43 BC. The Lake of Nemi was Triviae lacus for Virgil (Aeneid 7.516), while Horace called Diana montium custos nemoremque virgo ("keeper of the mountains and virgin of Nemi") and diva triformis ("three-form goddess"). In his commentary on Virgil, Maurus Servius Honoratus said that the same goddess was called Luna in heaven, Diana on earth, and Proserpina in hell.

Spells and hymns in Greek magical papyri refer to the goddess (called Hecate, Persephone, and Selene, among other names) as "triple-sounding, triple-headed, triple-voiced..., triple-pointed, triple-faced, triple-necked". In one hymn, for instance, the "Three-faced Selene" is simultaneously identified as the three Charites, the three Moirai, and the three Erinyes; she is further addressed by the titles of several goddesses. Translation editor Hans Dieter Betz notes: "The goddess Hekate, identical with Persephone, Selene, Artemis, and the old Babylonian goddess Ereschigal, is one of the deities most often invoked in the papyri."

E. Cobham Brewer's 1894 Dictionary of Phrase & Fable contained the entry, "Hecate: A triple deity, called Phoebe or the Moon in heaven, Diana on the earth, and Hecate or Proserpine in hell," and noted that "Chinese have the triple goddess Pussa". The Roman poet Ovid, through the character of the Greek woman Medea, refers to Hecate as "the triple Goddess"; the earlier Greek poet Hesiod represents her as a threefold goddess, with a share in earth, sea, and starry heavens. Hecate was depicted variously as a single womanly form; as three women back-to-back; as a three-headed woman, sometimes with the heads of animals; or as three upper bodies of women springing from a single lower body ("we see three heads and shoulders and six hands, but the lower part of her body is single, and closely resembles that of the Ephesian Artemis".)

The Olympian demiurgic triad in platonic philosophy was made up of Zeus (considered the Zeus [king of the gods] of the Heavens), Poseidon (Zeus of the seas) and Pluto/Hades (Zeus of the underworld). All were considered to be ultimately a monad; the same Zeus who gave rise to the Titanic demiurgic triad of Helios (the sun when in the sky), Apollo (the sun seen in the world of humankind), and Dionysus (god of mysteries, or the "sun" of the underworld), as in Plato's Phaedrus, concerning the myth of Dionysus and the Titans)

== Ancient Celtic cultures ==
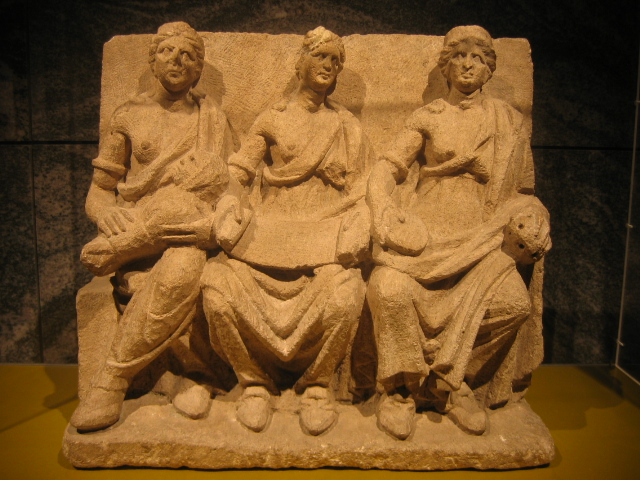
Terracotta relief of the Matres, from Bibracte, city of the Aedui in Gaul.

The Matres and Matronae are usually represented as a group of three but sometimes with as many as 27 (3 × 3 × 3) inscriptions. They were associated with motherhood and fertility. Inscriptions to these deities have been found in Gaul, Spain, Italy, the Rhineland and Britain, as their worship was carried by Roman soldiery dating from the mid-first to third century AD. Miranda Green observes that "triplism" reflects a way of "expressing the divine rather than presentation of specific god-types. Triads or triple beings are ubiquitous in the Welsh and Irish mythic imagery" (she gives examples including the Irish battle-furies, Macha, and Brigit). "The religious iconographic repertoire of Gaul and Britain during the Roman period includes a wide range of triple forms: the most common triadic depiction is that of the triple mother goddess" (she lists numerous examples).

In the case of the Irish Brigid it can be ambiguous whether she is a single goddess or three sisters, all named Brigid. The Morrígan also appears sometimes as one being, and at other times as three sisters, as do the three Irish goddesses of sovereignty, Ériu, Fódla and Banba.

== Christianity ==
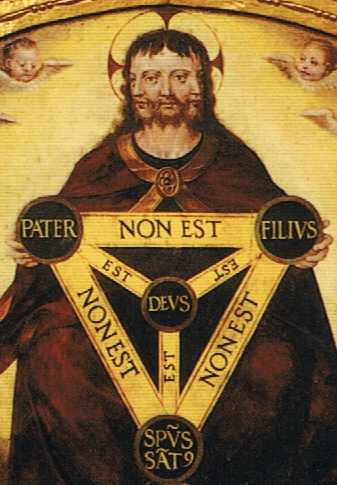
Renaissance painting by Jerónimo Cosida depicting the Christian Trinity, as a three faced head, accompanied by a Shield of the Trinity diagram.

Nicene Christians profess "one God in three divine persons" (God the Father, God the Son and God the Holy Spirit). This is not to be understood as a belief in (or worship of) three Gods, nor as a belief that there are three subjectively-perceived "aspects" in one God, both of which the Catholic Church condemns as heresy. The Catholic Church also rejects the notions that God is "composed" of its three persons and that "God" is a genus containing the three persons; neither confounding the persons, nor dividing the essence.

The c. fourth-century Gnostic text "Trimorphic Protennoia" presents a threefold discourse of the three forms of Divine Thought: the Father, the Son, and the Mother (Sophia). Micheus, Michar, and Mnesinous, the three heavenly spirits of baptism, also appear in various Sethian Gnostic texts.

Some Christian saints, especially martyrs, are trios who share a feast day or other remembrance. Whether they are subject to actual veneration and prayed to for supernatural aid, or simply honored, varies by Christian denomination.

=== Modalistic Monarchianism ===
Whereas Nicene Christians professes "one God in three divine persons" (God the Father, God the Son and God the Holy Ghost), Modalism is a form of Christian Unitarianism which stands in opposition to Trinitarianism and holds that the one God is also just one person, but appears in three different forms: the Father, Son, and Spirit. Modalism holds that the same one God appears in different forms throughout history. For example, Jesus was one form of the same God, and so Modalism holds that the "Father" suffered no less on the cross than did the "Son", as these are simply two names for one deity appearing in different forms. In addition, Modalism holds that the Holy Spirit is not a separate person from the Father either, but is a term that describes God in action. Modalism is considered a heresy in orthodox Christianity.

== Neopaganism ==
Symbol of Triple Goddess, composed of waxing crescent, full moon, and waning crescent

The Morrigan is an essential figure in Irish mythology, aspects of her and her trifold nature have been carried forwards into modern days Neo-Paganism she has close ties to witchcraft and the stages of womanhood being made up of: The Maiden- representing a persons early, more naïve life; The Mother- representing the middle stages of life when its important to protect and nurture others; The Crone- the older years of a woman's life after menopause. she may also have inspired Morgan le Fey of Arthurian myth

== See also ==
- Les Lavandières
- List of deities
- Lugh
- Mythography
- Samsin Halmoni
- Thraetaona
- Three hares
- Trichotomy (philosophy)
- Trifunctional hypothesis
- Triglav (mythology)
- Trita
- Triton
- Tritheism
