= The Hounds of the Morrigan =

1985 book by Pat O'Shea

- Cover of the original 1985 edition, as well as the 1999 reprint by HarperTrophy
- Author: Pat O'Shea
- Language: English
- Genre: Fantasy novel, Celtic mythology
- Publisher: Oxford University Press
- Publication date: 1985
- Publication place: United Kingdom
- Media type: Print (Hardback & Paperback)
- Pages: 688 pp
- ISBN: 0-06-447205-1
- OCLC: 39875090
- LC Class: PZ7.O83 Ho 1999

The Hounds of the Morrigan is a children's novel by the Irish writer Pat O'Shea. It was published in 1985, after taking thirteen years to complete. The novel recounts the adventures of 10-year-old Pidge and his younger sister, Brigit, battling with characters from Celtic mythology. It has been described by the novelist Anna Carey, writing in The Irish Times, as a "hilarious, scary fantasy novel ... possibly the greatest Irish children's book ever written".

== Plot ==
In a Galway bookshop, Pidge buys a book called A Book of Patrick's Writing and accidentally frees an evil serpent, Olc-Glas, from inside it. Pidge and his five-year-old sister, Brigit, are then caught up in a battle between good (the Dagda) and evil (the Morrigan). Talking animals and other figures from Celtic mythology help them, and they travel to Tír na nÓg.

== Setting ==
The Irish Times wrote that "the unspoilt countryside around Lough Corrib provided the inspiration" for the book.

== Links to Celtic mythology ==
- Queen Maeve, her husband, Ailill, and their seven sons, the Maines
- Cathbad
- The goddess Brigid
- Angus Og
- The Morrigan, a triple goddess, and her two counterparts:
  - Bodb, the Scald Crow
  - Macha, the Queen of Phantoms
- Saint Patrick
- The Dagda
- Cúchulainn

== Critical responses ==
Dave Langford reviewed The Hounds of the Morrigan for White Dwarf #93, calling it "A little kitchen-sinkish in its determined ransacking of Irish myth, but fun for young and old alike."

‘’The Bulletin of the Center for Children's Books’’ at the University of Chicago said that "The prose is rather relentlessly ornamented, but the images are always concrete and, like the narrative, have vigorous strength."

Imogen Russell Williams, writing in The Guardian nearly 30 years after the book's publication, described it as "a bravura feat of writing ... Its impossibly delicate balance of surreal humour and evoked beauty, knowledge, fearfulness, joy, and courage have never been bettered".

Joanne Hall, in Fantasy Faction, identified "a level of darkness in the book that would be surprising in a contemporary children’s novel ... one of the most unsettling sequences in the book occurs when the fleeing children are trapped inside the Morrigan’s giant thumbprint, a maze lined with nauseating blisters of sweat where nothing can live".

== Influence on other writers ==
Several writers have given The Hounds of the Morrigan as one of their favourite books or noted that it influenced them:

- Sarah Rees Brennan
- Roshani Chokshi
- Barry Hutchison
- Kieran Larwood
- Ruth Frances Long
- Katy Moran
- Emmet O'Cuana
- Sinéad O'Hart
- Laura Perry
- Taya Okerlund
- Robyn Young

== Sequel ==
O'Shea was working on a sequel at the time of her death. In an obituary, David Fickling wrote; "The few brilliant chapters of the unfinished sequel are almost worth publishing alone: a Christmas card scene, candelit shop windows, carol singers and a robin... and into this cheerful scene rides the great Irish witch the Morrigan with her wild sisters, bringing mayhem and magic and mischief".
