= The Morrígan =

Figure from Irish mythology

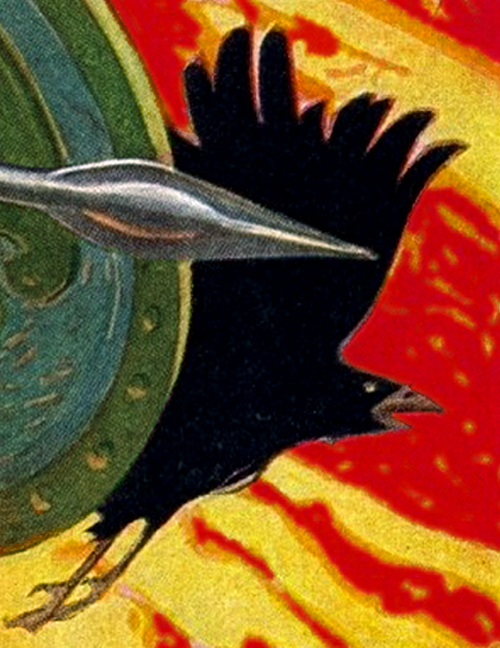
Detail from 1911 painting "Cú Chulainn" by J.C. Leyendecker. The Morrígan is depicted here as a crow.

The Morrígan or Mórrígan, also known as Morrígu, is a figure from Irish mythology. The name is Mór-ríoghan in modern Irish before the spelling reform, and it has been translated as "great queen" or "phantom queen".

The Morrígan is mainly associated with war and fate, especially with foretelling doom, death, or victory in battle. In this role she often appears as a crow, the badb. She incites warriors to battle and can help bring about victory over their enemies. The Morrígan encourages warriors to do brave deeds, strikes fear into their enemies, and is portrayed washing the bloodstained clothes of those fated to die. She is most frequently seen as a goddess of battle and war and has also been seen as a manifestation of the earth- and sovereignty-goddess, chiefly representing the goddess's role as guardian of the territory and its people.

The Morrígan is often described as a trio of individuals, all sisters, called "the three Morrígna". In mythology membership of the triad is given as Badb, Macha, and the Morrigan, who may be named Anu. It is believed that these were all names for the same goddess. In modern sources Nemain may also be named as one of the three Morrigan along with Badb and Macha, although her inclusion is unclear. The three Morrígna are also named as sisters of the three land goddesses Ériu, Banba, and Fódla. The Morrígan is described as the envious wife of The Dagda and a shape-shifting goddess, while Badb and Nemain are said to be the wives of Neit. She is associated with the banshee of later folklore.

== Etymology ==
There is some disagreement over the meaning of the Morrígan's name. Mor may derive from an Indo-European root connoting terror, monstrousness, cognate with the Old English maere (which survives in the modern English word "nightmare") and the Scandinavian mara and the Old East Slavic "mara" ("nightmare"); while rígan translates as "queen". This etymological sequence can be reconstructed in the Proto-Celtic language as *Moro-rīganī-s. Accordingly, Morrígan is often translated as "Phantom Queen". This is the derivation generally favoured in current scholarship.

In the Middle Irish period, the name is often spelled Mórrígan with a lengthening diacritic over the o, seemingly intended to mean "Great Queen" (Old Irish mór, "great"; this would derive from a hypothetical Proto-Celtic *Māra Rīganī-s). Whitley Stokes believed this latter spelling was due to a false etymology popular at the time. There have also been attempts by modern writers to link the Morrígan with the Welsh literary figure Morgan le Fay from the Matter of Britain, in whose name mor may derive from the Welsh word for "sea", but the names are derived from different cultures and branches of the Celtic linguistic tree.

== Sources ==
=== Glosses and glossaries ===
The earliest sources for the Morrígan are glosses in Latin manuscripts and glossaries (collections of glosses). The 8th century O'Mulconry's Glossary says that Macha is one of the three morrígna. In a 9th-century manuscript containing the Vulgate version of the Book of Isaiah, the word Lamia is used to translate the Hebrew Lilith. A gloss explains this night hag as "a monster in female form, that is, a morrígan." Cormac's Glossary (also 9th century), and a gloss in the later manuscript H.3.18, both explain the plural word gudemain ("spectres") with the plural form morrígna.

=== Ulster Cycle ===
The Morrígan's earliest narrative appearances, in which she is depicted as an individual, are in stories of the Ulster Cycle, where she has an ambiguous relationship with the hero Cú Chulainn. In the Táin Bó Regamna ("The Cattle Raid of Regamain"), Cú Chulainn encounters the Morrígan, but does not recognise her, as she drives a heifer from his territory. In response to this perceived challenge, and his ignorance of her role as a sovereignty figure, he insults her. But before he can attack her she becomes a black bird on a nearby branch. Cú Chulainn now knows who she is, and tells her that had he known before, they would not have parted in enmity. She notes that whatever he had done would have brought him ill luck. To his response that she cannot harm him, she delivers a series of warnings, foretelling a coming battle in which he will be killed. She tells him, "It is at the guarding of thy death that I am; and I shall be."

In the Táin Bó Cúailnge ("The Cattle Raid of Cooley"), Queen Medb of Connacht launches an invasion of Ulster to steal the bull Donn Cuailnge; the Morrígan, like Alecto of the Greek Furies, appears to the bull in the form of a crow and warns him to flee. Cú Chulainn defends Ulster by fighting a series of single combats at fords against Medb's champions. In between combats, the Morrígan appears to him as a young woman and offers him her love and her aid in the battle, but he rejects her offer. In response, she intervenes in his next combat, first in the form of an eel who trips him, then as a wolf who stampedes cattle across the ford, and finally as a white, red-eared heifer leading the stampede, just as she had warned in their previous encounter. However, Cú Chulainn wounds her in each form and defeats his opponent despite her interference. Later, she appears to him as an old woman bearing the same three wounds that her animal forms had sustained, milking a cow. She gives Cú Chulainn three drinks of milk. He blesses her with each drink, and her wounds are healed. He regrets blessing her for the three drinks of milk, which is apparent in the exchange between the Morrígan and Cú Chulainn: "She gave him milk from the third teat, and her leg was healed. 'You told me once,' she said,'that you would never heal me.' 'Had I known it was you,' said Cú Chulainn, 'I never would have.'" As the armies gather for the final battle, she prophesies the bloodshed to come.

In one version of Cú Chulainn's death-tale, as Cú Chulainn rides to meet his enemies, he encounters the Morrígan as a hag washing his bloody armour in a ford, an omen of his death. Later in the story, mortally wounded, Cú Chulainn ties himself to a standing stone with his own entrails so he can die upright, and it is only when a crow lands on his shoulder that his enemies believe he is dead.

=== Mythological Cycle ===
The Morrígan also appears in texts of the Mythological Cycle. In the 12th-century poetic compilation Lebor Gabála Érenn ("The Book of the Taking of Ireland"), she is listed among the Tuatha Dé Danann as one of the daughters of Ernmas, granddaughter of Nuada.

The first three daughters of Ernmas are given as Ériu, Banba, and Fódla. Their names are synonyms for "Ireland", and they were respectively married to Mac Gréine, Mac Cuill, and Mac Cécht, the last three Tuatha Dé Danann kings of Ireland. Associated with the land and kingship, they probably represent a triple goddess of sovereignty. Next come Ernmas' other three daughters: Badb, Macha, and the Morrígan. A quatrain describes the three as wealthy, "springs of craftiness", and "sources of bitter fighting". The Morrígu's name is also said to be Anand. According to Geoffrey Keating's 17th-century History of Ireland, Ériu, Banba, and Fódla worshipped Badb, Macha, and the Morrígan respectively.

The Morrígan also appears in the Cath Maige Tuired ("The Battle of Magh Tuireadh"). On Samhain, she keeps a tryst with the Dagda before the battle against the Fomorians. When he meets her, she is washing herself, standing with one foot on either side of the river Unius, near Riverstown, Co. Sligo. In some sources, she is believed to have created the river. After they have sex, the Morrígan promises to summon the magicians of Ireland to cast spells on behalf of the Tuatha Dé, and to destroy Indech, the Fomorian king, taking from him "the blood of his heart and the kidneys of his valour." Later, we are told, she would bring two handfuls of his blood and deposit them in the same river (however, we are also told later in the text that Indech was killed by Ogma).

As battle is about to be joined, the Tuatha Dé leader, Lug, asks each what power they bring to the battle. The Morrígan's reply is difficult to interpret, but involves pursuing, destroying and subduing. When she comes to the battlefield, she chants a poem, and immediately the battle breaks and the Fomorians are driven into the sea. After the battle, she chants another poem celebrating the victory and prophesying the end of the world.

In another story, she lures away the bull of a woman named Odras. Odras then follows the Morrígan to the Otherworld, via the cave of Cruachan, which is said to be her "fit abode." When Odras falls asleep, the Morrígan turns her into a pool of water that feeds into the River Shannon. In this story, the Morrigan is called the Dagda's envious queen, fierce of mood. She is also called a "shape-shifter" and a cunning raven caller whose pleasure was in mustered hosts.

== Nature and role ==
The Morrígan is often considered a triple goddess, but this triple nature is ambiguous and inconsistent. These triple appearances are partially due to the Celtic significance of threeness. Sometimes she appears as one of three sisters, the daughters of Ernmas: Morrígan, Badb and Macha. Sometimes the trinity consists of Badb, Macha and Anand, collectively known as the Morrígna. Occasionally, Nemain or Fea appear in the various combinations. However, the Morrígan can also appear alone, and her name is sometimes used interchangeably with Badb.

The Morrígan is mainly associated with war and fate, and is often interpreted as a "war goddess". W. M. Hennessy's The Ancient Irish Goddess of War, written in 1870, was influential in establishing this interpretation. She is said to derive pleasure from mustered hosts. Her role often involves premonitions of a particular warrior's violent death, suggesting a link with the banshee of later folklore. This connection is further noted by Patricia Lysaght: "In certain areas of Ireland this supernatural being is, in addition to the name banshee, also called the badhb". Her role was to not only be a symbol of imminent death, but to also influence the outcome of war. Most often, she did this by appearing as a crow flying overhead, and would either inspire fear or courage in the hearts of the warriors. In some cases, she is written to have appeared in visions to those who are destined to die in battle as washing their bloody armour. In this specific role, she is also given the role of foretelling imminent death with a particular emphasis on the individual. There are also a few rare accounts where she would join in the battle itself as a warrior and show her favouritism in a more direct manner.

The Morrígan is also associated with the land and animals, particularly livestock. Máire Herbert argues that "war per se is not a primary aspect of the role of the goddess." Herbert suggests that "her activities have a tutelary character. She oversees the land, its stock and its society. Her shape-shifting is an expression of her affinity with the whole living universe." Patricia Lysaght notes that the Cath Maige Tuired depicts the Morrígan as "a protectress of her people's interests" and associates her with both war and fertility. According to Proinsias Mac Cana, the goddess in Ireland is "primarily concerned with the prosperity of the land: its fertility, its animal life, and (when it is conceived as a political unit) its security against external forces." Likewise, Maria Tymoczko writes, "The welfare and fertility of a people depend on their security against external aggression," and notes that "warlike action can thus have a protective aspect." It is therefore suggested that the Morrígan is a manifestation of the earth- and sovereignty-goddess, chiefly representing the goddess' role as guardian of the territory and its people. She can be interpreted as providing political or military aid, or protection to the king—acting as a goddess of sovereignty, not necessarily of war.

It has also been suggested that she was closely linked to the fianna, and that these groups may have been in some way dedicated to her. These were "bands of youthful warrior-hunters, living on the borders of civilized society and indulging in lawless activities for a time before inheriting property and taking their places as members of settled, landed communities." If true, her worship may have resembled that of Perchta groups in Germanic areas.

There is a burnt mound site in County Tipperary known as Fulacht na Mór Ríoghna ("cooking pit of the Mórrígan"). The fulachtaí sites are found in wild areas, and are usually associated with outsiders such as the fianna, as well as with the hunting of deer. There may be a link with the three mythical hags who cook the meal of dogflesh that brings the hero Cú Chulainn to his doom. The Dá Chích na Morrígna ("two breasts of the Mórrígan"), a pair of hills near Brú na Bóinne in County Meath, suggest to some a role as a tutelary goddess, comparable to Anu, who has her own hills, Dá Chích Anann ("the breasts of Anu") in County Kerry. Other goddesses known to have similar hills are Áine and Grian of County Limerick who, in addition to a tutelary function, also have solar attributes.

== Arthurian legend ==
There have been attempts by some modern researchers and authors of fiction to link the Morrígan with the character of Morgan, the latter often being depicted in the legend as a fairy or otherwise supernatural sister of King Arthur. Morgan first appears in literature in Geoffrey of Monmouth's 12th-century Vita Merlini as a goddess-like figure in no blood relation to Arthur, whom she takes to her Otherworld style land of Avalon following his mortal wound in a battle. In some Arthurian texts, such as Sir Gawain and the Green Knight, Morgan is portrayed as a hag whose actions set into motion a bloody trail of events that lead the hero into numerous instances of danger. Morgan is also depicted as a seductress, much like the older legends of the Morrígan, and has numerous lovers whom she might even abduct for this purpose (as in some stories of Lancelot and Ogier the Dane, among others). The character is frequently depicted as wielding power over others to achieve her own purposes, allowing those actions to play out over time, to the benefit or detriment of other characters.

However, while the creators of the literary character of Morgan may have been somewhat inspired by the much older tales of the goddess, the relationship likely ends there. Scholars such as Rosalind Clark hold that the names are unrelated, the Welsh "Morgan" (Wales being the original source of the Matter of Britain) being derived from root words associated with the sea, while the Irish "Morrígan" has its roots either in a word for "terror" or a word for "greatness".

== See also ==
- Baba Yaga
- Bean-nighe
- Clíodhna
- Mongfind
- Scáthach
- The Hounds of the Morrigan
