= Bánánach =

Mythical creature in Irish folklore and legend

In early Irish folklore, the bánánach (Irish: [ˈbˠaːnˠaːnˠax], English: /ˈbɑːn.ɑːn.əx/) were preternatural beings, described as spectres which haunted battlefields. They are mentioned alongside the bócanach,(/ˈboʊk.ən.əx/, "goat-like battle spectre") the geniti glinne (/ˈɡɛn.tiː/ /ˈɡlɛn.ɛ/ "female battle-spectre of the glen") , and the demna aeóir (/ˈdʒm.nə/ /ˈeɪ.oʊɪr/ ,"demons of the air") in the Táin Bó Cúalnge.

In the Táin Bó Cúalnge, the bánánach, bócanach, and geniti glinne are sent by the Tuatha Dé Danann strike fear into Cú Chulainn's enemies, answering to his battle cry. They are linked with (and sometimes considered personifications of) the sounds of battle, being used as a way to describe the sound of weapons clashing. All three of these beings are warded off by the Dond Cúalnge, a legendary bull mentioned in the Táin Bó Cúalnge.

== See also ==
- Badb
- Banshee
