= Cruinniuc =

Figure in Irish mythology

Cruinniuc (Crunniuc, Cruinn, Crundchu, Crunnchu, Cronnchu) is a wealthy cattle-owner of Ulster in the Ulster Cycle of Irish mythology. A widower, he is surprised when a beautiful woman turns up at his house, sleeps with him and takes care of his children, without revealing her name. She becomes pregnant by him.

Later, at a festival, he boasts that his wife could run faster than the king's chariot. The king hears his boast, and his heavily pregnant wife is forced to race against his chariot. She wins, and gives birth to twins on the finish line. She reveals her name is Macha, daughter of Sainrith mac Imbaith, and the capital of Ulster is thereafter called Emain Macha ("Macha's Twins"). She curses the men of Ulster to suffer her labour pains in the hour of their greatest need, which is why none of the Ulstermen but Cúchulainn is able to fight in the Táin Bó Cuailnge (Cattle Raid of Cooley).
