= Sovereignty goddess =

Goddess who confers authority on a king

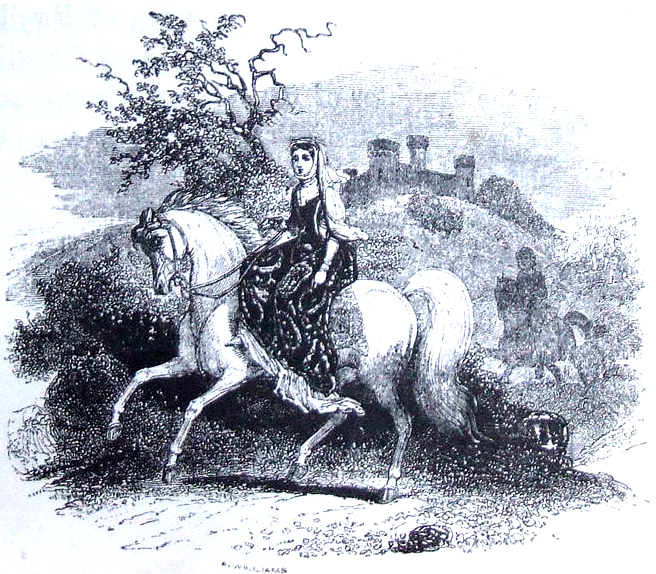
In some modern research on Welsh Mythology, Rhiannon has been characterised as a Sovereignty Goddess. Her choice to marry Pwyll is seen as giving him and his descendants a natural right to rule over the Kingdom of Dyfed.

Sovereignty goddess is a scholarly term, almost exclusively used in Celtic studies (although parallels for the idea have been claimed in other traditions, usually under the label hieros gamos). The term denotes a goddess who, personifying a territory, confers sovereignty upon a king by marrying or having sex with him. Some narratives of this type correspond to folk-tale motif D732, the Loathly Lady, in Stith Thompson's Motif-Index. This trope has been identified as 'one of the best-known and most frequently studied thematic elements of Celtic myth'. It has also, however, been criticised in recent research for leading to "an attempt to prove that every strong female character in medieval Welsh and Irish tales is a souvenir of a Celtic sovereignty goddess".

== Historical evidence ==
There is some evidence in Greek and Roman accounts of historical Celtic women that leading women such as Camma and Cartimandua might in antiquity actually have been associated with goddesses. It is also clear that medieval Irish rituals inaugurating a new king sometimes took the form of a banais ríghe ('wedding-feast of kingship'), because the king was imagined symbolically to be marrying his dominion, and that similar rituals known by the term feis might involve both sexual activity, and horses (in turn evoking the idea, prominent in modern scholarship, of Celtic horse-goddesses). Most luridly, Giraldus Cambrensis, in his 1188 Topographia Hibernica, claimed that at the inauguration of the king of the Cenél Conaill, the successor to the kingship publicly sexually embraced a white mare. This would then be slaughtered and cooked into a broth in which the king bathed, before he and his people drank it.

However, the type-text for the idea of the sovereignty goddess is the medieval Irish Echtra Mac nEchach ('the adventures of the sons of Eochaid'), in which a hideously ugly woman offers the young men water in return for a kiss. Only Niall kisses her with conviction, and moreover has sex with her, whereupon the woman becomes beautiful and utters the verse

Translation:

King of Tara, I am the sovereignty [Old Irish: in flaithes];
I will tell you its great benefit.
[It will belong] to your descendants forever, above every kindred;
that is the true reason for which I speak.

The story is transparently a pseudo-history composed in support of the claim of the Uí Néill dynasty to dominance in Ireland.

== In Medieval literature ==
Following the Christianisation of the modern Celtic nations, the Sovereignty Goddess remained a powerful aspect of Medieval Welsh literature and the oral traditions in both Wales and Ireland. Following the Conquest of Wales in the thirteenth century, the Goddess Rhiannon found new relevance as a well known figure who survived a war, endured unjust punishments and as a mother figure who had lost her children, she came to serve as an inspiration to the Welsh people in the wake of finally losing their own sovereignty. Rhiannon's grace in the loss of her queenship served as an example to her people, shapeshifting from a noblewoman to workhorse and offering service to the visitors while never losing sight of the truth and the sovereignty within herself.

== Criticism ==
The fairly strong evidence for a tradition of sovereignty goddesses in early Ireland has led to a fashion in Celtic scholarship for interpreting other female characters as euhemerised sovereignty goddesses, or for arguing that the portrayals of women have been influenced by traditions of sovereignty goddesses.

This way of reading medieval Celtic female characters goes back to the 1920s, and is related to the myth and ritual school of scholarship. For example, the protagonist of the Welsh Canu Heledd is sometimes read in this way, and figures as diverse as Guenevere; the Cailleach Bhéirre; Medb; Rhiannon; warrior women such as the Morrígan, Macha and Badb; and the loathly lady of Chaucer's Wife of Bath's Tale have been viewed in the same light. Britta Irslinger has argued that female characters in early Irish literature whose names relate to ruling or the supernatural, or who have been named after kingdoms, originate as sovereignty goddesses, whereas those whose names relate to drink or some other benefit of the hall were queens.

However, recent scholarship has tended to criticise these assumptions, in both medieval Irish and related material. For example, the portrayals of Gormflaith ingen Donncadha (d. 861), Gormflaith ingen Flann Sinna (c. 870–948), and Gormflaith ingen Murchada (960–1030) have all been read as showing influence from the idea of the sovereignty goddess, but this has been shown to rest on little evidence. Likewise the role of the Empress of Constantinople, who appears in the Middle Welsh Peredur but not in its French source, has been found to be open to other readings. Even where female characters might historically owe something to traditions of sovereignty goddesses, reading them primarily through this lens has been argued to be limiting and reductive.

== See also ==
- Marriage of the Sea ceremony – Ceremony performed in the Republic of Venice

== Studies ==
- Sjoestedt, Marie-Louise. 1949. Gods and Heroes of the Celts, translated by Myles Dillon. London: Methuen
- Breatnach, R. A. 1953. “The Lady and the King: A Theme of Irish Literature.” Studies: An Irish Quarterly Review 42 (167): 321–36.
- Mac Cana, Proinsias. 1955, 1958–1959. “Aspects of the Theme of King and Goddess in Irish Literature.” Études celtiques 7: 76–144, 356–413; 8: 59–65.
- Bhreathnach, Máire. 1982. “The Sovereignty Goddess as Goddess of Death?” Zeitschrift für celtische Philologie 39 (1): 243–60.
- Lysaght, Patricia. 1986. The Banshee: The Irish Death Messenger. Dublin: O’Brien Press. pp. 191–218.
- Herbert, Máire. 1992. “Goddess and King: The Sacred Marriage in Early ireland.” In Women and Sovereignty, edited by Louise Olga Fradenburg, 264–75. Edinburgh: University of Edinburgh Press.
- Eichhorn-Mulligan, Amy C. 2006. “The Anatomy of Power and the Miracle of Kingship: The Female Body of Sovereignty in a Medieval Irish Kingship Tale.” Speculum 81 (4): 1014–54.
- Gregory Toner, Manifestations of Sovereignty in Medieval Ireland, H. M. Chadwick Memorial Lectures, 29 (Cambridge: Department of Anglo-Saxon, Norse and Celtic, University of Cambridge, 2018), ISBN 9781909106215.
