= Ernmas =

Irish mother goddess

- Mother goddess
- Texts: Lebor Gabála Érenn

Genealogy
- Parents: Etarlam
- Consorts: Cailitin
- Children: Ériu; Banba; Fódla; Badb; Macha; Mórrígan; Fiacha; Ollom; Coscar; Glonn; Gnim

Ernmas is an Irish mother goddess, mentioned in Lebor Gabála Érenn and "Cath Maige Tuired" as one of the Tuatha Dé Danann. She is the daughter of Etarlam, a son of Nuada Airgetlam. Her daughters include the trinity of eponymous Irish goddesses Ériu, Banba and Fódla and the trinity of war goddesses the Badb, Macha and Mórrígan. Some sources say that she had the latter three with the wizard Cailitin. She also had a trinity of sons, Glonn, Gnim, and Coscar. Her other sons are Fiacha and Ollom. She was killed during the first battle of Mag Tuired. Ernmas may have also been an agriculture deity, as she is referred to as "the she-farmer" in the Lebor Gabála Érenn.
