= Ériu =

Goddess in Irish mythology

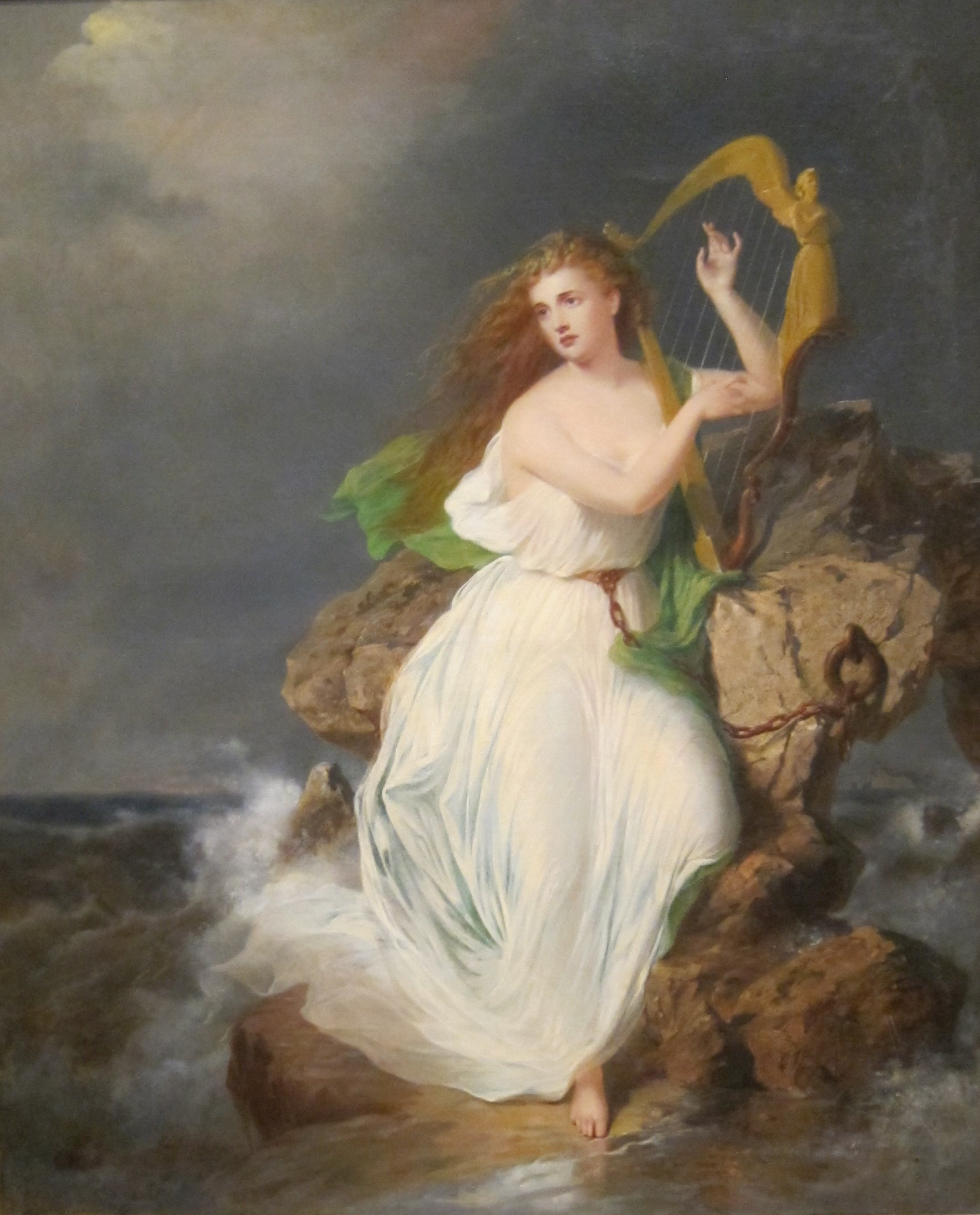
″The Harp of Erin″ painting by Thomas Buchanan Read

In Irish mythology, Ériu (Old Irish: [ˈeːɾʲu]; Modern Irish: Éire [ˈeːɾʲə]), daughter of Delbáeth and Ernmas of the Tuatha Dé Danann, was the eponymous matron goddess of Ireland.

The English name for Ireland comes from the name Ériu and the Germanic (Old Norse or Old English) word land.

Since Ériu is represented as goddess of Ireland, she is often interpreted as a modern-day personification of Ireland, although since the name Ériu is the Old Irish form of the word Ireland, her modern name is often modified to Éire or Erin to suit a modern form.

== Name and etymology ==
The name Ériu has been derived from reconstructed Archaic Irish *Īweriū, which is related to the ethnic name Iverni. The University of Wales derives this from Proto-Celtic *Φīwerjon- (nominative singular Φīwerjō). This is further derived from Proto-Indo-European *piHwerjon- ("fertile land" or "land of abundance"), from the adjective *piHwer- "fat" (cognate with Ancient Greek píeira and Sanskrit pīvara, "fat, full, abounding").

The Archaic Irish form was borrowed into Ancient Greek as Ἰέρνη Iernē and Ἰουερνία Iouernia, and into Latin Hibernia.

== Epithets ==
In the Banshenchas (a mediaeval text describing legendary and historical Irish women), Ériu and her sisters are called:

- fair women of the Tuatha Dé Danand
- a famous throng
- clear voice of achievement
- three fair daughters of Fiachra
- bright women of spirited speech

== Family ==
Different texts attribute differing personal relationships to Ériu. Ériu's sisters are consistently named as Banba and Fódla, who are members of the Tuatha Dé Danann, and the three sisters share a trio of brothers as husbands. In the Banshenchas, Ériu is described as the wife of Cetar, while Banba and Fódla are named as the wives of Etar and Detar, respectively. More commonly, she is named as the wife or lover of Mac Gréine ("Son of the Sun"), a grandson of the Dagda, although in the Banshenchas, her husband is simply named Grian ("Sun"). Ériu is also portrayed as the lover of Elatha, a prince of the Fomorians, with whom she produces a son named Bres, and as the mistress of Bres's enemy - the hero Lugh. Both Elatha and Ériu are described in some sources as the children of Delbaeth, indicating they may be half-siblings. Elsewhere Ériu is named as the daughter of Fiachra, and her mother is named as Ernmas. Her foster-father in the Rennes Dindsenchas is named as Codal the Roundbreasted, and when he fed Ériu on a peak called Benn Codail, it caused the land in Ireland to heave toward the sky, and it would have kept rising until the entire land would have been the peak or otherwise until the sun would have scorched Ériu and the wind pierced her ears.

== Role and mythical portrayal ==
With her sisters, Banba and Fódla, Ériu forms a triumvirate of goddesses. When the Milesians arrived from Galicia, each of the three sisters asked that her name be given to the country. This was granted to them, although Ériu (Éire) became the chief name in use. (Banba and Fódla are still sometimes used as poetic names for Ireland, much as Albion is used as a poetic name for Great Britain.)

According to the 17th-century Irish historian Geoffrey Keating (Irish: Seathrún Céitinn), the three sovereignty goddesses associated with Éire, Banbha and Fódla were Badb, Macha and The Morrígan. Ériu, Banba and Fódla are also interpreted as goddesses of sovereignty.

== Bibliography ==
- Boydell, Barra. "The female harp: The Irish harp in 18th- and early–19th-century Romantic nationalism", RIdIM/RCMI newsletter XX/1 (spring 1995), 10–17.
