= Pat O'Shea (author) =

Patricia O'Shea
- Born: 22 January 1931; Galway, Ireland
- Died: 3 May 2007 (aged 76); Manchester, UK
- Occupation: author

Pat O'Shea (22 January 1931 – 3 May 2007) was an Irish children's fiction writer. She was born in Galway and was the youngest of five children. Her first novel was the best-selling The Hounds of the Morrigan, which took 13 years to complete. It was finally published in 1985 by Oxford University Press, translated into five languages, and is still considered a classic of children's literature.

== Biography ==
O'Shea was born in the Bohermore area of Galway and attended Presentation National School and the Convent of Mercy Secondary School. She was the youngest of five children. Her mother died when O'Shea was a small child, and she and the other children were brought up by her older sister.

At 16 she followed her siblings to England and decided to stay there, getting a job in a bookshop in Manchester. She began to write theatre plays and received a bursary in 1967 from the British Art Council.

Her writing for the theatre was supported by David Scase, director of the Library Theatre, Manchester, and his successor Tony Colegate, and four of her one-act plays were produced by the Library Theatre. Her play The King's Ears was commissioned by BBC Northern Ireland. In 1971 she worked on a sketch comedy show for Granada Television called Flat Earth, but this was not successful.

In 1969 she had begun to write short stories and poetry, as well as a comic novel (unpublished). By the early 1970s she began writing The Hounds of the Morrigan to please herself and family and friends, with little expectation of getting it published. It took O'Shea ten years to complete her novel. By 1985, it had already been translated into several languages.

In poor health by the time of that novel's first sudden success, she completed only a few chapters of the unpublished sequel in the subsequent decades, although her obituary in The Guardian calls these "brilliant".

In 1988 O'Shea published a second children's book, Finn Mac Cool and the Small Men of Deeds, through the publisher Holiday. It was a retelling of folklore tales, illustrated by Stephen Lavis. In 1987 Horn Book Magazine included it in their annual list of notable children's books, giving it a Horn Book Fanfare Best books of the year award.

In 1999 she published her third (and final) book, The Magic Bottle (Scholastic). It was also illustrated by Lavis.

She married JJ (Jack) O'Shea in 1953, but they separated in 1962. They had one son, Jim. Pat O'Shea died in Manchester in 2007, at age 76.

== Published books ==
Title	Date	Publisher	ISBN	Notes
The Hounds of the Morrigan	1985	Oxford University Press	0-06-447205-1	
Finn MacCool and the Small Men of Deeds	1987	Oxford	0-19-274134-9	Retold by Pat O'Shea; Illustrated by Stephen Lavis
The Magic Bottle	1999	Scholastic	0-590-11350-X	Retold by Pat O'Shea; Illustrated by Steve Lavis
