= Horse goddess =

The term Horse goddess may refer to one of several mythological goddesses:

- Epona, the horse goddess in Celtic and Gallo-Roman mythology
- Rhiannon, the horse goddess in Welsh mythology
- Étaín, identified as a horse goddess in some versions of Irish Mythology
- Gontia (deity), a Celtic goddess
