= Badb =

Deity

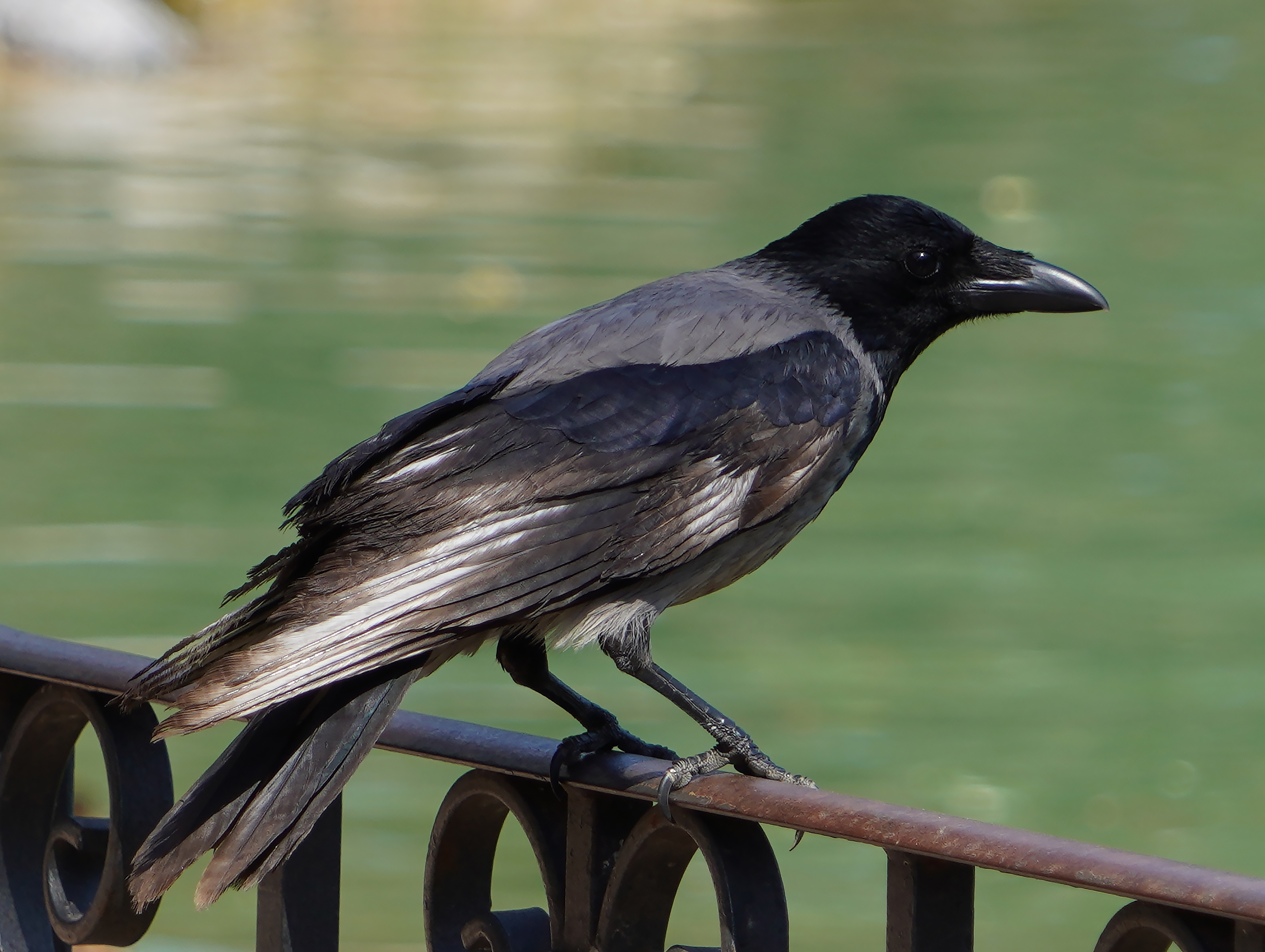
Badb would commonly take the form of the hooded crow.

In Irish mythology, the Badb (Old Irish, pronounced [baðβ]), or in modern Irish Badhbh (Irish pronunciation: [bˠəu], Munster Irish: [bˠəiw])—also meaning 'crow'—is a war goddess who takes the form of a crow, and is thus sometimes known as Badb Catha ('battle crow'). She is known to cause fear and confusion among soldiers to move the tide of battle to her favoured side. Badb may also appear before a battle to foreshadow the extent of the carnage or to predict the death of a notable person. She sometimes does this through wailing cries, leading to comparisons with the bean-sídhe (banshee).

With her sisters, Macha and the Morrigan or Anand, Badb is one of a trio of war goddesses known as the three Morrígna.

== Representations in legends ==
In Irish legends, Badb is associated with war and death, appearing either to foreshadow imminent bloodshed or to participate in battles, where she creates confusion among the soldiers. As a harbinger of doom, she appears in a number of different guises. In Togail Bruidne Dá Derga, she takes the form of an ugly hag who prophesies Conaire Mór's downfall. She appears in a similar guise in Togail Bruidne Dá Choca to foretell the slaying of Cormac Condloinges, as well as taking the form of a "washer at the ford"—a woman washing Cormac's chariot and harness in a ford in what was considered an omen of death. The cries of Badb may also be an ill omen: Cormac's impending death is foreshadowed with the words "The red-mouthed badbs will cry around the house, / For bodies they will be solicitous" and "Pale badbs shall shriek". In this role she has much in common with the bean-sídhe.

She was also regularly depicted as an active participant in warfare; indeed, the battlefield was sometimes referred to as "the garden of the Badb". During the First Battle of Mag Tuired, Badb—along with her sisters, Macha and Morrígan—fights on the side of the Tuatha Dé Danann. Using their magic, the three sisters incite fear and confusion among the Fir Bolg army, conjuring "compact clouds of mist and a furious rain of fire" and allowing their enemies "neither rest nor stay for three days and nights". Badb plays a similar role in the Táin Bó Cúailnge, terrorising and disorienting the forces of Queen Medb and causing many to fall on their own weapons. She would often take the form of a screaming raven or crow, striking fear into those who heard her, and could also be heard as a voice among the corpses on a battlefield.

Following the defeat of the Fomorians by the Tuatha Dé Danann in the Second Battle of Mag Tuired, Badb (or the Morrígan daughter of Ernmas) instead of predicting doom, now sings a prophecy celebrating the victory and a time of peace,

Middle Irish [819-820]	Modern English
Sith co nem. Nem co doman. Doman fo ním, nert hi cach, án forlann, lan do mil, mid co saith. Sam hi ngam...	Peace up to heaven. Heaven down to earth. Earth beneath heaven, Strength in each, A cup very full, Full of honey; Mead in abundance. Summer in winter...

Then she delivers a prophecy of the eventual end of the world, "foretelling every evil that would be therein, and every disease and every vengeance. Wherefore then she sang this lay below.":

Middle Irish [831-832,833,837-840]	Modern English
Ni accus bith nombeo baid: sam cin blatha, beti bai cin blichda, mna can feli fir gan gail. Gabala can righ... feda cin mes. Muir can toradh. sen saobretha. Brecfásach mbrithiom- braithiomh cech fer. Foglaid cech mac. Ragaid mac i lligie a athar. Ragaid athair a lligi a meic. Cliamain cach a brathar. Ni sia nech mnai assa tigh... olc aimser immera mac a athair, imera ingen...	I shall not see a world which will be dear to me: Summer without blossoms, Cattle will be without milk, Women without modesty, Men without valour. Conquests without a king... Woods without mast. Sea without produce... False judgements of old men. False precedents of lawyers, Every man a betrayer. Every son a reaver. The son will go to the bed of his father, The father will go to the bed of his son. Each his brother's brother-in-law. He will not seek any woman outside his house... An evil time, Son will deceive his father, Daughter will deceive...

== Kinship ==
Badb is often identified as one of the Morrígna, a trio of Irish war goddesses, although there exist a number of conflicting accounts on this subject. In Lebor Gabála Érenn, Badb, Macha and Morrígan make up the Morrígna trinity and are named as daughters of the farming goddess Ernmas. According to this version, she is also the sister of Ériu, Banba and Fódla, the three matron goddesses of Ireland, who give their names to the land.

Lebor Gabála Érenn also states that Badb is one of the two wives of the war god Neit. Less commonly, she has been described as the wife of the Fomorian king Tethra.

=== Similar deities ===
In her role as a terrifying battlefield goddess and harbinger of doom, Badb closely resembles Nemain. Like Badb, Nemain is identified as a wife of Neit. Writers have sometimes used their names interchangeably, suggesting that they may in fact be a single goddess. On the other hand, W. M. Hennessy notes that Badb and Nemain were said to have different sets of parents, suggesting that they may not be entirely identical figures.

Badb also appears to be closely related to the Gaulish goddess Catubodua, or Bodua.

== Etymology ==
Pointing to variants such as Irish badhbh 'hoodie crow, a fairy, a scold,' Early Irish badb, 'crow, demon,' Badba, Welsh bod, 'kite,' the Gaulish name Bodv-, in Bodvo-gnatus and the Welsh name Bodnod, Macbain (1982) suggests *bodwā- as the Proto-Celtic ancestral form. However, Julius Pokorny (1959:203) suggests *badwā- on the basis of similar data. Both MacBain (1982) and Julius Pokorny (1959:203) correlate the element with Norse böð, genitive boðvar, 'war,' and Anglo-Saxon beadu, genitive beadwe, 'battle,' suggesting that the word originally denoted 'battle' or 'strife.' Julius Pokorny (1959:203) presents the element as an extended form of the Proto-Indo-European root *bhedh- 'pierce, dig.' To this root Pokorny also links the Sanskrit bádhate, 'oppress,' and the Lithuanian bádas, 'famine'.

W. M. Hennessy argues that the word bodb or badb originally meant rage, fury, or violence, and came to mean a witch, fairy, or goddess, represented in folklore by the scald-crow, or royston-crow. Peter O'Connell's 1819 Irish Dictionary defines the Badb as a "bean-sidhe, a female fairy, phantom, or spectre, supposed to be attached to certain families, and to appear sometimes in the form of squall-crows, or royston-crows" and badb-catha as "Fionog, a royston-crow, a squall crow". Other entries relate to her triple nature: "Macha, i. e. a royston-crow; Morrighain, i. e. the great fairy; Neamhan, i. e. Badb catha nó feannóg; a badb catha, or royston-crow."

== See also ==
- Boa Island
- Clídna
- Irish mythology in popular culture
- Mongfind
