= Banba =

Irish goddess

- Fertility, Mother goddess
- Member of Tuatha Dé Danann
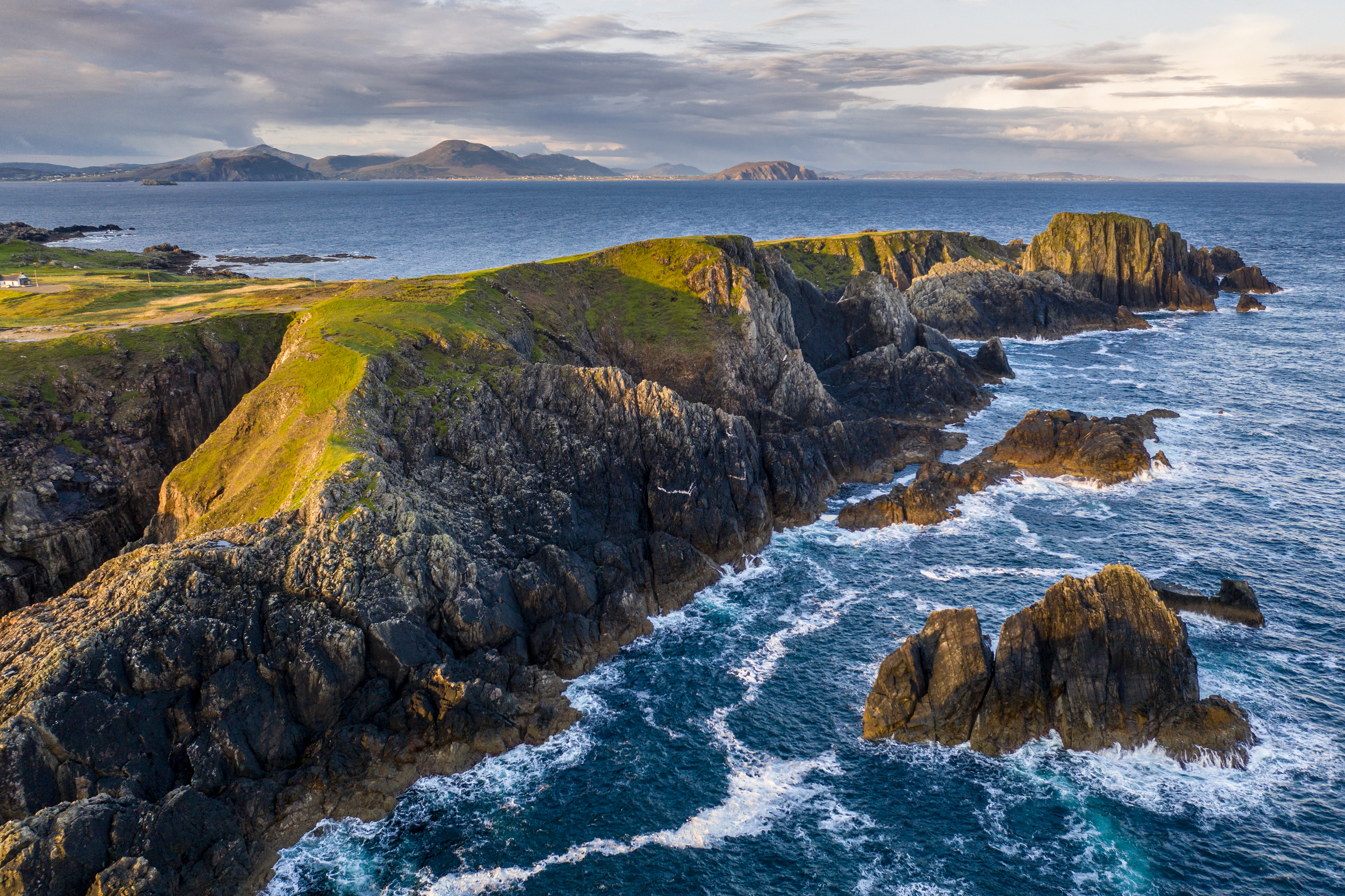
- Malin Head, locally known as Banba's Crown
- Other names: Banbha
- Animals: Pig
- Associated deities: Fódla, Ériu

Genealogy
- Spouse: Mac Cuill

In Irish mythology, Banba (modern spelling: Banbha [ˈbˠanˠəwə]), daughter of Delbáeth and Ernmas of the Tuatha Dé Danann, is a matron goddess of Ireland. She was married to Mac Cuill, a grandson of the Dagda.

Banba was the first of the three goddesses to welcome the Milesians, the other two being, Fódla and Ériu. She offered the Milesians happiness and wealth if they named the land after her. They passed her by, and later met Fódla, who offered the same thing, and Ériu, who said they would live happily if they named the land after her. Some versions of the myth say that the Milesians banished her by singing spells. According to Seathrún Céitinn she worshipped Macha, who is also sometimes named as a daughter of Ernmas. Céitinn also refers to a tradition that Banbha was the first person to set foot in Ireland before the flood, in a variation of the legend of Cessair.

In the Tochomlad mac Miledh a hEspain i nErind: no Cath Tailten, it is related that as the Milesians were journeying through Ireland, "they met victorious Banba among her troop of faery magic hosts" on Senna Mountain, the stony mountain of Mes. A footnote identifies this site as Slieve Mish in Chorca Dhuibne, County Kerry. The soil of this region is a non-leptic podzol.

Pigs are sometimes considered to be a symbol of Banba. The name Banba is similar to banb, the Irish word for piglet, and pigs were heavily associated with prosperity in Ireland.

The name Banba is sometimes used as a poetic term for the island of Ireland. In addition to her mythic associations with Munster and Leinster, the goddess Banba is strongly associated with Malin Head in Ulster, which is locally referred to as Banba's Crown.

The LÉ Banba (CM11), a ship in the Irish Naval Service, was named after her.
