= Fódla =

Irish mythological goddess

- Goddess of the Land
- Affiliation: Tuatha Dé Danann
- Ethnic group: Irish

Genealogy
- Parents: Delbáeth (father); Ernmas (mother)
- Siblings: Banba and Ériu
- Spouse: Mac Cecht

In Irish mythology, Fódla or Fótla (modern spelling: Fódhla, Fodhla, Fóla), daughter of Delbáeth and Ernmas of the Tuatha Dé Danann, is one of the tutelary goddesses of Ireland. Her husband is Mac Cecht. Her name, pronounced [ˈfˠoːl̪ˠə] (FOE-lah), is believed to derive from Old Irish fót ('sod, land'), indicating her nature as a goddess of the land. A fanciful etymology in the Book of Leinster reads it as fót for Díl, "a sod upon Díl," memorialising the death of a daughter of Míl Espáine.

With her sisters, Banba and Ériu, she is part of an important triumvirate of goddesses. When the Milesians arrived from Spain, each of the three sisters asked the bard Amergin that her name be given to the country. Ériu (Éire, and in the dative 'Éirinn', giving English 'Erin') seems to have won the argument, but the poets hold that all three were granted their wish. Thus Fódhla and Banba are sometimes used as literary names for Ireland, similar to the use of the poetic name 'Albion' for Great Britain.

In the Tochomlad mac Miledh a hEspain i nErind, Fótla is described as the wife of Mac Cecht, reigning as Queen of Ireland in any year in which Mac Cecht ruled as king. The text goes on to relate that as the Milesians were journeying through Ireland, Fótla met them ‘with her swift fairy hosts around her’ on Naini Mountain, also called the mountain of Ebliu. A footnote identifies the Naini Mountain of Ebliu as the Slieve Felim Mountains in County Limerick.

In De Situ Albanie (a late document), the Pictish Chronicle, and the Duan Albanach, Fotla (modern Atholl, Ath-Fotla) was the name of one of the first Pictish kingdoms.

Fódla declined in popularity as a given name over the centuries, but became more popular in Ireland in the 2010s and 2020s, increasing from fewer than five baby girls in either the Republic of Ireland or Northern Ireland in the mid 2010s to 28 in the Republic and 20 in the North in 2025 (including its alternative spellings, Fódhla, Fodhla and Fodla).

== See also ==
- Irish mythology in popular culture
