= John O'Hart =

Irish historian and genealogist

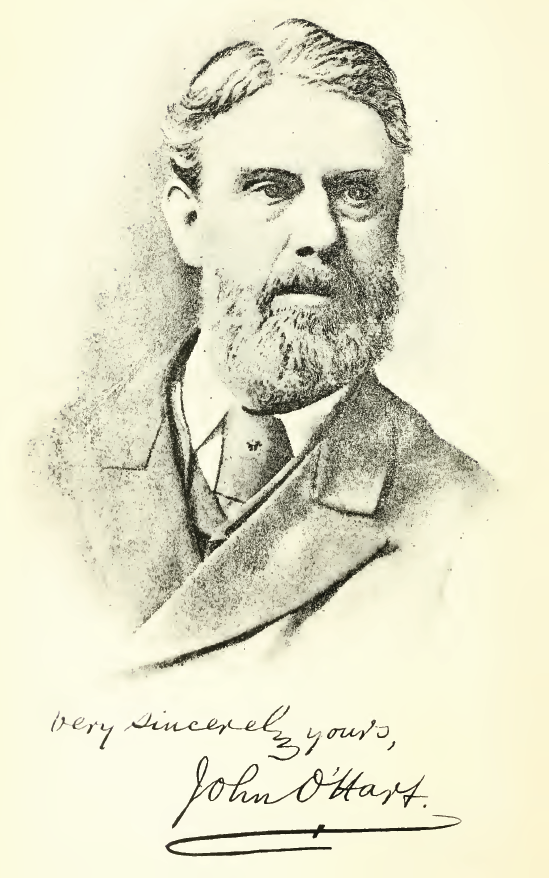
A sketch of John O'Hart first published in Irish pedigrees; or, The origin and stem of the Irish nation (1892), by John O'Hart, - Volume: 1.

John O'Hart (Irish: Seán Ó hAirt; 1824–1902) was an Irish historian and genealogist. He is noted for his work on ancient Irish lineage.

He was born in Crossmolina, County Mayo, Ireland. A committed Roman Catholic and Irish nationalist, O'Hart had originally planned to become a priest but instead spent two years as a police officer. He was an Associate in Arts at the Queen's University, Belfast. He worked at the Commissioners of National Education during the years of the Great Famine. He worked as a genealogist and took an interest in Irish history. He died in 1902 in Clontarf near Dublin, at the age of 78.

O'Hart's 800-page, The Irish and Anglo-Irish landed gentry (Dublin 1884), was reprinted in 1969, with an introduction by Edward MacLysaght, the first Chief Herald of Ireland. Another work, Irish pedigrees; or, The origin and stem of the Irish nation, first published in 1876, has come out in several subsequent editions.

To complete his genealogies he used the writings of Cú Choigcríche Ó Cléirigh, Dubhaltach Mac Fhirbhisigh and O'Farrell, along with the Annals of the Four Masters, for the medieval pedigrees. He used the works of Bernard Burke, John Collins and others to extend his genealogies past the 17th century.

== Stem of the Irish nation ==
In his Irish Pedigrees, O'Hart presents the legendary origins of the Irish people, from the Biblical Adam and Eve through the kings of ancient Ireland. Irish tradition holds that every Irish person is descended from the king Milesius who emigrated from Spain in approximately 1700 BC, according to the Annals of the Four Masters. O'Hart started each of his genealogies with Adam, recording Milesius as his 36th descendant.

From the start;
(1) Adam, his son
(2) Seth, his son
(3) Enos, his son
(4) Cainan, his son
(5) Mahalaleel, his son
(6) Jared, his son
(7) Enoch, his son
(8) Methuselah, his son
(9) Lamech, his son
(10) Noah, his son
(11) Japhet, his son
(12) Magog, his son
(13) Baoth, "to whom Scythia came has his lot", his son
(14) Phoeniusa Farsaidh (Fénius Farsaid) King of Scythia, his son
(15) Niul, his son
(16) Gaodhal (Gathelus), his son
(17) Asruth, his son
(18) Sruth (who fled Egypt to Creta), his son
(19) Heber Scut (returned to Scythia), his son
(20) Beouman, King of Scythia, his son
(21) Ogaman King of Scythia, his son
(22) Tait King of Scythia, his son
(23) Agnon (who fled Scythia by sea with the majority of his people), his son
(24) Lamhfionn (who led his people to Gothia or Getulia, where Carthage was afterwards built), his son
(25) Heber Glunfionn, King of Gothia, his son
(26) Agnan Fionn King of Gothia, his son
(27) Febric Glas King of Gothia, his son
(28) Nenuall King of Gothia, his son
(29) Nuadhad King of Gothia, his son
(30) Alladh King of Gothia, his son
(31) Arcadh King of Gothia, his son
(32) Deag King of Gothia, his son
(33) Brath, King of Gothia (who left Gothia with a large band of his people and settled in Galicia, Spain), his son
(34) Breoghan, King of Galicia, Andalusia, Murcia, Castile, and Portugal, his son
(35) Bile, King of Galicia, Andalusia, Murcia, Castile, and Portugal, and his son
(36) Galamh (also known as Milesius of Spain), King of Galicia, Andalusia, Murcia, Castile, and Portugal.

According to O'Hart's account, Milesius had four sons, Heber, Ir, Heremon, and Amergin, who were involved, with their uncle Ithe, in the invasion of ancient Ireland; Milesius, himself, had died during the planning. Amergin was killed by his brother Heremon after the war because of a disagreement with his brother on how the island should be governed. It is from the four other invaders — Heber, Ir, Heremon, and Ithe — from whom the Irish are alleged to descend. These, according to O'Hart, are the four lines from which all true Irish descend. Conn of the Hundred Battles was a descendant of Erimon, and Brian Boru was descended from both Heber and Conn.

== Sources ==
Irish pedigrees; or, The origin and stem of the Irish nation (1892), by John O'Hart, is available in 2 volumes free on the Internet Archive.

Irish pedigrees; or, The origin and stem of the Irish nation (1892), by John O'Hart, - Volume: 1
archive.org/details/irishpedigreesor_01ohar

Irish pedigrees; or, The origin and stem of the Irish nation (1892), by John O'Hart, - Volume: 2
archive.org/details/irishpedigreesor02ohar

Another book by John O'Hart is also available free on the Internet Archive.

The Irish landed gentry when Cromwell came to Ireland (1887), by John O'Hart;
archive.org/details/irishlandedgentr00ohar
