= Eber Donn =

Eber Donn or Emer Don may refer to:

- Éber Donn mac Míled, a son of Míl Espáine
- Éber Donn mac Ír, a grandson of Míl Espáine

== See also ==
- Eber Finn
- Érimón
