= Éber Donn =

Irish mythological figure

In Irish mythology, Éber Donn ("Eber the brown" or "the noble") is the eldest son of Míl Espáine, the mythical ancestor of the Irish people. Unlike his brothers, Eremon, Éber Finn and Amergin, Éber Donn was unable to land in Ireland, and was killed by a shipwreck off the island's southwest coast. As reported by Lebor Gabála Érenn, Éber Donn slighted the goddess Ériu, who predicted that neither he nor his offspring would land safely on the soil of Ireland. He was buried by his brothers in Tech Duinn, a rocky island off the Irish coast.

According to one interpretation Éber Donn would be a continuation of the Celtic deity of death Donn, since both are connected with Tech Duinn, a place commonly identified with Bull Rock, a rocky islet off the coast of the Beara Peninsula.

Another Éber Donn, Éber Donn mac Ír, the nephew of the previous, is considered the progenitor of the kings of Ulaid and Dalriada.
