= Bile (Irish legend) =

Legendary ancestor of the Irish people

Bilé is a character in the Lebor Gabála Érenn, a medieval Christian history of Ireland and the Irish (or Gaels), and in the genealogies of John O'Hart that are based on this tradition. He is described as a king of Galicia, an ancestor of the Gaels, the son of Breogán, and the father of Milesius.

The Lebor Gabála purports to be an account of the Gaels' descent from Adam through the sons of Noah and how they came to Ireland. The tale relates that the Gaels spent 440 years wandering the Earth and underwent a series of tribulations. Eventually, the Gaels sailed to Iberia and conquered it. There, one of their leaders, Breogán, founded a city called Brigantia and built a great tower. From the top of the tower, his son Íth glimpses Ireland. The Gaels—including some of Breogán's sons—sailed to Ireland from Brigantia and took it from the Tuatha Dé Danann, the Irish pagan gods.

Brigantia likely refers to A Coruña in Galicia (which was then known as Brigantium) and Breogán's tower is likely based on the Tower of Hercules (which was built at A Coruña by the Romans) or the Tower of Babel. The idea that the Irish Gaels came from Iberia may be based on the similarity of the names Iberia and Hibernia and the names Galicia and Gael.

Bilé is listed as the father of Fuat, a son who travelled to Inis Magdana, Moagdéda, or Mor-Oc Diada ("Great Young Divine"), an island where no man could tell a lie; Fuat brought a piece of sod from Inis Mor-Oc Diada back to Ireland, which he placed under his seat of judgement, and which turned upside-down whenever he spoke a lie.

In pre-Christian tradition, Bilé was a god, speculated to be a god of the dead, as well as the word for a sacred tree used in coronation ceremonies. This version of Bilé is often considered the consort of Danu and the father of the gods and of all humanity.

== See also ==
- Donn - Irish death god and mythological ancestor of the Gaels.
