= Lámfhind =

Mythical son of Agnoman

Lámfhind (Old Irish "White Hand"), son of Agnoman, (not the same Agnoman who was the father of Nemed) was, according to medieval Irish historical traditions, a mythical ancestor of the Milesians, who are said to have settled Ireland from the Iberian Peninsula and from whom the lineages of most of the traditional High Kings were traced.

In the Lebor Gabála Érenn Lámfhind is called a "violent warrior" who had radiant hands that gave off light like candles that permitted the ships to travel by day and night. He was the brother of Allot and one of the three chieftains of the Milesians along with his brother Allot and their druid Caicher.

According to the Lebor Gabála Érenn, the descendants of Goídel Glas, the eponymous ancestor of the Gaels, migrated from Egypt around the time of the Biblical Exodus, and settled in Scythia. Several generations later they were expelled from Scythia after Agnoman killed Refloir, the Scythian king, and spent the next seven years wandering by sea in three ships lashed together. After Agnoman died on the Caspian Sea, Lámfind took leadership of the exiles, along with his brother Allot and their cousin Caicher the druid. Caicher protected his people from the song of the Sirens by melting wax into their ears, (like Odysseus had done) and prophesied that in 300 years their descendants would settle in Ireland. Lámfhind led them to settle in the Macotic Marshes (Gothia, according to Geoffrey Keating), where he had a son, Eber Glúnfhind. Eight generations later his descendant Brath would lead his people from there to Spain, where Brath's son Breogán would spy Ireland from the top of a tower.
