= Cessair =

Cessair or Cesair (Modern Irish: Ceasair, meaning 'sorrow, affliction') is a character from a medieval Irish origin myth, best known from the 11th-century chronicle text Lebor Gabála Érenn. According to the Lebor Gabála, she was the leader of the first inhabitants of Ireland, arriving before the Biblical flood. The tale may have been an attempt to Christianise an earlier pagan myth.

== Overview ==
According to the Lebor Gabála, Cessair was the daughter of Noah's non-Biblical son Bith and his wife Birren. Cessair's father's name, 'Bith', is derived from the proto-Celtic Bitu-, which can mean "world", "life", or "age" (cf. Bituitus).

In some versions of the tale, Noah tells them to go to the western edge of the world to escape the coming flood. In other versions, after being denied a place on Noah's Ark, Cessair tells her people to create an idol to advise them. This idol tells them to escape the flood by sailing to Ireland. They set out in three ships and reach Ireland after a long journey. However, when they attempt to land, two of the ships are lost. The only survivors are Cessair, forty-nine other women, and three men: Fintan mac Bóchra, Bith, and Ladra.

According to the Annals of the Four Masters, they landed in Ireland at Dún na mBarc on Bantry Bay forty days before the flood, in Age of the World 2242. According to Seathrún Céitinn's chronology, they arrived in 2361 BC.

The tale continues with the women being shared evenly among the men. Each man had one woman as his primary wife: Fintán with Cessair, Bith with Bairrfhind, Ladra with Alba. Bith and Ladra soon die, and Fintán is left with all of the women. However, he is unable to cope and flees to a cave in the mountains. Fintán is the only survivor when the Flood eventually comes. He shapeshifts into a one-eyed salmon, then an eagle, and then finally a hawk. He lives for 5,500 years after the flood, becomes a man again, and recounts Ireland's history to the High King Diarmait mac Cerbaill. Fintán is thus similar to the character Tuan mac Cairill.

According to legend, Cessair died at Cúil Ceasra(ch) in Connacht and a cairn, Carn Ceasra(ch), was raised over her body. It has been speculated that this cairn is near Boyle in County Roscommon, or that it is Cnoc Meadha in County Galway.

== Other versions ==
Archaeologist J. P. Mallory has a different version of the tale, in which there are 150 women and three men. The first man dies and is buried in Wexford. The second man then has 100 women and soon dies of exhaustion. The 150 women chase the remaining man, who saves himself by jumping into the sea and turning into a salmon.

An earlier version of the tale, allegedly found in the Cín Dromma Snechtai, says that the first woman in Ireland was Banba. She arrived with her two sisters, Fódla and Ériu, three men, and fifty women. Banba, Fódla, and Ériu were a trio of Irish land goddesses. Their husbands were Mac Cuill (son of hazel), Mac Cecht (son of the plow), and Mac Gréine (son of the Sun), respectively. It is likely that Cessair, Bairrfhind, and Alba are Christianized replacements for the three goddesses and that Fintán, Bith, and Ladra are replacements for the three gods. Fintán/Mac Cuill may also be linked to the Salmon of Knowledge, which gains all the world's knowledge after eating nine hazelnuts that fell into a well. The women who accompany Cessair appear by their names to represent the world's ancestral mothers. They included 'Alba' (British), 'German' (Germans), 'Espa' (Spanish), 'Triage' (Thracians), 'Gothiam' (Goths), and so forth. Thus "their arrival can be read as creating a microcosm of the whole world's population in Ireland". Several other companions echo the names of ancient Irish goddesses.

Seathrún Céitinn also refers to a legend in which three fishermen from Iberia—Capa, Lavigne, and Luasad—were driven to Ireland by a storm a year before the flood. They liked Ireland and returned home to collect their wives. They returned shortly before the flood and were drowned.

According to another medieval Irish legend, Cessair is also the name of the King of Gallia's daughter. She married the High King of Ireland, Úgaine Mór, in either the 5th or 6th century BC.

Preceded by none	Mythical settlers of Ireland; AFM 2958 BC; FFE 2361 BC	Succeeded by Partholón
