= Contention of the bards =

17th-century literary controversy

The contention of the bards (Irish: Iomarbhágh na bhFileadh) was a literary controversy of early 17th century Gaelic Ireland, lasting from 1616 to 1624, probably peaking in 1617. The principal bardic poets of the country wrote polemical verses against each other and in support of their respective patrons.

There were 30 contributions to the Contention, which took the form of a bitter debate over the relative merits of the two halves of Ireland: the north, dominated by the Eremonian descendants of the Milesians, and the south, dominated by the Eberian descendants.

The verses were first published in print in two volumes produced by the Irish Texts Society in 1918 edited by Lambert McKenna who acknowledged the significant contribution of Eleanor Knott to the accompanying translations.

== Context ==
The Contention took place in the context of the settlement of the country following on the Tudor conquest of Ireland, when full domination by Stuart royal authority had led to the Flight of the Earls (1607) and the Plantation of Ulster (1610).

The occasion for the Contention was a dispute over the allegiance of the Earl of Thomond, a Gaelic nobleman of the ancient O'Brien clan (or sept). Unusually for the time, the earl was a Protestant and loyal to the new dispensation. The spark came in 1616, after the final annexation of the modern County Clare (containing part of the ancient kingdom of Thomond) to the Eberian province of Munster (when the Earl of Thomond was appointed president of the province) and the death in exile of the last great Eremonian, Hugh O'Neill in July that year.

For centuries before 1616, the bards had been sponsored by the Irish Gaelic dynasties, and confirmed their paternal lineages by recitals at social events, so they had a political importance as well as a cultural impact. In a society where most were illiterate, bardic recital in public was the primary method of recalling a clan's history back to its claimed Milesian origins.

== Substance ==
In 1616 the Earl of Thomond's bard, Tadhg Mac Dáire Mac Bruaideadha, wrote verses attacking the semi-legendary bard Torna Éigeas on account of historical inaccuracies in his work and his partiality to the northern half of Ireland and the Eremonian branches of the Gael. In effect, Tadhg's verses celebrated the greatness of the Eberian septs of the southern half of Ireland and their ascendancy over the North; he even included his patron's Norman lineage as worthy of the race of Ébhear.

This provoked verses in response from other court bards, notably, Lughaidh Ó Cléirigh, in which abstruse points of poetic etiquette and the respective merits of the two halves of Ireland were vehemently argued. In extolling his own side, Lughaidh emphasised the historical defence of Tara, rather than the internecine struggle for the high-kingship of Ireland; Tadhg's response referred to the achievements of his patron's ancestor, Brian Boru, and pooh-poohed the former martial feats of the Eremonians as consisting merely of battles among themselves; the northern poets (whose allegiance lay with the exiled Ulster princes) countered with the accusation that Tadhg was betraying the bardic profession in his failure to comprehend the truth of the noble history of the Gael.

Some of the participants in the Contention mocked the principal debate between Tadhg and Lughaidh; for example, Ó Heffernan used the fable of a cat and a fox (Eremonians and Eberians) that were bickering over a fat piece of meat (Ireland) when a wolf came along and snatched it all.

In June 1617, Tadhg had suggested in a letter to Lúghaidh and the northern poets that a decisive face-to-face poetic disputation be convened in order to resolve the Contention. It is not known if the suggestion was acted upon, but it appears to have marked the moment of greatest controversy. The Contention came to a head in a whirl of extreme sarcasm from the poet Mac Artúir, who defended the bards' tradition in a novel, run-on free-form, which contrasted with the traditional form in which Tadhg wrote.

== Perspective ==
The poems of the Contention share a sense of national culture, but their political allegiance is clan-centred. It was a period of decline for the court bards, and the fact that they were addressing each other suggests a realisation that their audience was losing its influence and that few within the new dispensation were paying heed to them.

In the course of the exchange, the theme of North–South rivalry was developed to include a debate about the struggle between tradition and iconoclasm. That allowed the poets to vent their bitterness at the late conquest and colonisation of the country and at the collapse of the political order upon which they depended.

Throughout the Contention, each side had eagerly and jealously claimed James I of Ireland as a descendant in its Milesian lineage, as he was descended from Marjorie Bruce whose ancestors included the Gaelic kings of Scotland, such as Kenneth McAlpine, back to the formation of the kingdom of Dál Riata c.400 CE. His royal authority based ultimately on his Gaelic ancestry was ironically the instrument by which the traditional Gaelic order was being destroyed or transformed in Ireland.

The Ireland that the poems traced in their lore was past, and it seems that the bards were incapable of adapting their ways. The Contention proved to be the last flourish of Dán Díreach courtly poetic style: within decades the great school metres had been abandoned in favour of the looser Amhrán or Aisling, and the esteem in which the bards had been held in Gaelic Ireland was never regained.

== See also ==
- Bardic poetry
- Irish poetry
- List of poetry collections
- Medieval poetry
