= Fiacha mac Delbaíth =

Legendary High King of Ireland

In Irish mythology, Fiacha (Irish pronunciation: [ˈfʲiəxə], sometimes Fiachu, Fiachra or Fiachna), son of Delbáeth, of the Tuatha Dé Danann, was a legendary High King of Ireland. According to the Lebor Gabála Érenn, he took the throne after his father was overthrown by Caicher son of Nama, brother of Nechtan. The Annals of the Four Masters and Geoffrey Keating say he overthrew his father himself. His mother was Ernmas. He had three daughters, Banba, Fódla, and Ériu, by his own mother. He reigned for ten years, before he and his nephew Aoi Mac Ollamain were killed in battle against Éogan of Imber.

Preceded by Delbáeth	High King of Ireland; AFM 1740–1730 BC; FFE 1327–1317 BC	Succeeded by Mac Cuill, Mac Cecht and Mac Gréine
