= Rathbeagh =

Townland in County Kilkenny, Ireland

Coordinates: 52.7525°N 7.3446°W

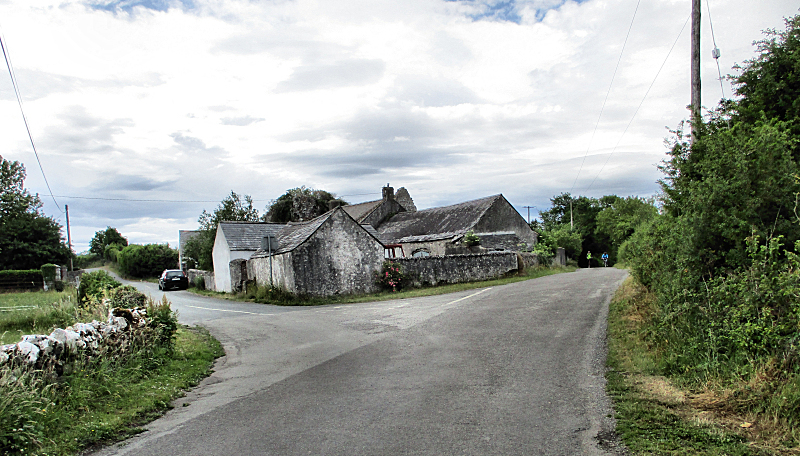
Road junction and buildings in Rathbeagh townland

Rathbeagh (Irish: Ráth Bheathach, meaning 'rath of birches') is a townland and hill on the River Nore in the parish of Lisdowney near Ballyragget, County Kilkenny, Ireland. The Irish language name is Rath Beithigh, meaning "rath (ringfort) of the birch trees". It is located in an ancient valley once called Mágh Airgid Rois ("plain of the silver wood").

The townland of Rathbeagh, which is 2.5 square kilometres (0.97 sq mi) in area, had a population of 52 as of the 2011 census.

== Built heritage ==
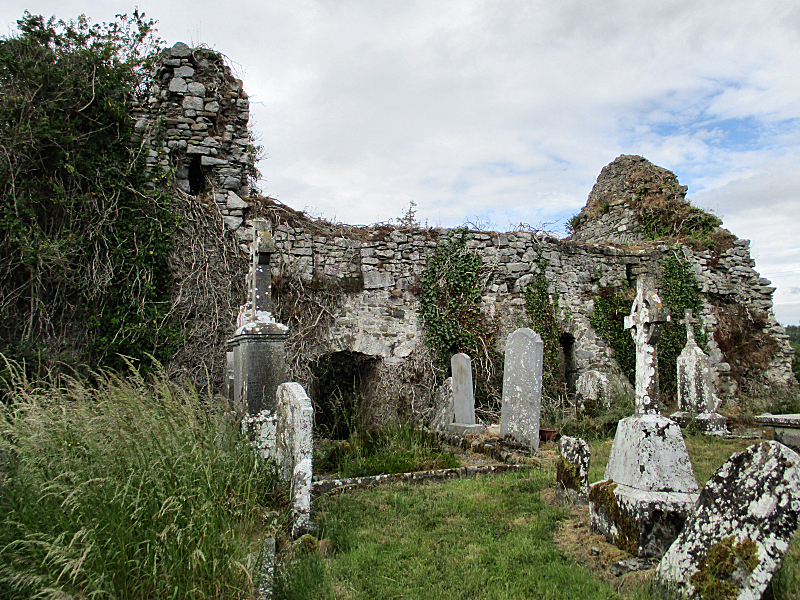
Ruined church and graveyard at Rathbeagh

=== Ringfort ===
The hill and ringfort (rath) at Rathbeagh, which gives the townland its name, consists of a flat-topped oval mound about 41 metres (135 ft) north to south and 36 metres (118 ft) east to west. A fosse 3.7 metres (12 ft) wide surrounds the mound, leaving a gap at the river's edge. Outside there is a rampart about 3 metres (9.8 ft) high. The whole structure overlooks a bend on the Nore. The river is fordable at this location, so strategically the fort controlled the crossing.

According to local tradition, the ringfort is the burial place of Heremon, son of the Celtic leader Milesius.

=== Ecclesiastical enclosure ===
The remains of a church, dedicated to St. Catherine, are located in an enclosed graveyard situated approximately 300 metres (980 ft) north of the ringfort. The church is built on the site of an earlier castle or stronghouse. Remains of what are believed to be stables or workshops were discovered in the adjacent field. The earliest gravestone date that can be distinguished in the graveyard is 1715.

Just east of the old church is a pond under the road, known locally as Poll Leabhair, meaning "pond of the book" or "hole of the book". According to tradition, the church was desecrated during the Cromwellian conquest of Ireland, and the missal was dumped in this pond. In the mid-19th century, a church bell was found in a sand-pit in a nearby field and was presented to the Church of Ireland church in Killeshan, County Carlow.

=== Holy well ===
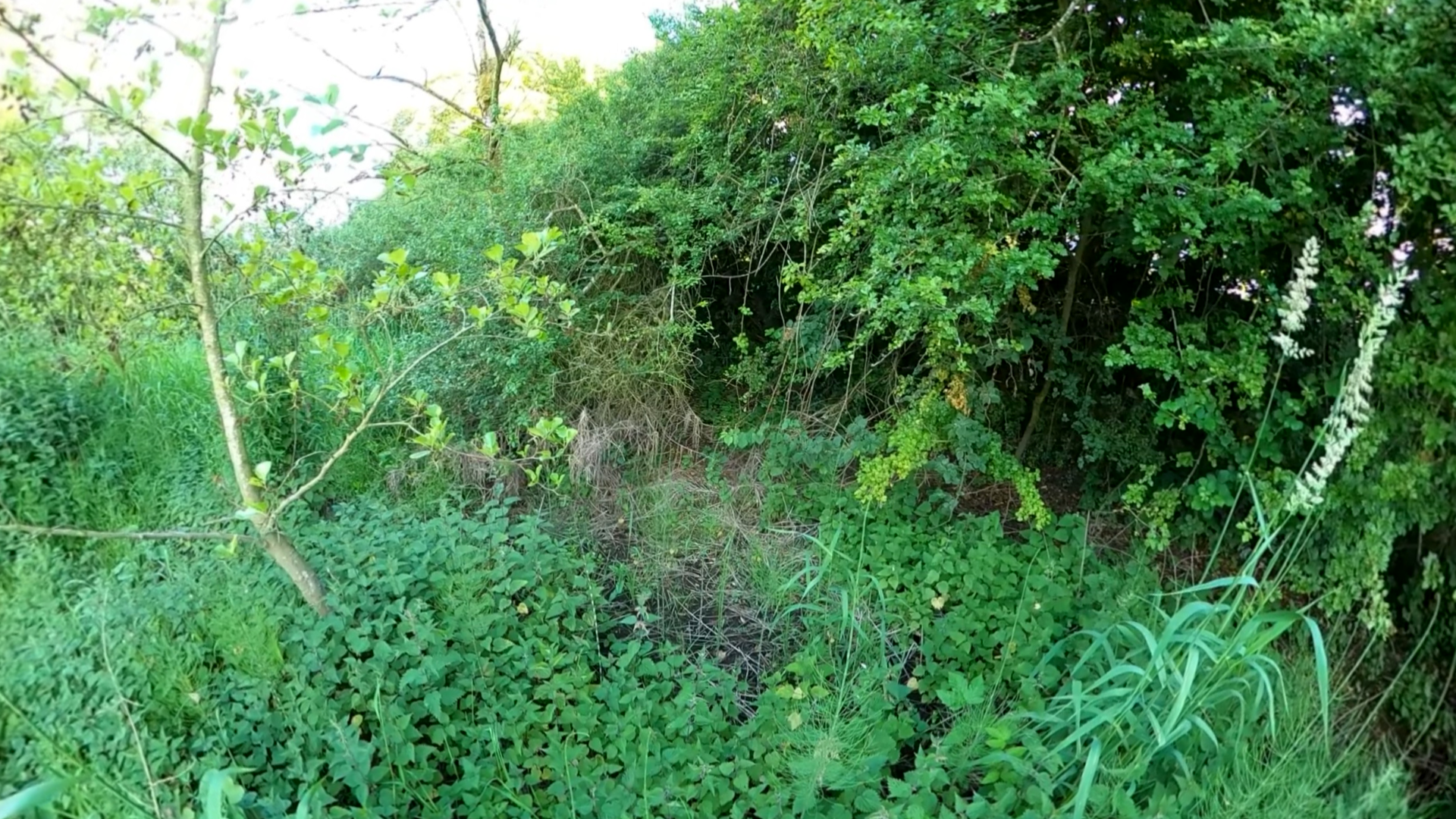
Site of St. Catherine's Well in 2024

A former holy well in the townland, Saint Catherine's Well or Tubber Naev Kathaleen, is recorded in the Record of Monuments and Places under record number "KK009-049----". The well was disused, and possibly destroyed, by 1839 when Eugene O'Curry wrote that it had historically been the site of a patron held annually on 24 June and 6 December in honour of St. Catherine. As of the 21st century, no trace of the holy well remains. Local folklore suggests that the well's water was used as a cure for eye disease.

== Notable people ==
- Kepple Elias and Mary Disney (parents of Elias Disney and grandparents of Walt Disney) were from the area
