= Macc Cuill =

The name Macc Cuill may refer to one of two characters in Irish folklore.

Maughold, often Macc Cuill, from Muirchú's Vita sancti Patricii, who was allegedly converted by Saint Patrick

Mac Cuill, the first of the three brothers responsible for the death of Lug
