= Donn =

Irish mythological figure

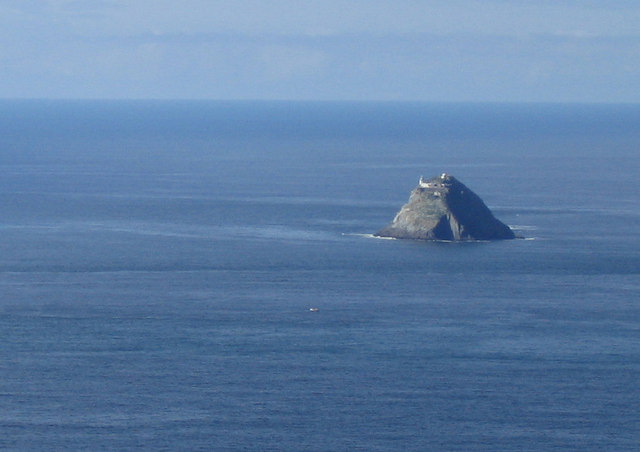
Bull Rock, off the southwest coast of Ireland, is often identified with Teach Duinn (the House of Donn)

In Irish mythology, Donn ("the dark one", from Proto-Celtic: *Dhuosnos) is an ancestor of the Gaels and believed to be a god of the dead. Donn is said to dwell in Teach Duinn (the "house of Donn" or "house of the dark one"), where the souls of the dead gather. He may have originally been an aspect of the Dagda. Folklore about Donn survived into the modern era in parts of Ireland, in which he is said to be a phantom horseman riding a white horse.

== Early literary sources ==
A ninth-century poem records that Donn's dying wish was for all his descendants to gather at his house or Tech Duinn (modern Irish Teach Duinn) after death: "To me, to my house, you shall all come after your deaths". The tenth-century tale Airne Fíngein ("Fíngen's Vigil") notes that Tech Duinn is where the souls of the dead gather. In their translation of Acallam na Senórach, Ann Dooley and Harry Roe observe that "to go to the House of Donn in Irish tradition means to die". This suggests that the pagan Gaels saw Donn as their ancestor and believed they would go to his abode after death. Tech Duinn may have been thought of as a place where the souls of the dead gathered before travelling to their final destination in the otherworld or before being reincarnated.

The Christian writers who recorded the Lebor Gabála Érenn made Donn into Éber Donn one of the mythical Milesian ancestors of the Gaels. The Milesians invade Ireland and take it from the Tuatha Dé Danann. During their invasion, Donn slights Ériu, one of the eponymous goddesses of Ireland, and he drowns in a shipwreck off the southwest coast. Donn is then buried on a rocky island which becomes known as Tech Duinn. In the literature, Tech Duinn is said to lie at or beyond the western edge of Ireland. Tech Duinn is commonly identified with Bull Rock, an islet off the western tip of the Beara Peninsula. Bull Rock resembles a dolmen or portal tomb as it has a natural tunnel through it, allowing the sea to pass under it as if through a portal. In Ireland there was a belief that the souls of the dead departed westwards over the sea with the setting sun.

The Metrical Dindshenchas entry for "Tech Duinn" recounts the tale:

Through the incantations of the druids a storm came upon them, and the ship wherein Donn was foundered. 'Let his body be carried to yonder high rock', says Amairgen: 'his folk shall come to this spot.' So hence it is called Tech Duinn: and for this cause, according to the heathen, the souls of sinners visit Tech Duinn before they go to hell, and give their blessing, ere they go, to the soul of Donn. But as for the righteous soul of a penitent, it beholds the place from afar, and is not borne astray. Such, at least, is the belief of the heathen. – Translation by E. Gwynn

In the tale Togail Bruidne Dá Derga ("The Destruction of Dá Derga's Hostel"), king Conaire Mór meets his death in Bruiden Dá Derga (the "great hall or hostel of the red god"). On his way to the hostel, Conaire meets three red men riding red horses from the otherworld. They foretell his doom and tell him "we ride the horses of Donn ... although we are alive, we are dead". Donn is called "king of the dead" in the tale. It has been suggested that Dá Derga and Dá Derga's Hostel is another name for Donn and his abode. It may be a name for the death god in the context of violent death or sacrifice, hence the name "red god".

In the tale Tochmarc Treblainne ("The Wooing of Treblann"), the otherworld woman Treblann elopes with the mortal man Fráech, who sends her to safety in Tech Duinn while he embarks on a quest. In this tale, Donn is said to be the son or foster-son of the Dagda. Dáithí Ó hÓgáin notes similarities between the two and suggests that Donn was originally an epithet of the Dagda.

Donn is the father of Diarmuid Ua Duibhne, whom he gave in fosterage to the god of youth, Aengus mac Óg, to raise.

== Modern sources ==
Folklore about Donn survived into the early modern era. In County Limerick, a Donn Fírinne was said to dwell in the sacred hill of Cnoc Fírinne (Knockfeerina or Knockfierna); folklore told of people being brought into the hill to be with Donn when they died. He was said to appear as a phantom horseman riding a white horse. He was also associated with the weather: thunder and lightning meant that Donn Fírinne was riding his horse through the sky; if clouds were over the hill, it meant that he was gathering them together to make rain. This imagery may have been influenced by the lore of Odin and his horse Sleipnir from the Norse settlers in Limerick. Donn Fírinne was also said to appear and warn anyone who interfered with his hill. On the west coast of County Clare there was a Donn na Duimhche or Donn Dumhach ("Donn of the dunes"), who "was also often encountered as a night-horseman". In later folklore, the name 'Donn' came to mean an 'otherworld lord' in general.

In modern Irish donn is the common adjective for the colour brown.

Defying Donn is the title of a 2026 novel about Irish revolutionary leader Michael Collins.

== See also ==
- Danu (Irish goddess)
- Dôn
- Hy-Brasil – legendary island to the west of Ireland
