= Érimón =

First Gaelic High King of Ireland

- High King of Ireland
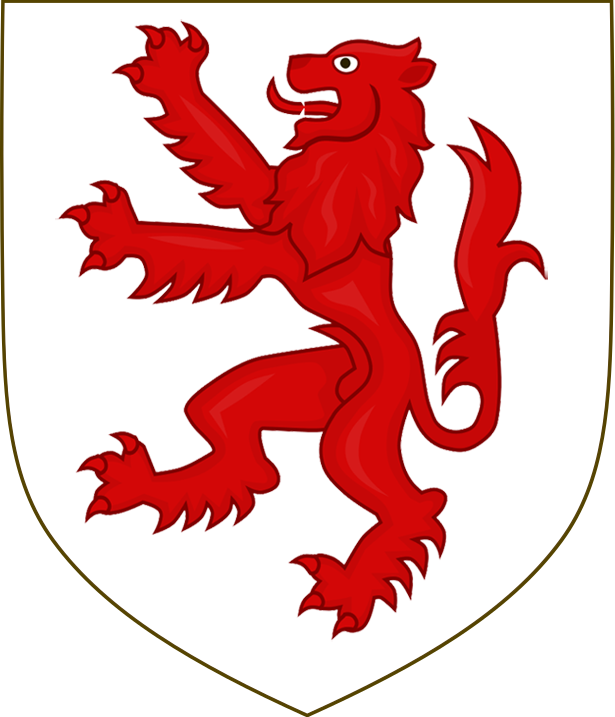
- The Red Lion of Heremon.
- Reign: c. 1700–1684 BC
- Coronation: Hill of Tara
- Predecessor: Éber Finn
- Successor: Íriel Fáid
- Born: unknown Iberia
- Died: c. 1684 BC; Ireland
- House: Milesian
- Father: Míl Espáine
- Mother: Scota
- Religion: Celtic polytheism

Érimón (Modern Irish: Éireamhón), commonly Anglicised as Heremon, son of Míl Espáine (and great-grandson of Breoghan, king of Celtic Galicia), according to medieval Irish legends and historical traditions, was one of the chieftains who took part in the Milesian invasion of Ireland, which conquered the island from the Tuatha Dé Danann, and one of the first Milesian High Kings.

== Background ==
Before coming to Ireland, he and his older brother Éber Donn were joint rulers of Spain. His great-uncle Íth made a peaceful expedition to Ireland, which he had seen from the top of a tower built by his father Breogan, but was killed by the three kings of the Tuatha Dé Danann, Mac Cuill, Mac Cecht and Mac Gréine, and in revenge the Milesians invaded in force, with Érimón and Éber Donn in command. They defeated the Tuatha Dé Danann in the Battle of Tailtiu. Éber Donn had been killed, and the High Kingship was divided between Érimón in the north and his younger brother Éber Finn in the south.

== High Kingship of Ireland ==
A year after the Battle of Tailtiu, Éber Finn became unhappy with his half and fought a battle with his brother at Airgetros, a district along the River Nore where counties Kilkenny and Laois now meet. There Éber Finn lost and was killed. Érimón became sole ruler of Ireland and built his capital at Ráth Oinn (later site of Rathdown Castle, on the east coast near modern Greystones). He appointed kings of the four provinces. He gave Leinster to Crimthann Sciathbél of the Fir Domnann; Munster to the four sons of Eber Finn, Ér, Orba, Ferón and Fergna; Connacht to Ún and Étan, sons of Uicce; and Ulster to Eber mac Ír. During this time the Cruithne settled in Ireland. He ruled for fourteen, fifteen or seventeen further years, after which he died at Airgetros, and was succeeded by his sons Muimne, Luigne and Laigne, ruling jointly.

Geoffrey Keating dates his reign from 1287 to 1272 BC, the Annals of the Four Masters from 1700 to 1684 BC.

Some philologists believe Érimón and Zarathustra’s mythological Aryaman character, who gives their name to Iran, are cognates. Georges Dumèzil retracted his initial view on this matter. However, the idea remains seductive to some commentators, based on the coincidence of the similar sound between the two names, that they both are mythological founders of two separate great Indo-European cultures, the inclusion of the M-N- sound in their respective names, and the fact that many of the great Indo-European cultural traditions’ founders share the same M-N- laden moniker.

== Family and descendants ==
Érimón had two wives, Odba, mother of Muimne, Luigne and Laigne, whom he left behind in Spain, and Tea, mother of Íriel Fáid, who accompanied him to Ireland and died there. Tea was a daughter of Lugaid and gave her name to Tara, where she was buried – the Lebor Gabála Érenn explains its Old Irish name Temair as "Tea mur", "Tea's Wall". Through his son, Íriel Fáid, Érimón was the progenitor of the Heremonians and provided many High Kings of Ireland. Kinship groups of Irish Gaels which are classified as Heremonians were most powerful in Connacht, Osraige, Leinster and parts of Ulster and include the Connachta, Uí Néill, Clan Colla, Uí Maine, Laighin, Dalcassians and the Érainn.

The Red Lion of Heremon features in Irish heraldry and Scottish heraldry as a device in the coat of arms of many of Heremon's claimed descendants, including:

O'Neill

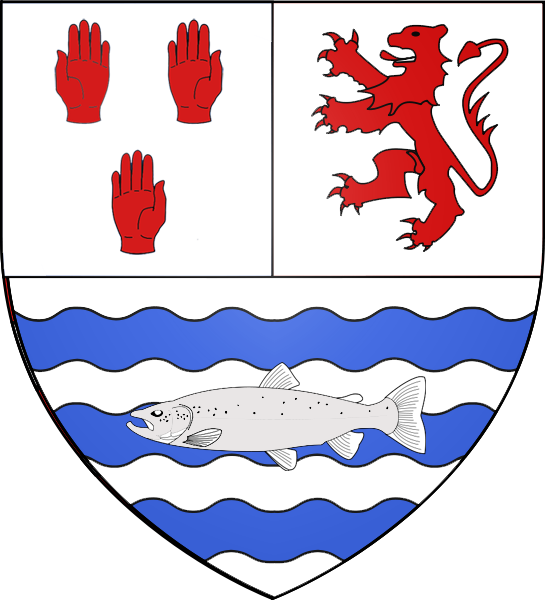
O'Melaghlin

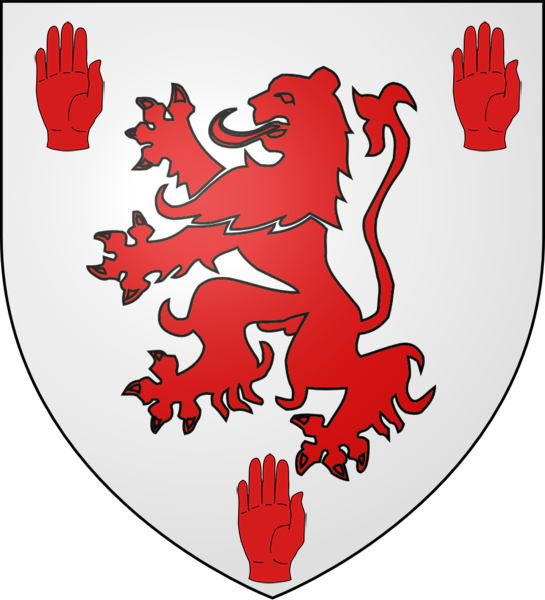
MacGeoghegan

Magawly

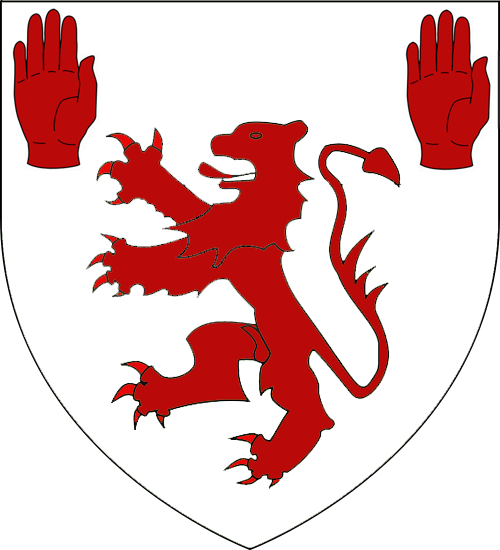
O'Kearney

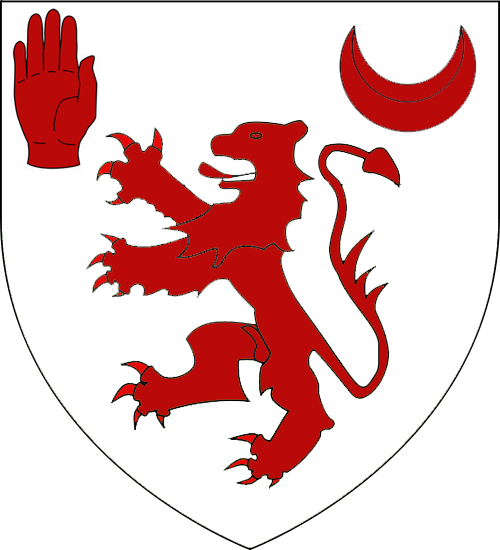
McCaughey

Kavanagh

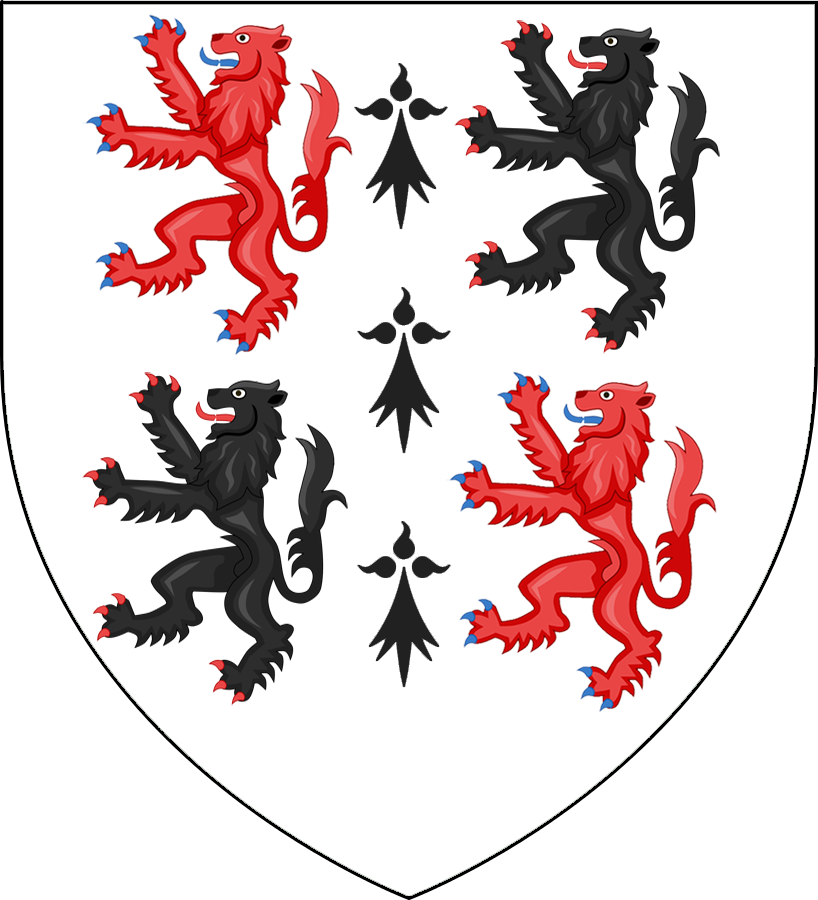
Donegan

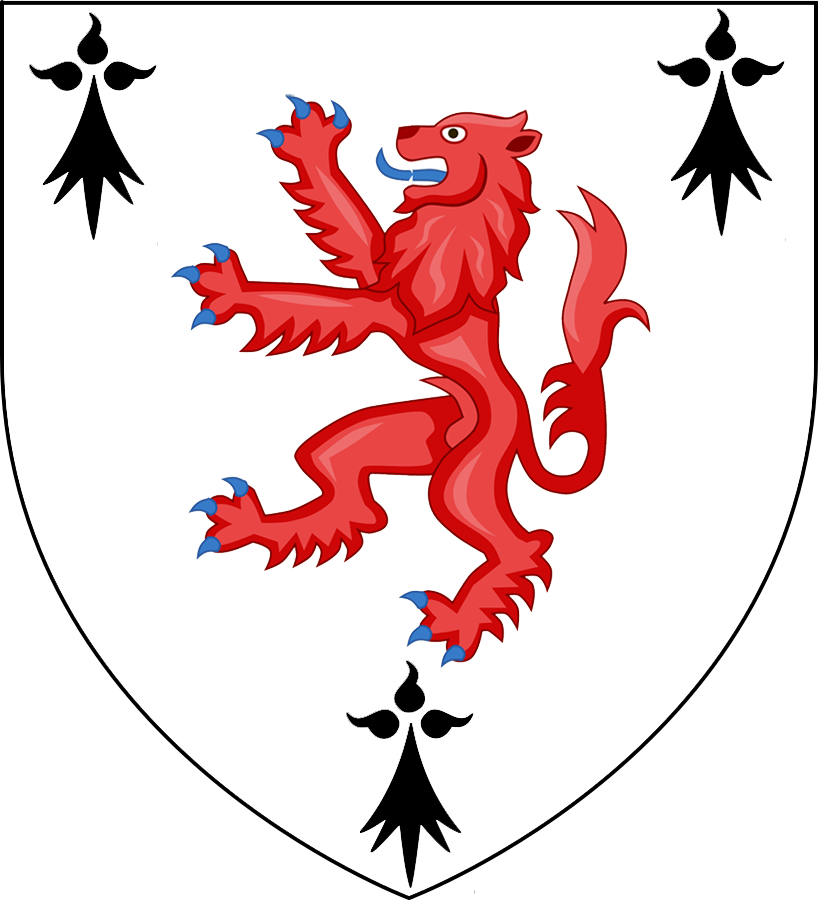
O'Dwyer

MacMahon

Dunkeld

MacDuff

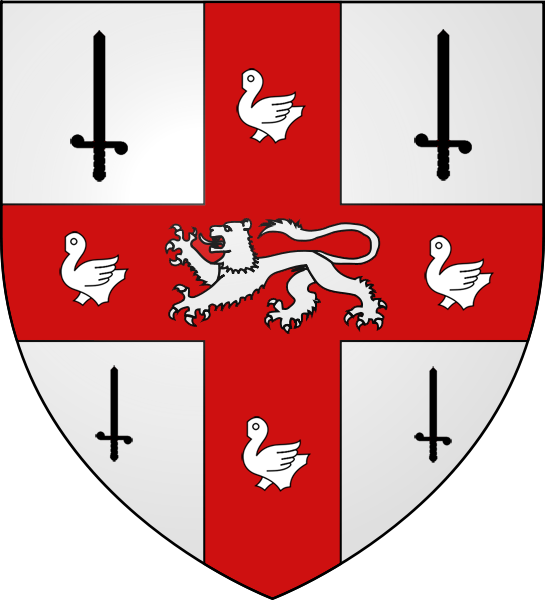
Nualláin

== See also ==
- Rathbeagh

Royal titles
Preceded by Mac Cuill, Mac Cecht and Mac Gréine	High King of Ireland (jointly with Eber Finn for the first year); AFM 1700–1684 BC; FFE 1287–1272 BC	Succeeded by Muimne, Luigne and Laigne
