= Lambert McKenna =

Irish academic (1870–1956)

- Born: Andrew Joseph Lambert McKenna; 16 July 1870; Clontarf, County Dublin, Ireland
- Died: 27 December 1956 (aged 86)
- Occupations: Jesuit priest, social reformer, lexicographer, writer, editor, academic and educationist

Lambert McKenna S.J. (Irish: An tAthair Lámhbheartach Mac Cionnaith; 16 July 1870 – 27 December 1956) was a Jesuit priest and writer.

He was born Andrew Joseph Lambert McKenna in Clontarf, and studied in Europe. He collected and edited religious and folk poetry in the Irish language. Working with the Irish Texts Society, he edited the famous Contention of the bards and many anthologies of Irish bardic poetry and historical works. He was an editor of the Irish Monthly and An Timire. He also served as principal of Belvedere College.

He was awarded an honorary Doctorate for his contribution to Celtic Studies (D. Litt. Celt) by UCD in 1947 on the same day that Jack Butler Yeats was also awarded an honorary Doctorate. McKenna was a committed social reformer and an outspoken critic of capitalism. In the first tract of his book The Church and Labour (1914) he wrote:

"The wealthy few now rule the world. They have done so before, but never precisely in virtue of their wealth. They were patriarchs, patricians, chieftains of clans, feudal nobles acknowledging responsibilities and bearing heavy burdens. Today wealth making no sacrifices for the public good, rules in its own right, and exercises a more despotic sway than any form of authority hitherto known. It has armies and fleets at command. It has myriads of placemen, or would-be placemen, in utter dependence. It is highly centralised, and can exert a great power at any point. It can at any moment cast thousands of households into intolerable misery. Yet, though centralised, it is not open to attack. It does not, as the kings of old, dwell in castles that can be stormed by an angry people. On the contrary it stands as the embodiment of legality, order, security, peace—even of popular will. Capitalism, using the work of the labouring classes, has vastly increased the wealth of the world; yet it strives to prevent these labouring classes from benefiting by this increase. It is constantly drawing up into itself that wealth and diverting it from useful purposes."

== Works ==
- English-Irish Phrase Dictionary (1911)
- The Church and Labour: Series of Six Tracts (1913–14)
- Dánta do chum Aonghus Fionn Ó Dálaigh (1919)
- Iomarbháigh na bhfileadh (1918–20)
- The Social Teachings of James Connolly (1920)
- Dán Dé (1922)
- Life and Work of Rev. Aloysius Cullen S.J. (1924)
- Philip Bocht Ó hUiginn (1931)
- English-Irish Dictionary (1935)
- Dioghluim Dána (1938)
- Athdioghluim Dána (1939–40)
- Bardic Syntactical Tracts (1944)
- Leabhar Méig Shamhradháin (1947)
- Leabhar Í Eadhra (1951)
