= Lebor Gabála Érenn =

11th-century Irish chronicle

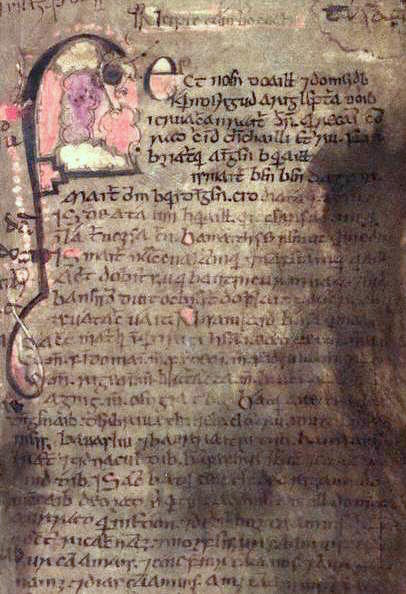
Folio 53 from the Book of Leinster. Lebor Gabála Érenn is recorded in more than a dozen medieval manuscripts and the Book of Leinster is just one of the primary sources of text. Image: Dublin, TCD, MS 1339 (olim MS H 2.18)

Lebor Gabála Érenn (literally "The Book of Ireland's Taking"; Modern Irish spelling: Leabhar Gabhála Éireann, known in English as The Book of Invasions) is a collection of poems and prose narratives in the Irish language intended to be a history of Ireland and the Irish from the creation of the world to the Middle Ages. There are a number of versions, the earliest of which was compiled by an anonymous writer in the 11th century. It synthesised narratives that had been developing over the foregoing centuries. The Lebor Gabála tells of Ireland being taken by six groups of people: the people of Cessair, the people of Partholón, the people of Nemed, the Fir Bolg, the Tuatha Dé Danann, and the Milesians. The first four groups are wiped out or forced to abandon the island; the fifth group represents Ireland's pagan gods, while the final group represents the Irish people (the Gaels).

The Lebor Gabála was highly influential and was largely "accepted as conventional history by poets and scholars down until the 19th century". Today, scholars regard the Lebor Gabála as primarily myth rather than history. It appears to be mostly based on medieval Christian pseudo-histories, but it also incorporates some of Ireland's native pagan mythology. Scholars believe that the goal of its writers was to provide a history for Ireland that could compare to that of Rome or Israel, and which was compatible with Christian teaching. The Lebor Gabála became one of the most popular and influential works of early Irish literature. Mark Williams says it was "written in order to bridge the chasm between Christian world-chronology and the prehistory of Ireland".

The Lebor Gabála is usually known in English as The Book of Invasions or The Book of Conquests. In Modern Irish it is Leabhar Gabhála Éireann or Leabhar Gabhála na hÉireann.

== Origin and purpose ==
The writers of Lebor Gabála Érenn sought to create an epic written history of the Irish comparable to that of the Israelites in the Old Testament of the Bible. This history was intended to fit the Irish into Christian world-chronology, to "find a place for Ireland in the Biblical history of the world". In doing so, it links them to events from the Old Testament and likens them to the Israelites. Ancestors of the Irish were described as enslaved in a foreign land, fleeing into exile, wandering in the wilderness, or sighting the "Promised Land" from afar. The writers also sought to incorporate native pre-Christian stories about the origins of the Irish, and to reconcile them with medieval Christian lore.

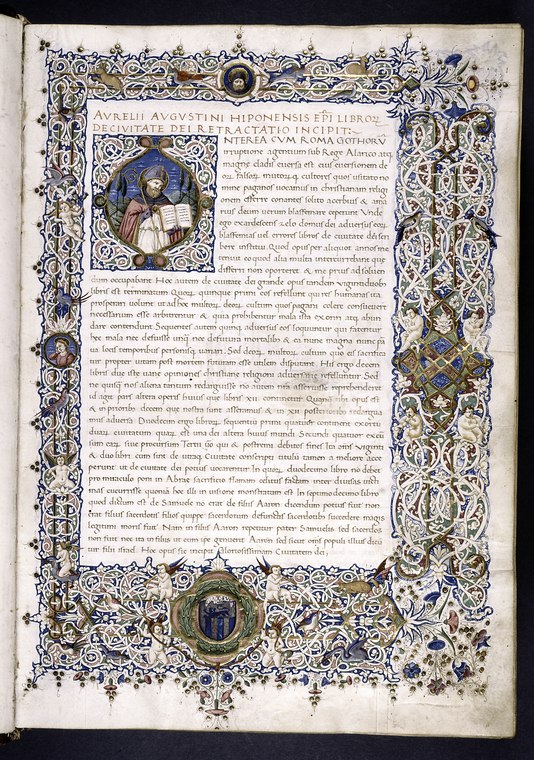
The authors of Lebor Gabála Érenn were strongly influenced by such religious texts as St. Augustine of Hippo's 5th-century book, City of God.

The LGE seems to have been influenced by four major Christian works in particular:

- St Augustine's De Civitate Dei, (The City of God), (413–426 AD)
- Orosius's Historiae adversum paganos, "Histories", (417)
- Eusebius's Chronicon, translated into Latin by St Jerome as the Temporum liber (379)
- Isidore of Seville's Etymologiae ("Etymologies") (early 7th century)

The pre-Christian elements, however, were never entirely effaced. One of the poems in LGE, for instance, recounts how goddesses from among the Tuatha Dé Danann took husbands from the Gaeil when they 'invaded' and 'colonised' Ireland. The pattern of successive invasions recounted in the LGE is reminiscent of Timagenes of Alexandria's account of the origins of the Gauls of continental Europe. Cited by the 4th-century historian Ammianus Marcellinus, Timagenes (1st century BC) describes how the ancestors of the Gauls were driven from their native lands in eastern Europe by a succession of wars and floods.

Numerous fragments of Ireland's mythological history are scattered throughout the 7th and 8th centuries. In his Lectures on the Manuscript Materials of Ancient Irish History (1861), Eugene O'Curry, Professor of Irish History and Archaeology at the Catholic University of Ireland, discussed various genres of historical tales mentioned in the manuscripts:

The Tochomladh was an Immigration or arrival of a Colony; and under this name the coming of the several colonies of Parthalon of Nemedh, of the Firbolgs, the Tuatha Dé Danann, the Milesians, etc., into Erinn, are all described in separate tales. It is probably from the original records of these ancient stories that the early part of the various Books of Invasions has been compiled.

R. A. Stewart Macalister believes that the LGE was a conflation of two independent works: a History of the Gaedil (modelled after the history of the Israelites in the Old Testament), and an account of several pre-Gaelic settlements of Ireland (to the historicity of which Macalister gave very little credence). The latter was then inserted into the middle of the other work. Macalister theorised that the quasi-Biblical text had been a scholarly Latin work named Liber Occupationis Hiberniae ("The Book of the Taking of Ireland").

The earliest surviving account of Irish origins is found in the Historia Brittonum ("History of the Britons"), written in Wales in the 9th century. The story probably came from a now-lost Irish source. It says that Ireland was settled by three groups of people from the Iberian Peninsula. The first are the people of Partholón, who all die of plague. The second are the people of Nemed, who eventually return to Iberia. The last group are led by three sons of a warrior or soldier from Hispania (mīles Hispaniae), who sail to Ireland in thirty ships. They see a glass tower in the middle of the sea and set out to capture it, but when they reach it, all but one of their ships are sunk. Only one ship is saved, and its passengers are the ancestors of all the Irish.

When the Lebor Gabála was first compiled in the 11th century, the three waves of settlers had grown to six. Joseph Lennon says "These waves may, in fact, represent the redactors' attempts to account for numerous oral accounts in Irish of origin legends". It is also suggested that there are six waves to match the "Six Ages of the World".

These stories continued to be enriched and elaborated upon by Irish historian-poets throughout the 9th century. In the 10th and 11th centuries, several long historical poems were written that were later incorporated into the scheme of LGE. Most of the poems on which the 11th–12th century version of LGE was based were written by the following four poets:

- Eochaidh Ua Floinn (936–1004) from Armagh – Poems 30, 41, 53, 65, 98, 109, 111
- Flann Mainistrech mac Echthigrin (died 1056), lector and historian of Monasterboice Abbey – Poems ?42, 56, 67, ?82
- Tanaide (died c. 1075) – Poems 47, 54, 86
- Gilla Cómáin mac Gilla Samthainde (fl. 1072) – Poems 13, 96, 115

It was late in the 11th century that a single anonymous scholar appears to have brought together these and numerous other poems and fitted them into an elaborate prose framework – partly of his own composition and partly drawn from older, no longer extant sources (i.e. the tochomlaidh referred to above by O'Curry), paraphrasing and enlarging the verse. The result was the earliest version of LGE. It was written in Middle Irish, a form of Irish Gaelic used between 900 and 1200.

== Versions ==
Within a century of its compilation there existed a plethora of copies and revisions of Lebor Gabála, with as many as 136 poems between them. It is "somewhat misleading" to refer to the Lebor Gabála as one narrative. No two versions are identical, although many elements remain the same. There are five recensions, surviving in more than a dozen medieval manuscripts:

- First Redaction (R¹): preserved in The Book of Leinster (c. 1150) and The Book of Fermoy (1373).
- Míniugud (Min): this recension is closely related to the Second Redaction. It is probably older than the surviving MSS of that redaction, though not older than the now-lost exemplar on which those MSS were based. The surviving sources are suffixed to copies of the Second Redaction.
- Second Redaction (R²): survives in no less than seven separate texts, the best known of which is The Great Book of Lecan (1418).
- Third Redaction (R³): preserved in both The Book of Ballymote (1391) and The Great Book of Lecan.
- O'Clery's Redaction (K): written in 1631 by Mícheál Ó Cléirigh (Michael O'Clery), a Franciscan scribe and one of the Four Masters. Unlike the earlier versions of LGE, this redaction is in Early Modern Irish but was admitted as an independent redaction by Macalister because there are indications that the author had access to sources which are no longer extant and which were not used by the compilers of the other four redactions. The work was compiled in the convent of Lisgool, near Enniskillen. O'Clery was assisted by Gillapatrick O'Luinin and Peregrine O'Clery (Michael O'Clery's third cousin once removed, and also one of the Four Masters).

The following table summarises the extant manuscripts that contain versions of LGE. Most of the abbreviations used are taken from R. A. S. Macalister's critical edition of the work (see references for details):

Sigla	Manuscript	Location	Redactions	Notes
A	Stowe A.2.4	Royal Irish Academy	R²	A direct and poor copy of D
B	The Book of Ballymote	Royal Irish Academy	R³	B lost one folio after β, β¹ and β² were derived from it
β	H.2.4	Trinity College Dublin	R³	A transcript of B made in 1728 by Richard Tipper
β¹	H.1.15	Trinity College Dublin	R³	A copy, made around 1745 by Tadhg Ó Neachtain, of a lost transcript of B
β²	Stowe D.3.2	Royal Irish Academy	R³	An anonymous copy of the same lost transcript of B
D	Stowe D.4.3	Royal Irish Academy	R²	
E	E.3.5. no. 2	Trinity College Dublin	R²	
F¹	The Book of Fermoy	Royal Irish Academy	R¹	F¹ and F² are parts of one dismembered MS, F
F²	Stowe D.3.1	Royal Irish Academy	R¹	F¹ and F² are parts of one dismembered MS, F
H	H.2.15. no. 1	Trinity College Dublin	R³	
L	The Book of Leinster	Trinity College Dublin	R¹	
Λ	The Book of Lecan	Royal Irish Academy	R², Min	First text of LGE in The Book of Lecan
M	The Book of Lecan	Royal Irish Academy	R³	Second text of LGE in The Book of Lecan
P	P.10266	National Library of Ireland	R²	
R	Rawl.B.512	Bodleian Library	R², Min	Only the prose text is written out in full: the poems are truncated
V¹	Stowe D.5.1	Royal Irish Academy	R², Min	V¹, V² and V³ are parts of one dismembered MS, V
V²	Stowe D.4.1	Royal Irish Academy	R², Min	V¹, V² and V³ are parts of one dismembered MS, V
V³	Stowe D.1.3	Royal Irish Academy	R², Min	V¹, V² and V³ are parts of one dismembered MS, V
K¹	23 K 32	Royal Irish Academy	K	Fair copy of the author Michael O Clery's autograph. K is contained in several paper manuscripts, but K¹, the "authoritative autograph", takes precedence.

The LGE was translated into French in 1884. The first complete English translation was made by R. A. Stewart Macalister between 1937 and 1942. It was accompanied by an apparatus criticus, Macalister's own notes and an introduction. Macalister's translation "synthesizes the versions of this already synthesized text".

== Contents ==
The collection can be divided into ten chapters:

=== Genesis ===
A retelling of the familiar Christian story of the creation, the fall of Man and the early history of the world. In addition to Genesis, the author draws upon several recondite works for many of his details (e.g. the Syriac Cave of Treasures), as well as the four Christian works mentioned earlier (i.e. St. Augustine's City of God, Orosius's Histories, Eusebius's Chronicle, and Isidore of Seville's Etymologies).

This part also contains a genealogy derived via the Historia Brittonum from the 6th-century Frankish Table of Nations, itself relying partly on the 1st-century Germania of Tacitus. It gives the descent of the major peoples of Europe from three brothers.

=== Early history of the Gaels ===
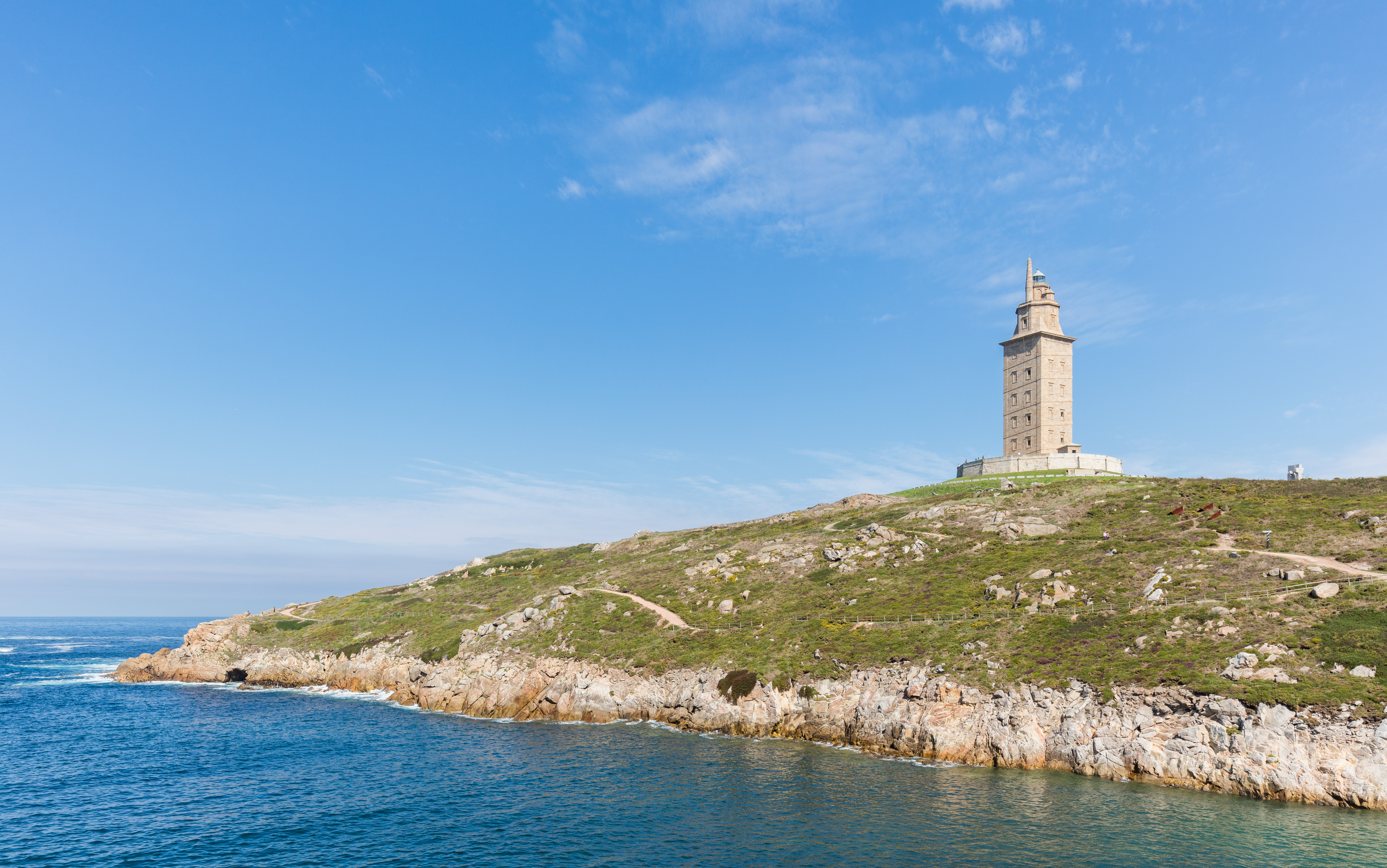
Tower of Hercules (A Coruña, Galicia)

This chapter begins by explaining that all mankind is descended from Adam through the sons of Noah. It tells us how Noah's son Japheth is the forebear of all Europeans (see Japhetites), how Japheth's son Magog is the forebear of the Gaels and Scythians, and how Fénius Farsaid is the forebear of the Gaels. Fénius, a prince of Scythia, is described as one of 72 chieftains who built the Tower of Babel. His son Nel weds Scota, daughter of the Egyptian pharaoh Cingris, and they have a son named Goídel Glas. Goídel crafts the Goidelic (Gaelic) language from the original 72 languages that arose after the confusion of tongues. Goídel's offspring, the Goidels (Gaels), leave Egypt at the same time as the Israelites (the Exodus) and settle in Scythia. After some time they leave Scythia and spend 440 years travelling the Earth, undergoing trials and tribulations akin to those of the Israelites. The druid Caicher foretells that their descendants will reach Ireland. After seven years at sea, they settle in the Maeotian marshes. They then sail via Crete and Sicily and eventually conquer Iberia. There, Goídel's descendant Breogán founds a city called Brigantia, and builds a tower from the top of which his son Íth glimpses Ireland. Brigantia was the Roman name of Corunna in Galicia and Breogán's tower is possibly based on the Tower of Hercules, which was rebuilt at Corunna by the Romans.

=== Cessair ===
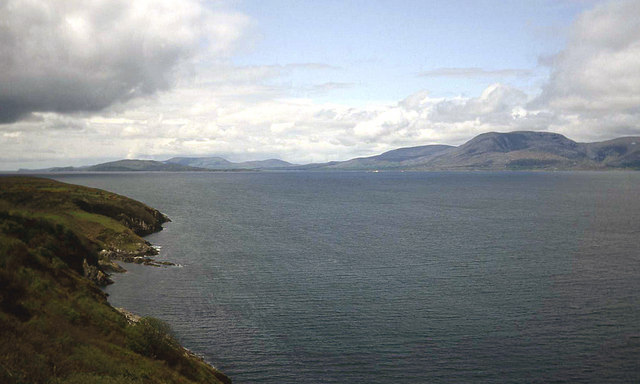
Bantry Bay, where Cessair and her followers are said to have landed

According to the Lebor Gabála, the first people to arrive in Ireland are led by Cessair, daughter of Bith, son of Noah. They are told to go to the western edge of the world to escape the oncoming Flood. They set out in three ships, but two are lost at sea. They land in Ireland, at Dún na mBárc on Bantry Bay, forty days before the Flood. The only survivors are Cessair, forty-nine other women, and three men: Fintan mac Bóchra, Bith and Ladra. The women are split evenly among the men. Each also takes one as his wife: Fintán takes Cessair, Bith takes Barrfhind and Ladra takes Alba. However, Bith and Ladra soon die and Ladra is the first man buried in Ireland. When the Flood comes, Fintán is the only one to survive. He becomes a salmon and later an eagle and a hawk, living for 5,500 years after the Flood, whence he becomes a man again and recounts Ireland's history.

In an earlier version of the tale, the first woman in Ireland is Banba. Banba, Fódla and Ériu were a trio of land goddesses and their husbands were Mac Cuill (son of hazel), Mac Cecht (son of the plough) and Mac Gréine (son of the Sun). It is likely that Cessair, the three men and their three wives are a Christianised replacement for them. Fintán/Mac Cuill may also be linked to the Salmon of Knowledge, which gains all the world's knowledge after eating nine hazelnuts that fell into a well. The women who accompany Cessair appear by their names to represent the world's ancestral mothers; they included Alba (ancestor of the Britons), Espa (Spanish), German (Germans), Gothiam (Goths), Traige (Thracians), and so forth. Thus "their arrival can be read as creating a microcosm of the whole world's population in Ireland". Several other companions echo the names of ancient Irish goddesses.

=== Partholón ===
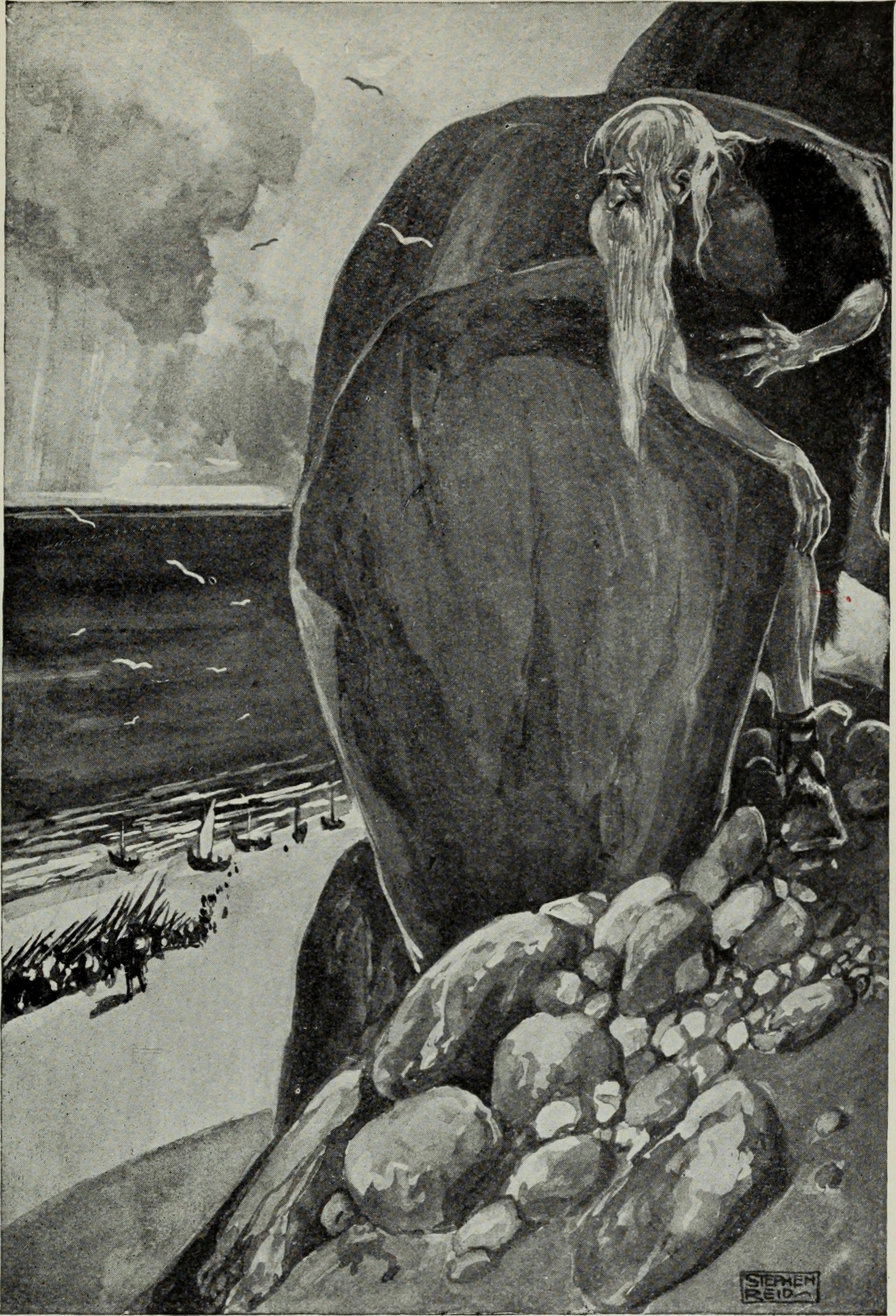
"Tuan watches Nemed", illustration by Stephen Reid in T. W. Rolleston's Myths & Legends of the Celtic Race, 1911

Ireland is then uninhabited for 300 years, until a second group of people arrive. They are led by Partholón, who is descended from Noah through Magog. They sail to Ireland via Gothia, Anatolia, Greece, Sicily and Iberia. They include Partholón's wife Delgnat, their four chieftain sons, and others. When they arrive, there is only one open plain, three lakes and nine rivers. They clear four more plains and a further seven lakes burst from the ground. Named figures are credited with introducing cattle husbandry, ploughing, cooking, brewing, and dividing the island in four. They battle and defeat the mysterious Fomorians, who are led by Cichol Gricenchos. Eventually, Partholón and his people (now 5,000 men and 4,000 women) die of plague in a single week. Only one man, Tuan mac Cairill, survives. Like Fintán, he lives for centuries in a number of forms, so that he can recount Irish history. This chapter also includes the tale of Delgnat committing adultery with a servant.

Partholón comes from Bartholomaeus (Bartholomew) and he is probably an invention of the Christian writers, possibly being borrowed from a character of that name in the Christian histories of Saint Jerome and Isidore. The Fomorians have been interpreted as a group of deities who represent the harmful or destructive powers of nature; personifications of chaos, darkness, death, blight and drought.

=== Nemed ===
Ireland is then uninhabited for 30 years, until a third group of people arrive. They are led by Nemed, who is also descended from Noah through Magog.

They set out from the Caspian Sea in 44 ships but, after a year and a half of sailing, the only ship to reach Ireland is Nemed's. On board are his wife, his four chieftain sons, and others. During their time in Ireland, the Nemedians clear twelve plains and build two royal forts, and four lakes burst from the ground. They win four battles against the Fomorians.

After Nemed and many others die of plague, the Nemedians are oppressed by the Fomorians Conand and Morc. Each Samhain, they must give two-thirds of their children, their wheat and their milk to the Fomorians. This tribute that the Nemedians are forced to pay may be "a dim memory of sacrifice offered at the beginning of winter, when the powers of darkness and blight are in the ascendant". Eventually, they rise up against the Fomorians and attack the Tower of Conand with 60,000 warriors (30,000 on sea and 30,000 on land), defeating Conand. Morc then attacks, and almost all of the Nemedians are either killed in the fighting or swept away by the sea. Only one ship of thirty men escapes. Some of them go "into the north of the world", some go to Britain and become the ancestors of all Britons, and some go south to Greece.

=== Fir Bolg ===
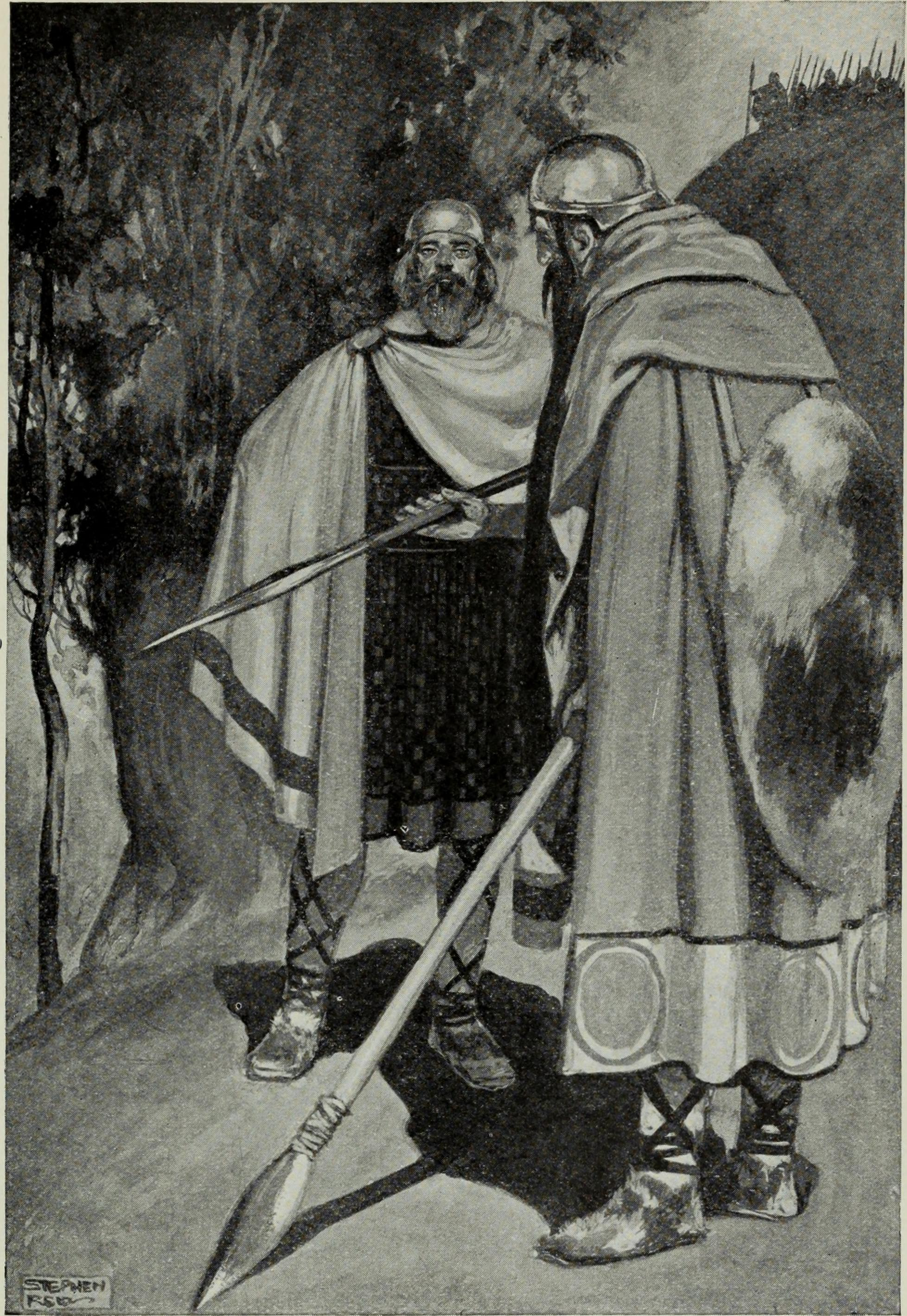
Ambassadors of the Fir Bolg and Tuath Dé meeting before the Battle of Moytura, illustration by Stephen Reid

Those who went to Greece were enslaved by the Greeks and made to carry bags of soil and clay. After 230 years, they sail back to Ireland. They are known as the Fir Bolg (men of bags), and contain two sub-groups known as the Fir Domnann and Fir Gálioin. Led by their five chieftains, they divide Ireland into five provinces: Gann takes North Munster, Sengann takes South Munster, Genann takes Connacht, Rudraige takes Ulster and Slanga takes Leinster. A succession of nine High Kings rule over Ireland for the next 37 years.

=== Tuatha Dé Danann ===
Those who went into the north of the world are the supernaturally-gifted Tuatha Dé Danann (or Tuath Dé), who represent the main pagan gods of Ireland. They come to Ireland in dark clouds and land on Sliabh an Iarainn in the west, bringing with them Four Treasures. They fight the Fir Bolg for the ownership of Ireland in the First Battle of Mag Tuired (Moytura). The Tuath Dé are victorious. In some versions, the Fir Bolg flee Ireland and settle on remote offshore islands, while in others they are granted the province of Connacht. Nuada, king of the Tuath Dé, loses his hand or arm in the battle and is thus no longer fit to be their king. He is replaced by Bres (a half-Fomorian), who becomes High King of Ireland. However, Bres mistreats the Tuath Dé and neglects his kingly duties. This may reflect the occasional supremacy of the powers of blight (the Fomorians) over the powers of growth (the Tuath Dé). After seven years, Dian Cecht the physician and Credne the metalsmith replace Nuada's hand/arm with a working silver one, and he re-takes the kingship. Though in some versions Nuada's arm is replaced with a silver one by Dian Cecht immediately, but he is still considered unfit to be king and Dian Cecht's son Cian replaces it with an arm made of flesh. The Tuath Dé then fight the Fomorians in the Second Battle of Moytura. Balor the Fomorian kills Nuada, but Balor's grandson Lugh kills him and becomes king. The Tuath Dé enjoy 150 years of unbroken rule.

=== Milesians ===
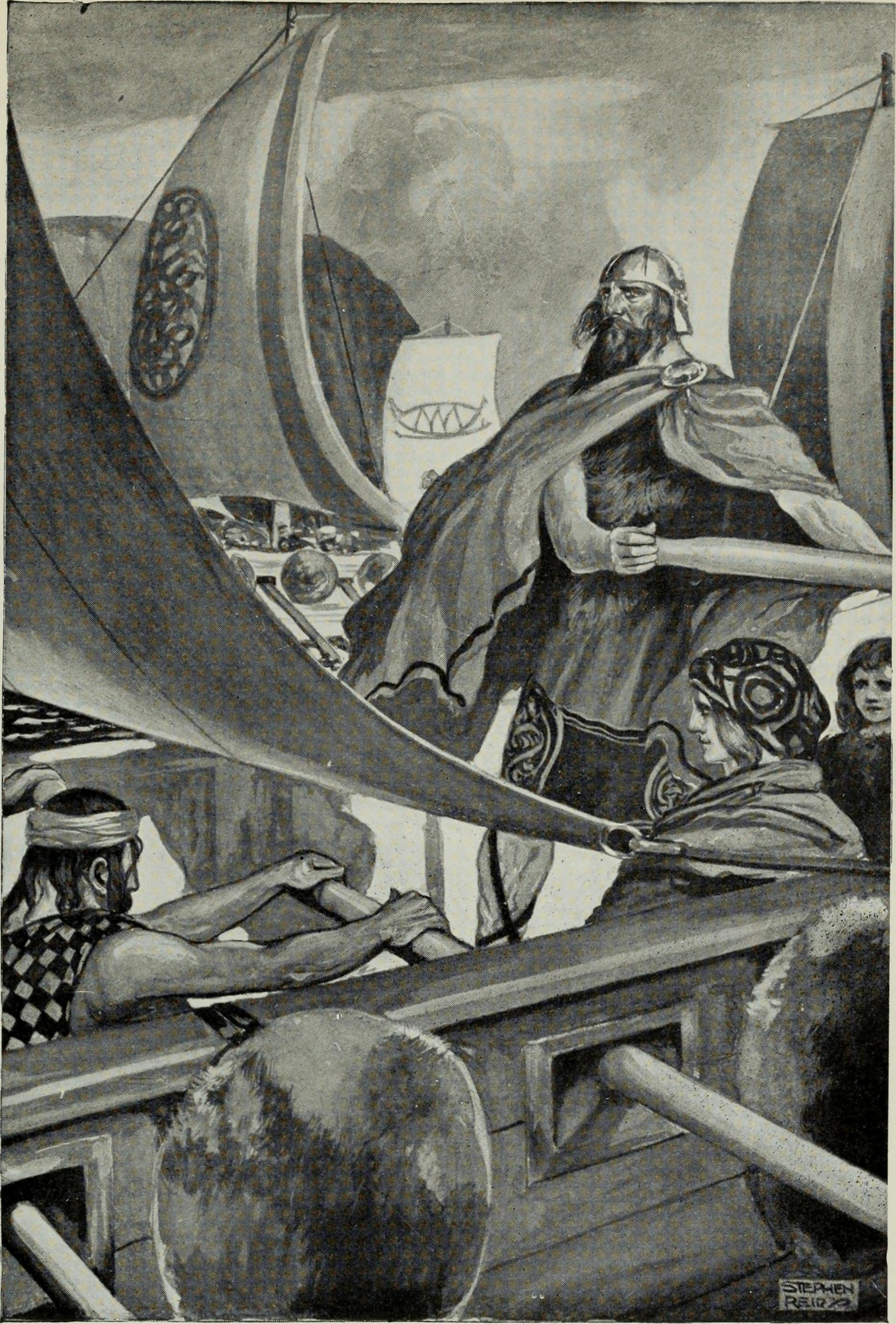
"The Coming of the Sons of Miled", illustration by Stephen Reid

The tale of the Gaels is now resumed. Íth, who has spied Ireland from the top of Breogán's Tower, sails to the island with a group of men. He travels to Aileach Néit where he meets Ireland's three kings: Mac Cuill, Mac Cecht and Mac Gréine of the Tuath Dé. However, he is killed by unnamed attackers and his men return to Iberia. The Gaels set sail with a great force to avenge his death and take Ireland. They are referred to here as the Sons of Míl Espáine (or Milesians). The name Míl Espáine comes from the Latin Miles Hispaniae ("soldier of Hispania"). After they land, they fight against the combined forces of the Tuath Dé and Fomorians. On their way to Tara, they are met on three mountains by the aforementioned Banba, Fódla and Ériu – the wives of Ireland's three kings. Each goddess asks that the Gaels name the land after her. One of the Gaels, Amergin, promises that it shall be so. At Tara, they meet the three kings, who defend their claim to the joint kingship of the land. They ask that there be a three-day truce, during which the Gaels must stay a distance of nine waves from land. The Gaels agree, but once their ships are nine waves from Ireland, the Tuath Dé conjure up a great wind that prevents them from sailing back to land. However, Amergin calms the wind by reciting a verse. The surviving ships return to land and the two groups agree to divide Ireland between them. The Gaels take the world above, while the Tuath Dé take the world below (i.e. the Otherworld) and enter the sídhe mounds.

In some versions of the Lebor Gabála, after the Gaels settle in Ireland, the ancestors of the Cruthin arrive in Ireland from Thracia. As they brought no women with them, they are allowed to take Gaelic wives, and then leave Ireland to settle in northern Britain, becoming the Picts.

=== Roll of the pagan kings of Ireland ===
Modelled on the Biblical Books of Kings, this chapter recounts the deeds of various kings of Ireland, most of them legendary or semi-legendary, from the time of Éber Finn and Érimón to the early 5th century of the Christian era.

=== Roll of the Christian kings of Ireland ===
A continuation of the previous chapter, it is the most accurate part of Lebor Gabála, being concerned with historical kings of Ireland whose deeds and dates are preserved in contemporary written records.

== Modern analysis ==
For many centuries, the Lebor Gabála was accepted as an accurate and reliable account of the history of Ireland. As late as the 17th century, Geoffrey Keating drew on it while writing his history of Ireland, Foras Feasa ar Éirinn, and it was also used extensively by the authors of the Annals of the Four Masters. Recently, however, the work has been subjected to greater critical scrutiny. One contemporary scholar has placed it in "the tradition of historical fabrication or pseudohistory"; another has written of its "generally spurious character" and has drawn attention to its many "fictions", while acknowledging that it "embodies some popular traditions". The Irish archaeologist R. A. Stewart Macalister, who translated the work into English, wrote: "There is not a single element of genuine historical detail, in the strict sense of the word, anywhere in the whole compilation". There is no evidence of large migrations to Ireland after the Bronze Age, either archaeologically or genetically.

The tale of the Gaels coming to Ireland is believed to be an invention of the Christian writers and an attempt to liken the Gaels to the Israelites. The claim of Scythian origins seems to be based on the superficial similarity of the names Scoti and Scythae. Other medieval pseudo-histories did likewise with other nations. For example, in his earlier History of the Goths, described by James Carey as "a model of barbarian pseudohistory", Isidore concludes that the Goths and Gets are related due to their similar names, and says that they (along with the Scythians) descend from Magog. The claim of Iberian origins may be based on three things: the coincidental similarity of the names Iberia and Hibernia, Isidore describing Iberia as the "mother[land] of the races", and Orosius describing Ireland as lying "between Iberia and Britain". The claim that the Gaels settled in the Maeotian marshes seems to have been taken from the Book of the History of the Franks, and their travels to Crete and Sicily may have been based on the tale of Aeneas. Other parts of the Lebor Gabála derive from pagan Gaelic mythology, most notably the divine Tuath Dé and the demonic Fomorians, who have been likened to the Æsir and Vanir of Norse mythology. It is suggested that the Nemedians' struggle against the Fomorians is "an echo of the primordial clash" between these two groups of supernatural beings, and that the Fir Bolg are the human equivalent of the Fomorians.

While most scholars view the work as primarily myth rather than history, some have argued that it is loosely based on real events. In the 1940s, T. F. O'Rahilly created a model of Irish prehistory based on his analysis of the Lebor Gabála and the early Irish language. He suggested that there were four waves of Celtic migrations or invasions: the Cruthin (c. 700–500 BC), the Érainn or Builg (c. 500 BC), the Laigin, Domnainn and Gálioin (c. 300 BC), and the Gaels (c. 100 BC). He argued that the first three groups spoke Brittonic languages. O'Rahilly believed some of the 'invasions' in Lebor Gabála are based on these, but that others were invented by the writers. He also argued that many of Ireland's 'pre-Gaelic' peoples continued to flourish for centuries after 100 BC. O'Rahilly's theory has been challenged by historians and archaeologists, and is no longer accepted. There is no evidence Brittonic speakers were the first inhabitants of Ireland and no evidence of a 'Gaelic invasion'.

In The White Goddess (1948), British poet and mythologist Robert Graves argued that myths brought to Ireland centuries before the introduction of writing were preserved and transmitted accurately by word of mouth before being written down in the Christian Era. Taking issue with Macalister, with whom he corresponded on this and other matters, he declared some of the Lebor Gabála's traditions "archaeologically plausible". The White Goddess has been the subject of much criticism by archaeologists and historians.

== Text ==
=== Translations ===
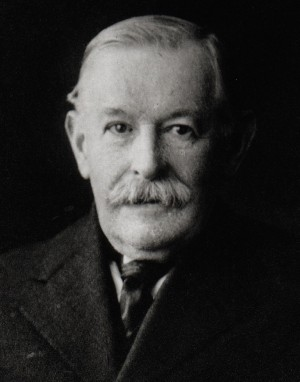
Robert Alexander Stewart Macalister's five-volume English translation of Lebor Gabála Érenn was published between 1938 and 1956.

- Macalister, R.A. Stewart (ed.), "Lebor Gabála Érenn – The Book of the Taking of Ireland", Irish Texts Society, Educational Company of Ireland
  - Macalister, R.A. Stewart, ed. (1938), Part I, vol. 34, Irish Texts Society, ISBN 1-870166-34-5
  - Macalister, R.A. Stewart, ed. (1939), Part II, vol. 35, ISBN 1-870166-35-3
  - Macalister, R.A. Stewart, ed. (1940), Part III, vol. 39, eIrish Texts Society, ISBN 1-870166-39-6
  - Macalister, R.A. Stewart, ed. (1941), Part IV, vol. 41, eIrish Texts Society, ISBN 1-870166-41-8
  - Macalister, R.A. Stewart, ed. (1956), Part V, vol. 44, Educational Company of Ireland, ISBN 1-870166-44-2
  - Macalister, R.A. Stewart, ed. (1916), O'Clery's Redaction

== See also ==
- Foras Feasa ar Éirinn, The History of Ireland, ca. 1634 by Geoffrey Keating
- Historia Brittonum, The History of the Britons, 9th century
- Historia Regum Britanniae, The History of the Kings of Britain, 12th century
- Historia de regibus Gothorum, Vandalorum et Suevorum, History of the Kings of the Goths, Vandals and Suevi, 7th century
- John O'Hart, author of Irish pedigrees (1892) – the book plots out most of the genealogy in Lebor Gabála Érenn
- Leabhar na nGenealach
- Frankish Table of Nations
