= Mac Gréine =

Irish mythological figure

In Irish mythology, Mac Gréine of the Tuatha Dé Danann was a son of Cermait, son of the Dagda. Mac Gréine's given name was Céthur. Mac Gréine is Irish for "Son of the Sun". His wife was Ériu.

== Description ==
He and his brothers Mac Cuill and Mac Cecht killed Lug in revenge for their father. The three brothers became joint High Kings of Ireland, rotating the sovereignty between them a year at a time, covering twenty-nine or thirty years depending on the source consulted. They were the last kings of the Tuatha Dé Danann before the coming of the Milesians. Mac Gréine and his brothers treacherously slew Íth, prompting his nephew Míl Espáine and his sons to invade Ireland for revenge. During the battle against the Milesians, Mac Gréine was slain by Amergin Glúingel.

== See also ==
- Deò-ghrèine
- Gráinne (given name)
- Grian
- Tuamgraney

Preceded by Fiacha	High King of Ireland (with Mac Cuill and Mac Cecht); AFM 1730–1700 BC; FFE 1317–1287 BC	Succeeded by Eber Finn and Érimón
