= Estrildis =

Mistress of King Locrinus of the Britons

Estrildis was the beloved mistress of King Locrinus of the Britons and the mother of his daughter Habren, according to the 12th-century chronicler Geoffrey of Monmouth.

== Medieval literature ==
In Geoffrey's pseudohistorical Historia Regum Britanniae (History of the Kings of Britain), Estrildis, the daughter of a king in Germania, was brought to Britain as a captive of Chief Humber the Hun during his invasion following the death of King Brutus. Eventually Humber's Huns were defeated by Brutus' three sons, the eldest of whom—Locrinus—fell in love with the beautiful Germanic princess upon discovering her in one of Humber's ships.

Locrinus was forced to honour his prior betrothal to Gwendolen, the daughter of King Corineus of Cornwall, but kept Estrildis as his mistress. For seven years he secretly visited her in a cave beneath Trinovantum (London, i.e., "New Troy"), where she was cared for by servants. Estrildis bore him a daughter, Habren.

When Corineus died, Locrinus deserted Gwendolen and their son Maddan and declared Estrildis his queen. Gwendolen retaliated by raising a Cornish army against Locrinus and defeating him in battle; she then had Estrildis and her daughter, Habren, drowned in a river thereafter called Hafren in Welsh and Sabrina by the Romans (which is the River Severn in English).

== Post-medieval literature ==
Elstridis and her story feature in Elstrild by Charles Tilney (d. 1586), The Faerie Queene (1590) by Edmund Spenser, The Complaynt of Elstred (1593) by Thomas Lodge, and Locrine (1887) by Swinburne.

A variant of the story is told by Oliver Mathews, in which Estrildis is called Sŵs-wên, and Locrinus builds Caersws for her.

The story went on to inspire the folktale of Rosamund Clifford, mistress of King Henry II, being hidden in an underground labyrinth.

== Name ==
Her name is probably a Latinized form of the medieval name Estrild (Old English: Éastorhild), which survived in England only until the 12th century, according to the 1984 Oxford Dictionary of English Christian Names.
