= Zambo, Ghana =

Coordinates: 10.6613°N 2.8200°W

Zambo, one of eight divisional group under the Lawra Traditional council, is a small town in the upper west region of Ghana. It is about 87.5 kilometres (54.4 miles) north of Wa, Ghana the regional capital. Found under the Lawra Municipal, it and nearby Eremon both claim to be the biggest village in the entire municipal. The people are mainly Dagaabas and they speak an indigenous language called Dagaare. The religion there is mainly Roman Catholicism and the traditional religion which has been there for ages (though Roman Catholicism is fast overshadowing it).

It is noted for its plentiful production of shea nuts, dawadawa, etc. from which cooking ingredients are derived, usually supplying the rest of the nation with it.

The main occupation of the residents is farming with most of the young people into second hand cloth businesses, selling of goats, cattle, sheep, etc. for their living.

== Education and health ==
There are about ten sub-sections of the village with one health post. The village lacks a senior high school with few basics schools. There has been an effort by the village leaders for government and non-governmental organizations to establish at least a senior high school for the area.
