= Amergin Glúingel =

Bard and judge for the Milesians

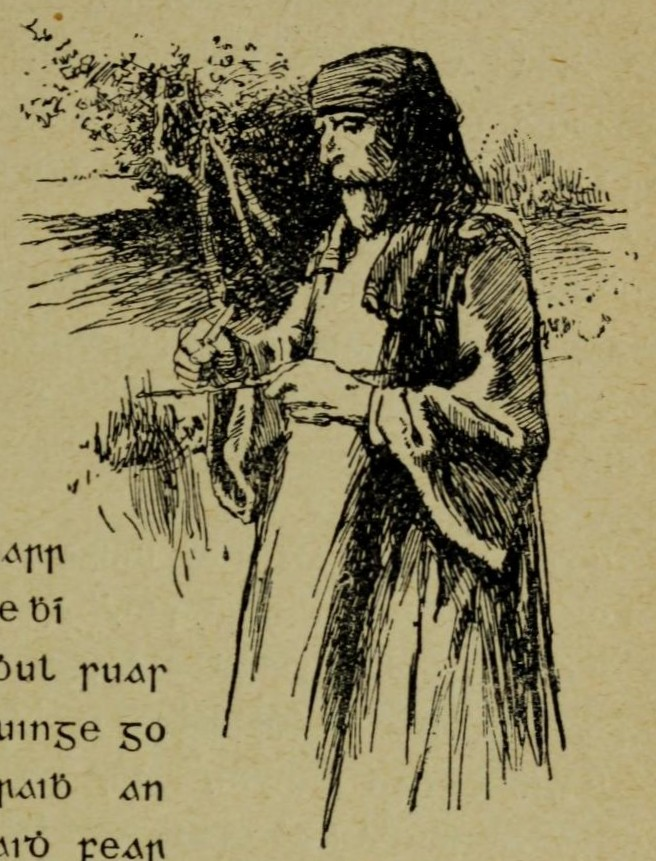
Amergin Glúingel (Seóirse Ua Fágáin, 1904)

Amergin Glúingel ("white knees") (also spelt Amhairghin Glúngheal) or Glúnmar ("big knee") is a bard and judge for the Milesians in the Irish Mythological Cycle. He was appointed Chief Ollam of Ireland by his two brothers, the kings of Ireland. A number of poems attributed to Amergin are part of the Milesian mythology.

== Legends ==
One of the seven sons of Míl Espáine, he took part in the Milesian conquest of Ireland from the Tuatha Dé Danann, in revenge for their great-uncle Íth, who had been treacherously killed by the three kings of the Tuatha Dé Danann, Mac Cuill, Mac Cecht and Mac Gréine. They landed at the estuary of Inber Scéne, named after Amergin's wife Scéne, who had died at sea. The three queens of the Tuatha Dé Danann (Banba, Ériu and Fódla) gave, in turn, permission for Amergin and his people to settle in Ireland. Each of the sisters required Amergin to name the island after each of them, which he did: Ériu is the origin of the modern name Éire, while Banba and Fódla are used as poetic names for Ireland, much as Albion is for Great Britain.

The Milesians had to win the island by engaging in battle with the three kings, their druids and warriors. Amergin acted as an impartial judge for the parties, setting the rules of engagement. The Milesians agreed to leave the island and retreat a short distance back into the ocean beyond the ninth wave, a magical boundary. Upon a signal, they moved toward the beach, but the druids of the Tuatha Dé Danann raised a magical storm to keep them from reaching land. However, Amergin sang an invocation calling upon the spirit of Ireland that has come to be known as "The Song of Amergin", and he was able to part the storm and bring the ship safely to land. There were heavy losses on all sides, with more than one major battle, but the Milesians carried the day. The three kings of the Tuatha Dé Danann were each killed in single combat by three of the surviving sons of Míl, Eber Finn, Érimón, and Amergin. In her Gods and Fighting Men (1904), Augusta, Lady Gregory, translates "The Song of Amergin" as such:

I am the wind on the sea;
I am the wave of the sea;
I am the stag of seven battles;
I am the eagle on the rock
I am a flash from the sun;
I am the most beautiful of plants;
I am a strong wild boar;
I am a salmon in the water;
I am a lake in the plain;
I am the word of knowledge;
I am the head of the spear in battle;
I am the god that puts fire in the head;
Who spreads light in the gathering on the hills?
Who can tell the ages of the moon?
Who can tell the place where the sun rests?

Amergin then divided the land between his two brothers, Eber taking the southern half of Ireland, Eremon the north. Within the year Érimón defeated Éber in battle and gained the kingship of the whole island. Local tradition in Drogheda locates his burial-place under Millmount.

Some of the early medieval Welsh poems on mythological themes attributed to the 6th-century poet Taliesin in the Book of Taliesin have similarities to those attributed to Amergin.

Preceded by New creation	Chief Ollam of Ireland; Mythical era	Succeeded by Lugh
