= Cermait =

Character in Irish mythology

In Irish mythology, Cermait (modern spelling: Cearmaid), also anglicized as or Kermit, of the Tuatha Dé Danann was a son of the Dagda and brother of Aed and Aengus. He was killed by Lugh after he had an affair with Lugh's wife Buach. The Dagda cried tears of blood for his son, and later, while traveling with his son's body in the east revived Cermait with a healing staff. Cermait's three sons, Mac Cuill, Mac Cecht and Mac Gréine, avenged his death, and went on to become joint High Kings of Ireland. Another figure mentioned in the Dindsenchas, Conan Honey-mouth, is described as the son of the Dagda and may be the same figure as Cermait. Conan was killed with a spear by a son of Conall Cernach named Ferdoman (also known as Aed Rind).

== Epithets ==
Cermait was known by the epithet Milbél (honey-mouth). Additional epithets associated with him include:

- "of the battle squadrons"
- "of form all fair"
- "the mighty"
