= Eremon =

Eremon, Ghana
- Country: Ghana
- Region: Upper West Region
- District: Lawra
- Festival: Eremon Senkaa Tigri (Eremon Groundnut Festival)

Eremon is a relatively small community located in the Lawra Municipality in the Upper West Region of Ghana. It is about 50 kilometers north of Wa the regional capital. It is the biggest subdistrict in the entire region. The people are mainly Dagaaba (from the Dagara tribe) and they speak an indigenous language called Dagaare.

History has it that the Dagaaba came all the way from Mali to settle in present-day Ghana and Burkina Faso. The distribution of the Dagaaba between the two countries is due to the partitioning of Africa by Colonialists in the 16th century.

The predominant religion there is Christianity with the main denomination being Roman Catholic. Although some still practise the African Traditional Religion, Christianity is fast overshadowing it.

The main economic activity in the community is agriculture. Eremon is credited as the largest cultivator of groundnut in Ghana. To further promote and market groundnut production in the community, the people of Eremon in 2014 instituted a groundnut festival (known in the native language as 'Senkaa Tigre'). Since then, it has become an annual event. The festival is celebrated on the last Sunday of December. It is usually characterised by a display of harvested groundnut, groundnut related menus and Bawaa dance. Although the festival began few years ago, it is attracting tourists from abroad, especially Europe.

In addition to the festival, the community can boast of a number of tourist sites. Major among them are Kokola ( a river god), Upper Tang (a mountain god) and about five crocodile ponds. The crocodile population is unknown, but traditionally, the inhabitants correlate it with the over 4,000 Naayiree in Eremon. The crocodiles are the totem of the Naayiree. It is said that the crocodiles once led their ancestors to a source of water during the Babatu and Samuore war. For saving their lives, the people vowed never to eat a crocodile. Eremon is also noted for its plentiful production of shea nuts, a nut from which cooking oil is derived, usually supplying the rest of the nation with it.

== Conflict ==
It is currently in a cold conflict with a neighbouring community Zambo, Ghana, to the west. The dispute is over whose land an A Senior High School is sited. Zambo claims that the Senior High School is located on their land, and thus should have been named as Zambo Senior High School but not Eremon Senior High School as it is officially captured. The contestation started in the late 1990s, meanwhile, the school existed as far back as the 1980s and has since been recognized officially as Eremon Senior High Technical School. The question as to why the forebears of the Zambo people did not contest the name of the school but the present generation does remains unknown. As it stands the school is still officially recognised as Eremon Senior High School.
