= Brath (mythology) =

Brath was a mythical character from the Lebor Gabála Érenn and is the son of Deag. He also is thought to be the father of Breogán and an ancestor of the people of Ireland. He is also thought to have died in conquest of Iberia. Beyond being an important character in Irish genealogy not much is known about his life.
