= Mac Cecht =

Character of Irish mythology

In Irish mythology, Mac Cecht (lit. 'son of the ploughshare'; Irish: Mac Ceacht, [ˌmˠak ˈcaxt̪ˠ], mok cokht) of the Tuatha Dé Danann was a son of Cermait, son of the Dagda. Mac Cecht's given name was Téthur and he was named Mac Cecht after his god, Cecht, the ploughshare. His wife was Fódla, one of the three eponymous sister-goddesses of Ireland.

== Description ==
He and his brothers Mac Cuill and Mac Gréine killed Lug in revenge for their father. The three brothers became joint High Kings of Ireland, rotating the sovereignty between them a year at a time, covering twenty-nine or thirty years depending on the source consulted. They were the last kings of the Tuatha Dé Danann before the coming of the Milesians. Mac Cecht and his brothers treacherously slew Íth, prompting his nephew Míl Espáine and his sons to invade Ireland for revenge. During the battle against the Milesians, Mac Cecht was slain by Érimón

Preceded by Fiacha	High King of Ireland (with Mac Cuill and Mac Gréine); AFM 1730–1700 BC; FFE 1317–1287 BC	Succeeded by Eber Finn and Érimón
