= Fir Domnann =

Legendary Irish people

The Fir Domnann were a people named in Irish legendary history.

The name Fir Domnann is based on the root dumno-, which means both 'deep' and 'the world'. The suffix -on- often occurs in Gaulish and British divine names. The tribal name Dumnonii, found in Britain, would therefore mean 'people of the god of the world'. Old Irish fir means 'men', and so Fir Domnann had the same meaning as the British tribal name, leading to conjecture that these tribes had a common origin. For example, O'Rahilly's historical model proposed that the Domnann were a P-Celtic, pre-Goidelic people who, along with the Galeóin, invaded the south-east coast of Ireland from Britain. O'Rahilly's theory of P-Celtic preceding Goidelic in Ireland is not widely accepted by experts today, but the idea of some connection between the British and Irish tribes of similar names remains.

In early Irish literature, the Fir Domnann were located in Cóice Laigean (Leinster). A probably 7th-century Irish poem credits their ruler, Mess-Telmann, with the over-kingship of the province and with wielding power from the royal site of Leinster at Dún Áilinne. The place-name Inber Domnann, now Malahide Bay inlet in north County Dublin on the east coast of Ireland, preserves the tribal name. Yet the area with the strongest placename associations with the Fir Domnann is in north-west Mayo: the Iorrais Domnann, from which the historical barony of Erris takes its name, and the nearby Mag Domnann and Dún Domnann.
