= Mac Cuill =

Son of Cermait in Irish mythology

In Irish mythology, Mac Cuill of the Tuatha Dé Danann, was a son of Cermait, son of the Dagda. Mac Cuill's given name was Éthur and he was named Mac Cuill after his god, Coll, the hazel. His wife was Banba.

== Description ==
He and his brothers Mac Cecht and Mac Gréine killed Lug in revenge for their father. The three brothers became joint High Kings of Ireland, rotating the sovereignty between them a year at a time, covering twenty-nine or thirty years depending on the source consulted. They were the last kings of the Tuatha Dé Danann before the coming of the Milesians. Mac Cuill and his brothers treacherously slew Íth, prompting his nephew Míl Espáine and his sons to invade Ireland for revenge. During the battle against the Milesians, Mac Cuill was slain by Eber Finn.

Preceded by Fiacha	High King of Ireland (with Mac Cecht and Mac Gréine); AFM 1730–1700 BC; FFE 1317–1287 BC	Succeeded by Eber Finn and Eremon
