= Milesians (Irish) =

Mythical race that settled in Ireland

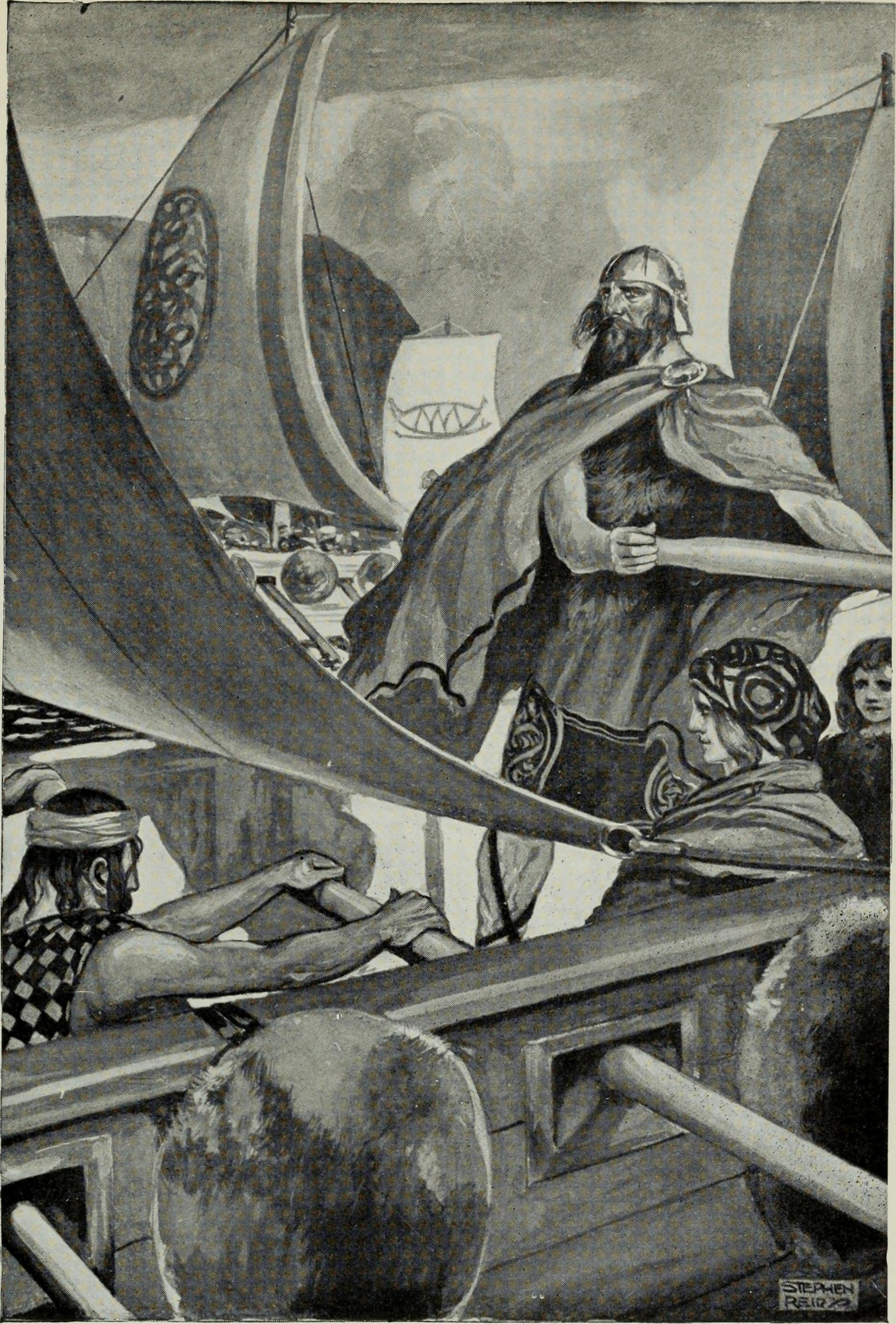
"The Coming of the Sons of Miled", illustration by Stephen Reid in T. W. Rolleston's Myths & Legends of the Celtic Race, 1911

The Milesians or sons of Míl are the final race to settle in Ireland, according to the Lebor Gabála Érenn, a medieval Irish Christian history. The Milesians represent the Irish people. They are Gaels who sail to Ireland from Iberia (Hispania) after spending hundreds of years travelling the Earth. When they land in Ireland, they contend with the Tuatha Dé Danann, who represent the Irish pantheon of gods. The two groups agree to divide Ireland between them: the Milesians take the world above, while the Tuath Dé Danann take the world below (i.e. the Otherworld). Scholars believe that the tale is mostly an invention of medieval Christian writers.

== Myth ==
=== Historia Brittonum ===
The 9th century Latin work Historia Brittonum (History of the Britons) says that Ireland was settled by three groups of people from the Iberian Peninsula. The first are the people of Partholón, who all die of plague. The second are the people of Nemed, who eventually return to Iberia. The last group are led by three sons of a warrior or soldier from Hispania (mīles Hispaniae), who sail to Ireland with thirty ships, each carrying thirty wives. They see a glass tower in the middle of the sea with men on top of it, but the men do not answer their calls. They set out to take the tower, but when they reach it, all but one of their ships are sunk by a great wave. Only one ship is saved, and its passengers are the ancestors of all the Irish. In later Irish texts, it is the people of Nemed who are drowned while trying to capture a tower by the sea.

=== Lebor Gabála Érenn ===
The Lebor Gabála Érenn (The Book of the Taking of Ireland), an Irish work which was first compiled in the 11th century AD by an anonymous writer, purports to be a history of Ireland and the Irish (the Gaels). It tells us that all mankind is descended from Adam through the sons of Noah, and that a Scythian king named Fénius Farsaid (descendant of Noah's son Japheth) is the forebear of the Gaels. Fénius, a prince of Scythia, is described as one of 72 chieftains who built the Tower of Babel. His son Nel weds Scota, daughter of an Egyptian pharaoh, and they have a son named Goídel Glas. Goídel crafts the Goidelic (Gaelic) language from the original 72 languages that arose after the confusion of tongues. Goídel's offspring, the Goidels (Gaels), leave Egypt at the same time as the Exodus of the Israelites and settle in Scythia. After some time they leave Scythia and spend 440 years wandering the Earth, undergoing a series of trials and tribulations akin to those of the Israelites, who were said to have spent 40 years wandering in the wilderness. In some versions of the Lebor Gabála, there was a succession dispute between Refloir and Míl (also called Galam) over the kingship of Scythia. Míl kills Refloir, and is exiled for this kin-slaying.

Eventually, Míl and his followers reach Iberia/Hispania by sea and conquer it. There, Goídel's descendant Breogán founds a city called Brigantia, and builds a tower from the top of which his son Íth glimpses Ireland. Brigantia refers to Corunna (then known as Brigantium) in modern-day Galicia in Spain, and Breogán's tower is likely to have been based on the Tower of Hercules, which was built at Corunna by the Romans.

Íth sails to the island with a group of men. He is welcomed by its three kings: Mac Cuill, Mac Cecht and Mac Gréine. These three are members of the Tuatha Dé Danann, who ruled Ireland at the time. Evidence suggests that Tuath Dé were the main pagan gods of Ireland. Íth is then killed by unnamed attackers and his men return to Iberia. The eight sons of Íth's brother Míl (also called Míl Espáine, 'of Hispania'), lead an invasion force to avenge his death and take Ireland. After they land, they fight against the Tuath Dé and make for Tara, the royal capital. On the way, they are met on three mountains by Banba, Fódla and Ériu – the wives of Ireland's three kings. They are believed to have been a trio of land goddesses. Each woman says that the Gaels will have good fortune if they name the land after her. One of the Gaels, Amergin, promises that it shall be so. At Tara, they meet the three kings, who defend their claim to the joint kingship of the land. They ask that there be a three-day truce, during which the Gaels must stay a distance of nine waves from land. The Gaels agree, but once their ships are nine waves from Ireland, the Tuath Dé conjure up a great wind that prevents them sailing back to land. However, Amergin calms the wind by reciting a verse. The surviving ships return to land and the two groups agree to divide Ireland between them. The Gaels take the world above, while the Tuath Dé take the world below (i.e. the Otherworld) and enter the sídhe, the ancient burial mounds that dot the Irish landscape.

Amergin divides the kingship between Éremon, who rules the northern half of Ireland, and Éber Finn, who rules the southern half. This division of the land was probably invented by the writers to explain and justify the 7th/8th-century division between the royal capitals of Tara and Cashel. The Lebor Gabála then traces Ireland's dynasties back to Milesian Gaels such as Éremon and Éber. Modern scholars, however, believe that these were fictional characters and that the writers were attempting to give the medieval dynasties more legitimacy.

== Analysis ==
Modern scholars believe that the tale is mostly an invention of medieval Irish Christian writers. They sought to link the Irish to people and events from the Old Testament, to liken the Irish to the Israelites, and to reconcile native pagan myth with Christianity. They were inspired by other medieval Christian pseudo-histories, such as Galician cleric Paulus Orosius's History Against the Pagans, Saint Jerome's Chronicle, and the works of Isidore.

The claim that the Irish Gaels came from the Iberian region of Galicia may be based on three things. The first is the coincidental similarity of the names Iberia/Hiberia and Hibernia and the names Galicia and Gael. Medieval pseudo-historians made similar claims about other nations based only on their names. The second is Isidore of Seville describing Iberia as the "mother[land] of the races". Isidore's works were a major source of inspiration for the writers of the Lebor Gabála. The third is Orosius describing Ireland as lying "between Iberia and Britain". The Roman historian Tacitus also thought that Ireland lay between Iberia and Britain. John Carey notes that if Iberia was thought to be the part of mainland Europe nearest to Ireland, it would be natural "to see it as the source of arrivals from overseas".

The name Míl Espáine is a Gaelicization of the Latin mīles Hispaniae, "warrior/soldier of Hispania", first attested in the Historia Brittonum. Some antiquarians linked the Irish 'Milesians' with the ancient Greek Milesians, inhabitants of Miletus. However, Joseph Lennon writes that "no link exists among Míl, Milesians and Miletus in the early origin legends". He considers it more likely that the name 'Milesian' came from later English-language translations of the legend, noting "'Milesian' is not used to refer to the Irish with any regularity until the eighteenth century".

The names of some of the Milesians were invented by medieval writers, based on the ethnic names of the Gaels: Goidel Glas (from Goídel), Fenius (from Féni), Scota (from Scoti), Éber (from Hiberni), Éremon and Ír (from Éire).

== Legacy ==
Professor Dáithí Ó hÓgain writes that the "account of how the sons of Míl took Ireland was a literary fabrication, but it was accepted as conventional history by poets and scholars down until the 19th century". For centuries, the legend was used in Ireland to win and secure dynastic and political legitimacy. For example, in his Two bokes of the histories of Ireland (1571), Edmund Campion tried to use the myth to establish an ancient right of the British monarch to rule Ireland. In A View of the Present State of Ireland, Edmund Spenser accepted and rejected various parts of the myth both to denigrate the Irish of his day and to justify English colonisation of Ireland in the 1590s (at the height of the Anglo-Spanish war).

The myth was cited during the Contention of the bards, which lasted from 1616 to 1624. During this period poets from the north and south of the island extolled the merits of the dynasties that gave them patronage, and attacked the dynasties from the other half of the island.

Geoffrey Keating's Foras Feasa ar Éirinn (written c.1634) used the myth to promote the legitimacy of the Stuart claim to royal authority in Ireland (related to the origin of the Lia Fáil), demonstrating that Charles I was descended, through Brian Boru, Éber and Galamh, from Noah and, ultimately, from Adam. In the early modern period many Irishmen and women fled to Spain as a result of political and military turmoil in their homeland. The belief that the Gaelic Irish were descended from Míl Espáine and his Spanish followers was current in Spain as well as Ireland, and as a result the Irish in Spain were given all the rights and privileges due to Spanish subjects, such as automatic citizenship granted to Irish Catholics who made it to Spanish territory.

Among the many theories regarding Stone of Scone origins, Medieval Scottish lawyer Baldred Bisset put forward the theory that it was transported from ancient Egypt via the Iberian Peninsula or Celtiberia to Ireland by Scota, the daughter of an Egyptian Pharaoh, who was also the wife of Goídel Glas, an ancestor of the Milesians. The stone has been associated to Lia Fail of the Hill of Tara, which was used as an Irish High Kings' Inauguration Stone. According to Bisset, Scota along with a band of Irish warriors later invaded Scotland taking her Royal seat with her. Ultimately it was confiscated by Edward I of England through conquest.

== See also ==
- Gallaeci
- Míl Espáine

== Footnotes ==
Preceded by Tuatha Dé Danann	Mythical invasions of Ireland; AFM 1700 BC; FFE 1287 BC	Succeeded by none
