= Humber the Hun =

Legendary figure

Humber the Hun was a legendary king of so-called "Huns" who, according to Geoffrey of Monmouth's pseudohistorical chronicle Historia Regum Britanniae, invaded the British Isles in about the 12th century BC from Scythia. His people successfully conquered Alba but he himself was drowned in the river named Humber after him during his campaign against Southern Britain. His descendants became the legendary kings of Pictland.

== Mediaeval literature ==
According to Geoffrey, following the division of Britain amongst Locrinus, Kamber, and Albanactus, Humber invaded Albany (which then covered all the lands north of the Humber) and killed Albanactus in open battle. The remaining natives fled south where Locrinus allied with Kamber and defeated Humber near a river in which Humber was drowned. The river, which was thereafter known as the Humber, marked the southern border of the Kingdom of Northumbria and is one of the main rivers of England.

When Locrinus raided Humber's ships after his death, he found Humber's consort Estrildis, the daughter of the King of Germany there. Thus Humber's Huns were able to settle Britain with their Queen Estrildis eventually marrying Locrinus. The River Severn was named after her daughter Hafren.

== Post-mediaeval literature ==
The war between Humber and Locrinus was retold in many histories, poems and dramas. Dramatic works include the play Locrine (1591; published 1595 under the initials W.S.).
Poetry includes The Faerie Queene (1590) by Edmund Spenser; "An old Ballad of a Duke of Cornwall's Daughter", published in a 1726 collection of old ballads; and the introduction to the poem The revenge of Guendolen (circa 1786) by J.J. Proby.
Historical accounts include the eighteenth century works The history of Great-Britain, from the first inhabitants thereof, 'till the death of Cadwalader, last king of the Britains; and of the Kings of Scotland to Eugenev (1701) by John Lewis; The naval history of Britain, from the earliest periods of which there are accounts in history, to the conclusion of the year M.DCC.LVI. (1756); and A new and complete history of England, from the first settlement of Brutus, upwards of one thousand years before Julius Cæsar, to the year 1793 (1791-1794) by Charles Alfred Ashburton.

== Interpretation ==
A medieval studies scholar has pointed out that medieval maps of Britain represent a conception of a land divided by the rivers Humber and Severn into three realms. The river names, she suggests, are associated with legendary figures who attempt to transgress boundaries, in this case an invading king, who are destroyed by the water that defines the limits.

== In pop culture ==
Modern Ulster Scots and other Scots Protestants are still referred to as Huns by Irish Catholics.
