= Eber Finn =

Legendary High King of Ireland

Éber Finn
- High King of Ireland
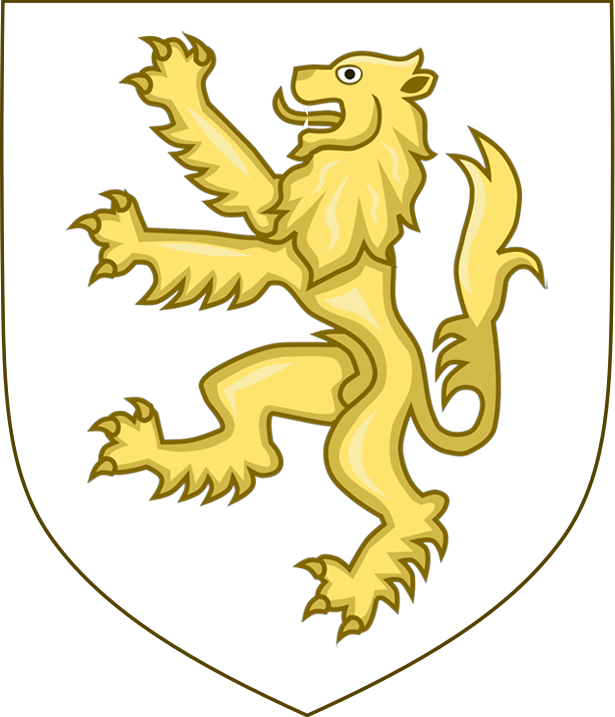
- The Golden Lion of Heber Fionn
- Reign: c. 1684–1670 BC
- Coronation: Hill of Tara
- Predecessor: Mac Cuill, Mac Cecht, Mac Gréine
- Successor: Érimón
- Born: unknown Ireland
- Died: c. 1670 BC; Ireland
- House: Milesian
- Father: Míl Espáine
- Mother: Scota
- Religion: Celtic polytheism

Éber Finn (modern spelling: Éibhear Fionn), son of Míl Espáine, was, according to medieval Irish legend and historical tradition, a High King of Ireland and one of the founders of the Milesian lineage, to which medieval genealogists traced all the important Gaelic royal lines.

According to the Lebor Gabála Érenn, the ancestors of the Gaels were living in the Iberian Peninsula, ruled by two of the sons of Míl, Éber Donn and Érimón. After Míl's uncle Íth made a voyage to Ireland but was murdered by its three kings, Mac Cuill, Mac Cécht and Mac Gréine of the Tuatha Dé Danann, the seven sons of Míl led an invasion in thirty-six ships. They landed in County Kerry and fought their way to Tara. On the way, the wives of the three kings, Ériu, Banba and Fodla, requested that the island be named after them: Ériu is the earlier form of the modern name Éire, and Banba and Fodla were often used as poetic names for Ireland, much as Albion is for Britain.

At Tara the sons of Míl met the three kings, and it was decreed that the invaders return to their ships and sail a distance of nine waves from Ireland, and if they were able to land again, Ireland would be theirs. They set sail, but the Tuatha Dé used magic to brew up a storm, in which five of the sons were drowned, leaving only Éber Finn, Érimón and Amergin the poet, to land and take the island in the Battle of Tailtiu. Amergin divided the kingship between Érimón, who ruled the northern half, and Éber Finn, the southern.

A year after the Battle of Tailtiu, Éber Finn became unhappy with his half, fought a battle against his brother at Airgetros, lost and was killed. Érimón became sole ruler of Ireland. The High Kingship would alternate between the descendants of Éber Finn and the descendants of Érimón. Éber's sons included Conmáel, Ér, Orba, Ferón and Fergna.

Geoffrey Keating dates his reign to 1287 BC, the Annals of the Four Masters to 1700 BC.

Preceded by Mac Cuill, Mac Cecht and Mac Gréine	High King of Ireland (with Érimón); AFM 1700 BC; FFE 1287–1286 BC	Succeeded by Érimón (alone)
