= Míl Espáine =

Mythical ancestor of the final inhabitants of Ireland

- Ancestor of the Gaels; Legendary leader of the Milesians
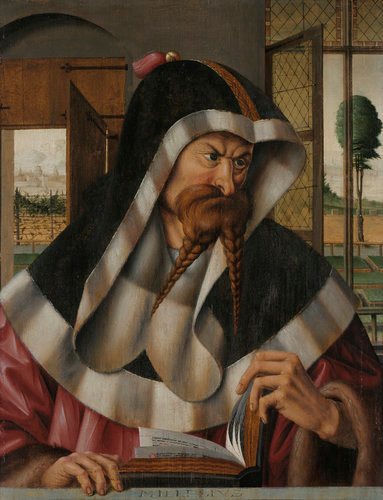
- Milesius, 16th century Renaissance artistic rendering by Hermann tom Ring held in the Bavarian State Painting Collections
- Abode: Spain (traditional)
- Gender: male

Genealogy
- Parents: Bile, son of Breoghan
- Consorts: Scota, Seang
- Children: Érimón, Éber Finn, Amergin Glúingel, and others
- Dynasty: Progenitor of the Milesian High Kings of Ireland

In Irish origin myths, Míl Espáine or Míl Espáne (later Latinized as Milesius) is the mythical ancestor of the final inhabitants of Ireland, the "sons of Míl" or Milesians, who represent the vast majority of the Irish Gaels. His father was Bile, son of Breogan. Modern historians believe he is a creation of medieval Irish Christian writers.

== Name and origin ==
Mark Williams characterises the name Míl Espáine as an "etymological figment" translated from the Latin mīles Hispaniae, meaning "soldier of Hispania", attested in a passage (§ 13) in the 9th-century work Historia Brittonum ("The History of the Britons") by Nennius.

As A. G. van Hamel has suggested, the status of Iberia as the land of origin can be traced back to Isidore of Seville, who in the introduction to his history of the Goths, Vandals and Suebi had elevated Iberia/Hispania to the "mother of all races". Another likely reason the Irish were said to come from Iberia was the mistaken belief that Hibernia, the Latin name of Ireland, came from Iberia/Hiberia. A further explanation may lie in the mistake made by some classical geographers in locating Ireland closely opposite Iberia. For instance, the Lebar Gabála (§ 100) recounts that from Bregon's Tower, the Milesian Íth was able to see right across the sea to Ireland. In Galician history, that tower is the Tower of Hercules in A Coruña, Galicia.

== Legend ==
=== Historia Brittonum ===
The earliest surviving mention of the character is from the 9th century Historia Brittonum (History of the Britons). It says that Ireland was settled by three groups of people from the Iberian Peninsula. The first group are the people of Partholón, who all die of plague. The second group are the people of Nemed, who eventually return to Iberia. The third group are led by three sons of a warrior of Hispania (tres filii militis Hispaniae), who sail to Ireland with thirty ships, each carrying thirty wives. They see a glass tower in the middle of the sea with men on top of it, but the men do not answer their calls. The Milesians set out to take the tower, but when they reach it, all but one of their ships are sunk by a great wave. Only one ship is saved, and its passengers are the ancestors of all the Irish. In the Lebor Gabála, it is the people of Nemed who are drowned while trying to capture a tower by the sea.

=== Lebor Gabála Érenn ===
The earliest version of the Irish Lebor Gabála Érenn (Book of the Taking of Ireland) was compiled in the 11th century. It says that Ireland was settled by six groups of people: the people of Cessair, the people of Partholón, the people of Nemed, the Fir Bolg, the supernatural Tuatha Dé Danann, and lastly the sons of Míl Espáine, an Irish borrowing of the Latin mīles Hispaniae.

The Lebor Gabála traces the Irish back to the Scythians and further back to Japheth, one of the sons of Noah. It says that Míl was born in Iberia and was the son of Bilé, son of Breogán. Some versions say Míl's birth name was Golam.

According to some versions, Míl returns to Scythia, the land of his forebears, where he becomes an army commander. He then spends some time in Egypt, where he marries Scota, a daughter of the pharaoh. Míl eventually returns to Iberia, where he wins several great battles before dying there.

One of Míl's relatives, Íth, visits Ireland but is killed there by the Tuatha Dé Danann. Míl's eight sons—Éber Finn, Éber Donn, Érimón, Ír, Érannan, Amergin, Colptha and Airech—sail to Ireland and take possession of it from the Tuatha Dé Danann.

== Offspring ==
Among the sons of Míl in Ireland were Éber Finn, Érimón, Ír and Amergin. The traditional genealogies of Gaelic Ireland and Gaelic Scotland trace the ancestors of the Gaels back to one of the first three sons. Typically, the descendants of Éber Finn were prominent in Munster (including the Eóganachta, Uí Fidgenti and Uí Liatháin), the progeny of Ír, through his son Éber formed the bulk of Ulster (including the Ulaidh; Dál nAraidi, Conmhaicne, Ciarraige and Corco Mruad) and then offspring of Érimón were most powerful in Connacht, Leinster and parts of Ulster (including the Connachta, Uí Néill, Osraige, Clan Colla, Uí Maine, Laighin, Dalcassians and the Érainn).

According to John O'Hart in Irish Pedigrees (1876), in his younger days, Milesius, while travelling through Africa, is said to have killed three lions and subsequently bore three lions as his symbol. Each of the lions were borne by his progeny: Heber Fionn and Heremon (as well as their descendants) bore the gold and red lions respectively, while his grandson Heber mac Ír bore the blue lion.

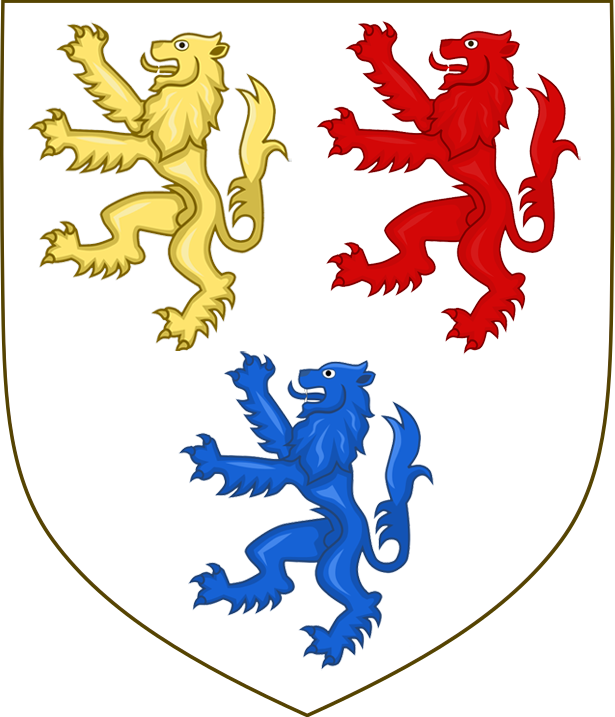
Lions of Milesius.

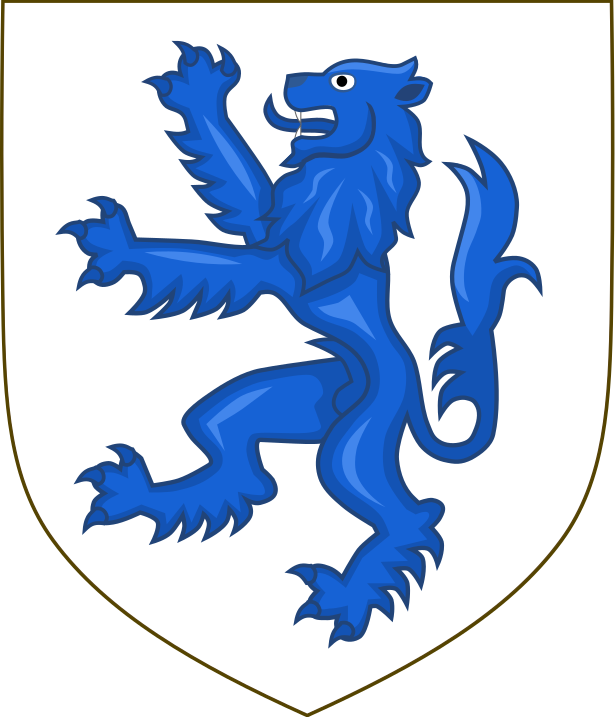
Lion of Heber mac Ír.

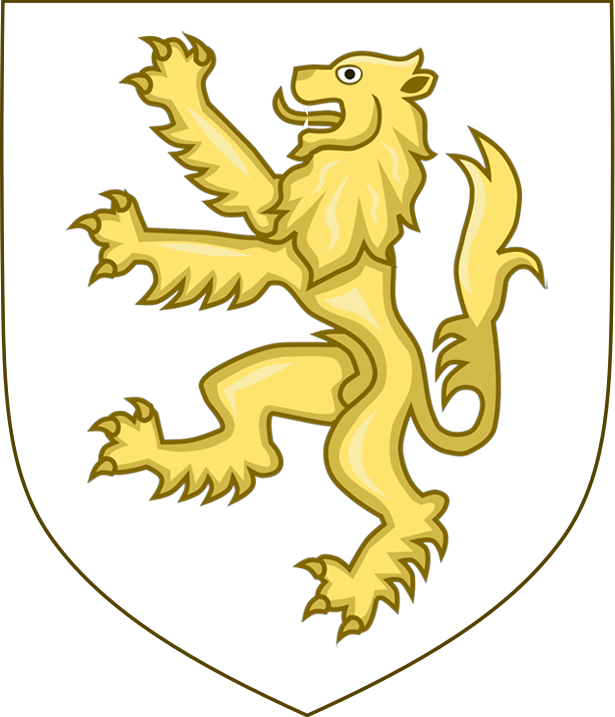
Lion of Heber Fionn.

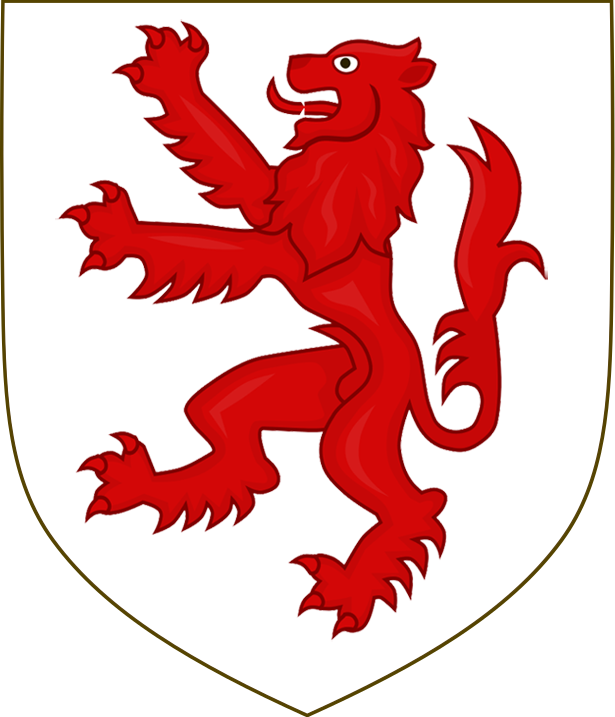
Lion of Heremon.

== See also ==
- Lebor Gabála Érenn
- Mesca Ulad
- Milesians
- Scota
