= Breogán =

Legendary ancestor of the Irish Gaels

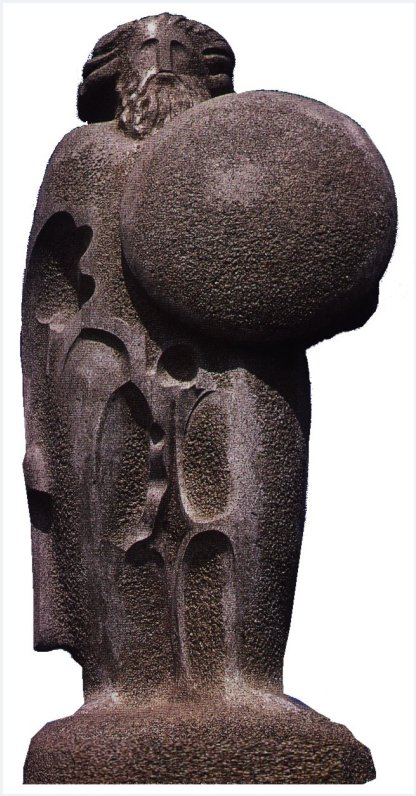
Breogán statue in A Coruña

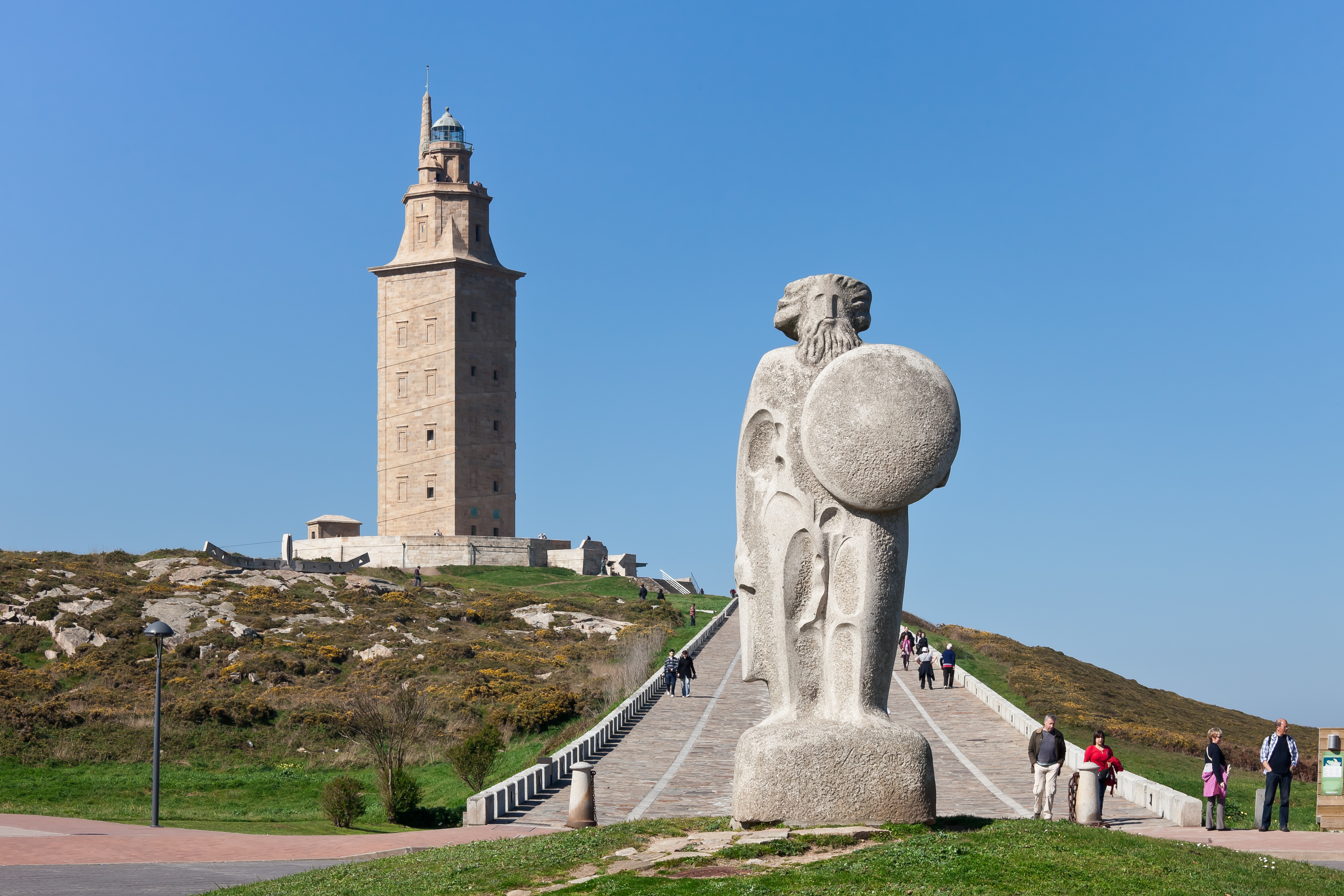
Breogán statue and the Tower of Hercules in A Coruña, Spain

Breogán (also spelt Breoghan, Bregon or Breachdan) is a character in the Lebor Gabála Érenn, a medieval Christian history of Ireland and the Irish (or Gaels). He is supposedly the son of Brath, and is described as an ancestor of the Gaels. The Lebor Gabála purports to be an account of how the Gaels descend from Adam through the sons of Noah and how they came to Ireland.

It tells us that they spent 440 years wandering the Earth and underwent a series of trials and tribulations. Eventually, they sail to Iberia and conquer it. There, one of their leaders, Breogán, founds a city called Brigantia and builds a great tower. From the top of the tower, his son Íth glimpses Ireland. The Gaels, including some of Breogán's sons, sail to Ireland from Brigantia and agree to divide it between them and the Tuatha Dé Danann, the Irish pagan gods, who take the Otherworld. Brigantia probably refers to A Coruña in present-day Galicia and Breogán's tower is probably based on the Tower of Hercules (which was built at A Coruña by the Romans) or the Tower of Babel. The idea that the Irish Gaels came from Hispania may be based on the similarity of the names Iberia and Hibernia and the names Galicia and Gael. Medieval pseudo-historians made similar claims about other nations based on their names. A similar story about a monk who voyaged to a marvelous island he saw from the top of the tower of Brigantia was written in the first years of the eleventh century in Galicia. The story, preserved in two 14th-century manuscripts, is known as Trezenzonii de Solistitionis Insula Magna ("Trezenzonius' Great Island of the Solstice"). His son was Bile, who was in turn the father of Milesius (also called Míl Espáine, soldier of Hispania or Spain), said to be the ancestor of the Irish people. Although this is generally regarded as myth, the conquering of Ireland by people coming from the Iberian peninsula in prehistoric times fits in with a genetic study conducted in 2006 at Oxford University, which concluded that the majority of people in the British Isles are actually descended from neolithic farmers coming from the coastal north regions of Spain.

The Lebor Gabála was a hugely popular and influential work. Galicia itself is sometimes described poetically as the "Home" or "Nation" of Breogán (in Galician, the fogar or nazón de Breogán). The land is so described in the anthem of Galicia, "Os Pinos". A large statue of Breogán stands near the Tower of Hercules in Coruña. The professional basketball club of the Galician city of Lugo is called CB Breogán in its honour. In the Spanish capital Madrid, there is a park called Parque de Breogán, named after this legendary figure.

== Sons ==
Breogán had nine other sons besides Bile father of Milesius. Of these, Íoth came to Ireland first and was murdered by the sons of Cermait, prompting his family to arrive for revenge. Íoth's son Lughaidh is commemorated in the placename Corca Luighe, and Íoth's brothers in other placenames: Breogha, Cuailgne, Muirtheimhne, and Cualu in the territories of their descendant peoples; Fuad, Bladh, and Eibhle in mountains (Sliabh Fuaid in the Fews, Slieve Bloom, and Slieve Felim respectively) and Nár in "Ros Náir" in Slieve Bloom and "Cathair Náir" in Slieve Mish. Through Bile, Breogán is the 46th great-grandfather of Conn Cétchathach and thus the ancestor of the Connachta, if the legends are to be believed.
