= Tomb of Joshua =

Biblical figure tomb in the West Bank

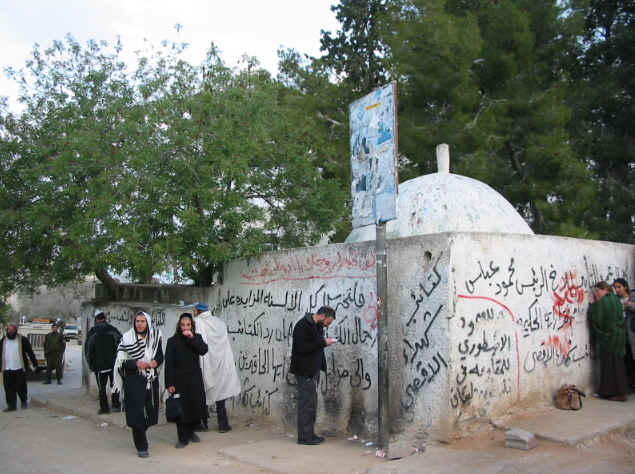
- Tomb of Joshua according to Jewish tradition, Kifl Haris, West Bank

- Location within the West Bank
- 32.118617°N 35.15695°E
- Type: Mausoleum
- Location: Kifl Hares, West Bank

The Tomb of Joshua (Hebrew: קבר יהושע בן נון), i.e. the burial site of the biblical figure Joshua, and that of his companion Caleb are, according to a Samaritan tradition noted in 1877, at Kifl Haris in the West Bank. Religious Jews also identify one of the mausolea at Kifl Haris with that of Joshua and thousands of them go there on pilgrimage on the annual commemoration of his death, 26th of Nisan on the Hebrew calendar.

== Significance ==
=== Judaism and Christianity ===
According to the biblical book bearing his name, Joshua died at the age of 110 and his burial site was in a location of his own inheritance at Timnath-serah, which is in the hill country of the Tribe of Ephraim, north of the mountain of Gaash (Joshua 24:30). Timnath-serah, or Timnath-heres, has been identified by some with the Palestinian village of Kifl Hares, while many place it at Khirbet Tibnah.

=== Islam ===
There are many local Islamic traditions locating the tomb of Joshua, known in Islam as "Nabi Yusha." The locations include Joshua's Hill in Istanbul, Turkey, the Maqam Nabi Yusha' mosque at Jordan, the village of Al-Nabi Yusha' in Safed and several other sites in Iran and Lebanon (including Miniyeh).

== History ==
The mausoleum at Kifl Haris seen by Jews as the Tomb of Joshua, is known to Muslims as the Maqam of Yusha' ibn Nun (مقام يوشع بن نون; Shrine of Joshua, son of Nun) and as the Maqam of the Servant of Salah ad-Din (Arabic: مقام خادم صلاح الدين; Shrine of the Servant of Saladin).

The current structure of the Shrine of Joshua is known to be an Islamic shrine built by Sultan Saladin, which contained on its wall an inscribed plaque stating that "Jawhar ibn Abdullah is one of the servants of the shrine." About this man, Palestinian historian Murad Mustafa Dabbagh wrote in his work Biladuna Filastin (Our Country Palestine; 1965) that he performed the pilgrimage on behalf of his master, the martyr Najm al-Din Ayyub, son of Sultan Al-Adil I, and that the Hajj took place in the year 610 AH (1213/14 CE), which places him and the time the shrine was built during the Ayyubid period.

The shrine considered by Jews to be the tomb of Caleb is seen by Muslims to be the maqam of Prophet Dhu al-Kifl, from whom they consider the first part of the town's name to be derived.

The third holy structure in Kifl Haris, standing at some distance in the southwest of the town, is a large open shrine dedicated to Prophet Dhul-Nun, identified with Yunus (Jonah). Jews see in it the tomb of Nun, the father of Joshua.

Wafa Palestine News Agency reports that after the 1967 Six-Day War, the village shrines became a religious destination for Jews, with visits increasingly taking a political and Judaizing character.

Archaeologists from Bar-Ilan University began an excavation project at Khirbet Tibnah, believed to be where Joshua lived and was buried, in July 2022. The site is also known as Timnath-serah, which according to the biblical book bearing his name, was given by the Israelites to Joshua (Joshua 24:30) The tomb of Caleb is also believed to be at the site. Dror Raviv of Bar-Ilan University originally mapped the site in 2015, collecting fragments of pottery and documenting remains and burial caves that showed the existence of past Jewish settlement at the site.

== Bibliography ==
- Finkelstein, I.; Lederman, Zvi, eds. (1997). Highlands of many cultures. Tel Aviv: Institute of Archaeology of Tel Aviv University Publications Section. ISBN 965-440-007-3.
- Schürer, E. (1891). Geschichte des jüdischen Volkes im Zeitalter Jesu Christi [A History of the Jewish People in the Time of Jesus Christ]. Geschichte de jüdischen Volkes im Zeitalter Jesu Christi.English. Vol. 1. Translated by Miss Taylor. New York: Charles Scribner's Sons.
