= Sefer haYashar =

Sefer haYashar (Hebrew ספר הישר) means "Book of the Upright One", but Jashar is generally left untranslated into English and so Sefer haYashar is often rendered as Book of Jasher.

== Biblical ==
- Book of Jasher (biblical book)
- Book of Jasher (Pseudo-Jasher), an eighteenth-century forgery by a London printer, Jacob Ilive
- Book of Jashar, fictional translation of the supposed Book of Jasher mentioned in 2 Samuel by Benjamin Rosenbaum (born 1969)

== Rabbinical treatises ==
- Sefer haYashar, a collection of sayings of the sages from the Amoraim period in Rabbi Zerahiah's Sefer Hayasher
- Sefer haYashar, a commentary on the Pentateuch by the 12th-century Abraham ibn Ezra
- Sefer haYashar, by the Kabbalist and philosopher Abraham Abulafia
- Sefer haYashar (Rabbeinu Tam), 12th-century treatise on Jewish ritual and ethics
- Sefer haYashar of Zerahiah the Greek, a moral treatise of the 13th century
- Sefer haYashar (midrash), a 16th-century book of Jewish legends
