= Khirbet Tibnah =

Archaeological site in the West Bank

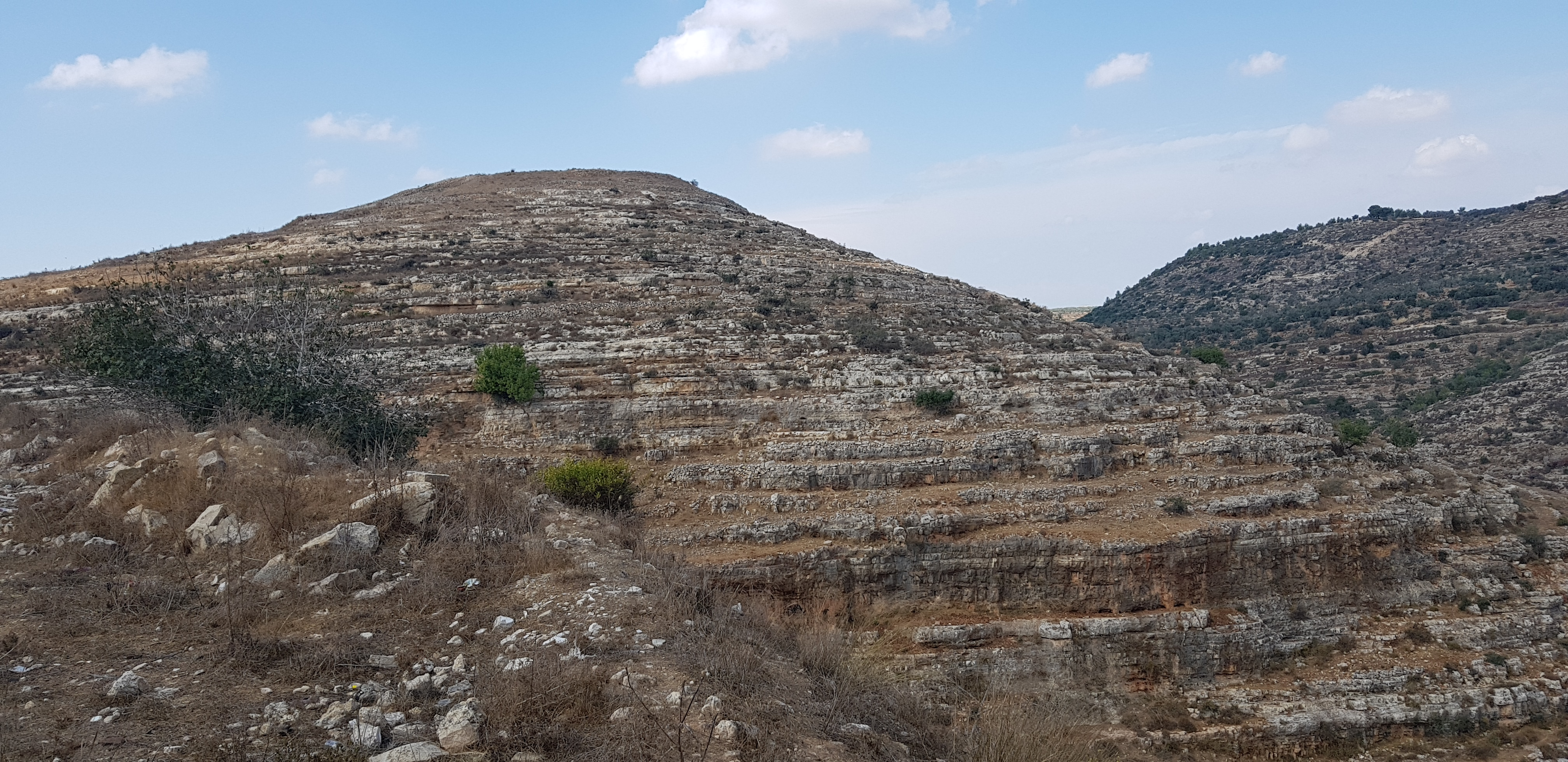
- Khirbet Tibnah viewed from the east in 2019

- Location within the West Bank
- 32°00′30″N 35°06′40″E
- Location: Ramallah and al-Bireh Governorate
- Region: West Bank (State of Palestine)
- Grid position: 16035/15725 PAL

Site notes
- Excavation dates: 20th century (poorly documented) and 2022
- Archaeologists: Yitzhak Magen; Dvir Raviv
- Condition: Ruin

Khirbet Tibnah (also Tibneh) is a tell (archaeological mound) located in the Ramallah and al-Bireh Governorate of the West Bank, between the villages Deir Nidham and Nabi Salih. It was inhabited from the Early Bronze Age to the Ottoman period.

Khirbet Tibnah is identified with the ancient town of Thamna. The site was excavated in the 20th century by Yitzhak Magen but the work is unpublished. Further investigations were carried out in the 2010s and 2020s.

== History ==
=== Bronze Age ===
The earliest inhabitation at Khirbet Tibnah dated to the Early Bronze Age, a period spanning approximately 3300–2000 BC.

=== Classical antiquity ===
Emil Schürer wrote in the 1880s that Thamna (Greek: Θαμνά) – a city within the district of Diospolis (Lydda) and which served once as a toparchy (administrative city) during the Roman period – is to be identified with the biblical city of Timnath-serah, now known as the ruin (khirba in Arabic) of Tibnah (Tibneh) in Samaria. According to Eusebius' Onomasticon, which was written in the 4th century, the tomb of Joshua was in his time still visited at a place near the village.

=== Roman and Byzantine periods ===
Thamna was the administrative center of a toparchy. In 66 CE, at the onset of the First Jewish–Roman War, the toparchy was placed under the command of John the Essene.

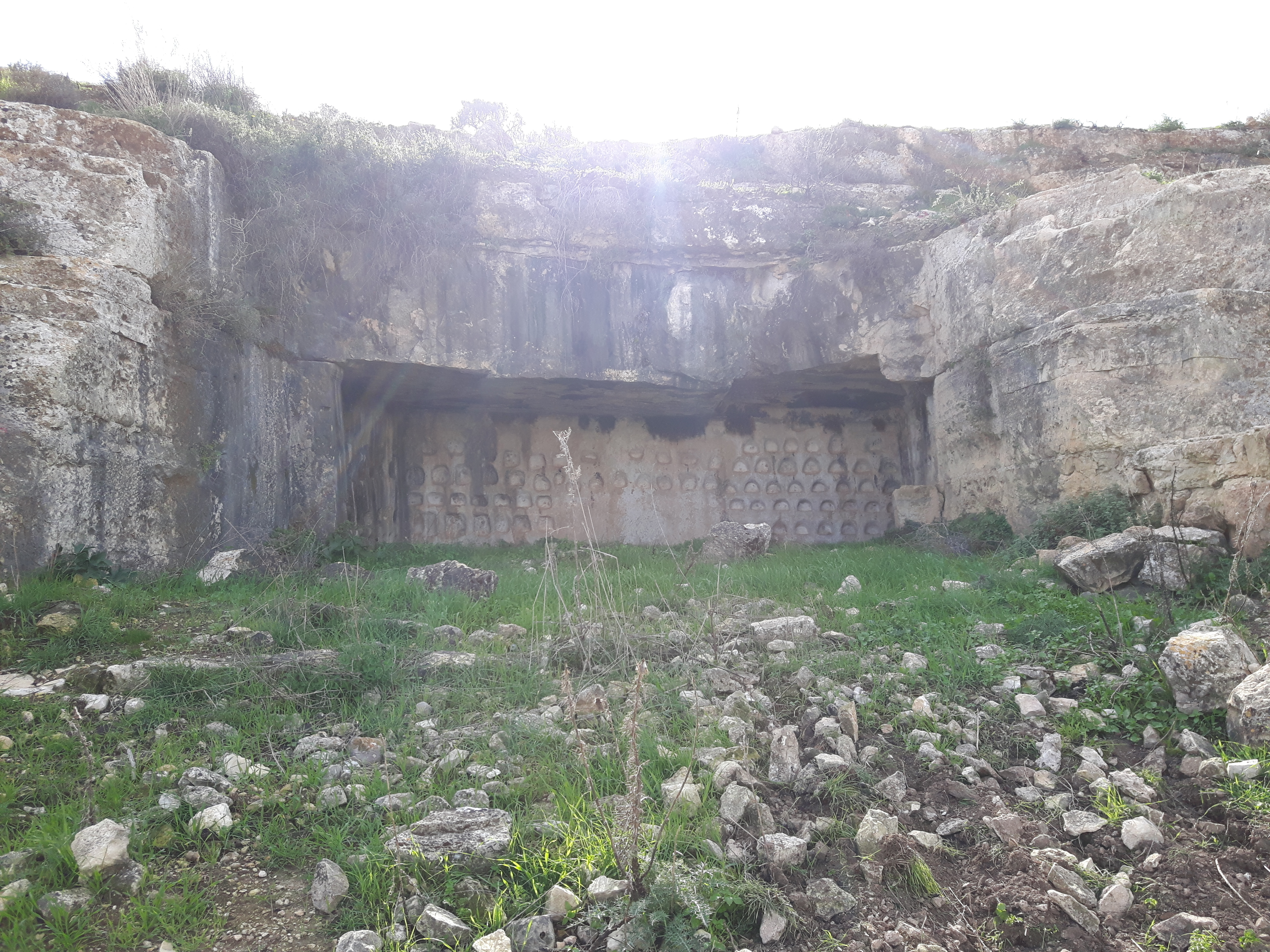
The tomb described by Victor Guérin as "Joshua's Tomb", though Claude Reignier Conder disagreed.

Ceramics from the Late Roman and the Byzantine periods have been found at Khirbet Tibnah.

On the north slope of the hill south of Khirbet Tibnah lies a Jewish necropolis. Based on comparison to similar sites and discoveries at the site, archaeologist Dvir Raviv suggests that it may have been established in the Hellenistic period and used until the Bar Kokhba revolt. The necropolis consists of 16 known graves, and there are an additional six in the surrounding area. The rock-cut tombs have kokhim (shafts for burials) that are typical to that period. In some of them were the remains of ossuaries. In the valley just below the necropolis there is an unusually large mikveh with two entrances.

=== Crusader period ===
Khirbet Tibnah is one of the places tentatively identified by Röhricht with the Crusader Tyberie.

=== Ottoman period ===
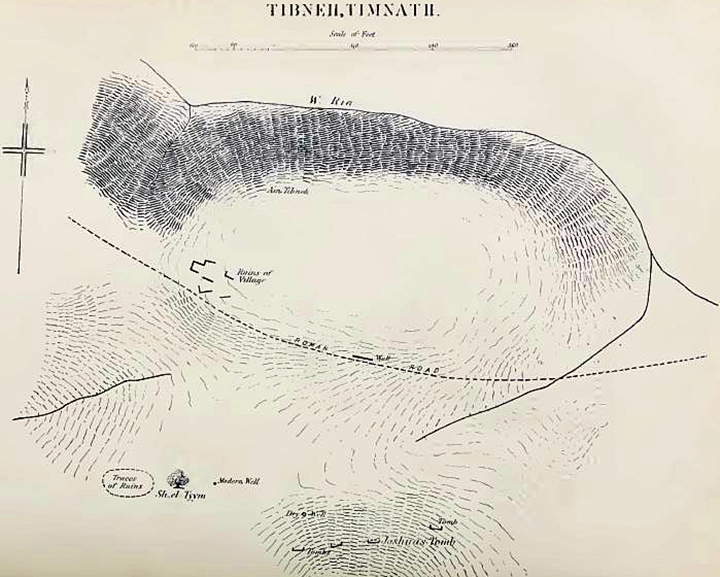
Survey of Tibneh by Claude Reignier Conder, published in 1882

In 1596, the Tibnah (Tibya) site was listed as village in the nahiya Quds, in the administrative district Liwā` of Jerusalem, in a tax ledger of the "countries of Syria" (wilāyat aš-Šām) and which lands were then under Ottoman rule. During that year, Tibna was inhabited by 20 family heads, all Muslim. The Ottoman authority levied a 33.3% taxation on agricultural products produced by the villagers (primarily on wheat, barley, and olives), besides a marriage tax and supplement tax on goats and beehives. Total revenues accruing from the village of Tibna for that year amounted to 3700 akçe.

Charles William Wilson, who travelled through Palestine in 1866, reported a cemetery containing nine tombs south of the town, which was once capital of the surrounding district: one of these tombs was large, with a portico supported on piers of rock with very simple capitals. One of the piers was apparently destroyed between 1866 and 1873. There were niches for over 200 lamps at the tomb entrance. Inside was a chamber with fourteen graves, or kokhim, with a passage leading into an inner chamber containing one grave. He also wrote about a 40 foot high oak tree near the tomb, known as Sheikh et-Teim, and a village about 3 miles to the east, called Kefr Ishu'a, or Joshua's Village.

Amateur archaeologist Victor Guérin visited in 1863 and in 1870 and described several ruins. Khirbet Tibnah is described in 1882 as a tell overlooking a deep valley (Wady Reiya) on the north and the ancient Roman road to the south. A cemetery was situated on a flat hill nearby, and to the northwest, the spring of Ein Tibnah emerged from a rocky channel. On the southwest was an oak tree some 30 or 40 feet high, and two wells, one of them dry. West of the tree were traces of ruins believed to be those of an Arab village.

=== Mandate period ===
The village was not inhabited in the late mandatory period.

== Investigation ==
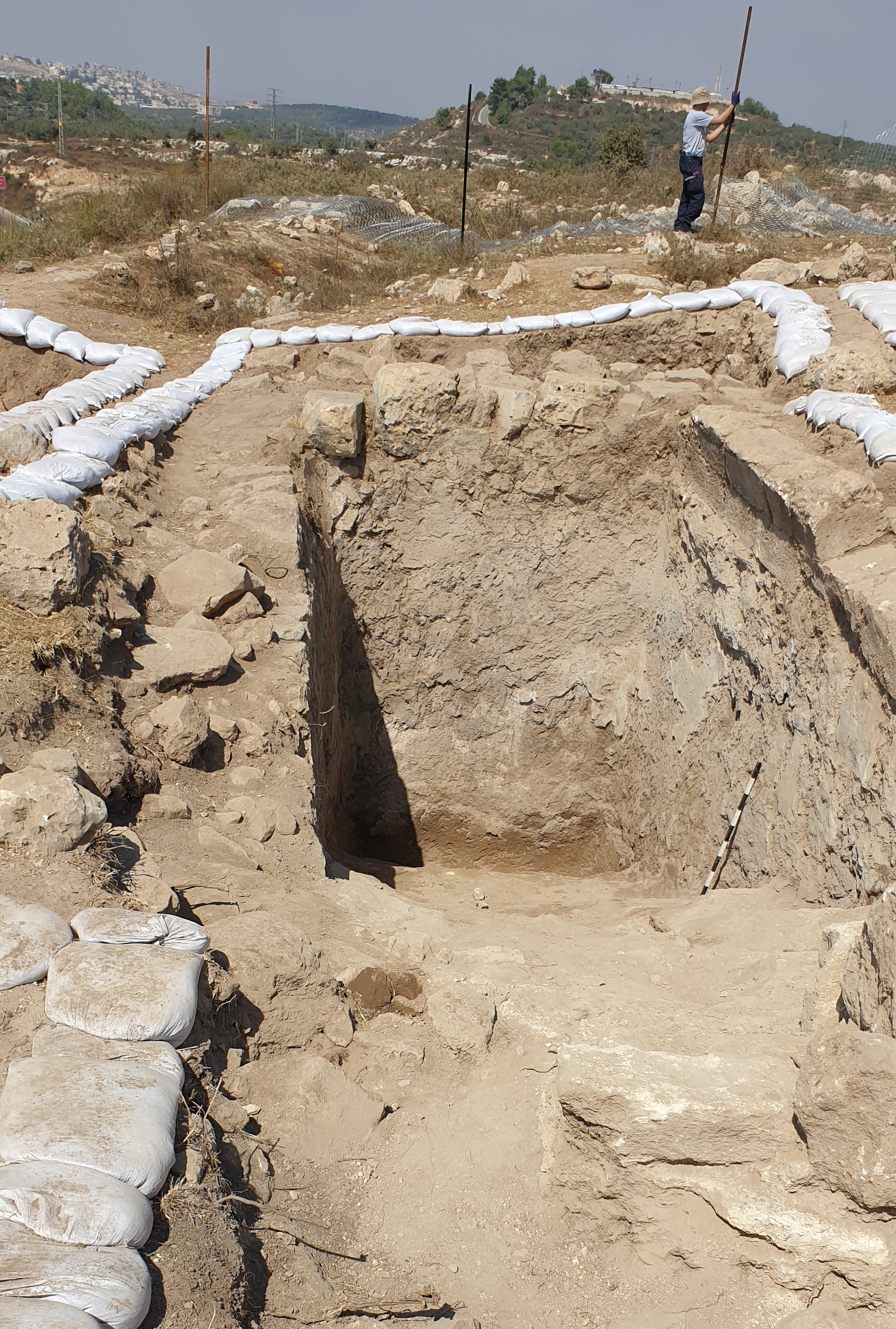
A mikveh (Jewish ritual bath) excavated by a team from Bar-Ilan University in 2022. Local Palestinians objected to the excavation on the basis that it was taking place on private land.

British officer Claude Reignier Conder surveyed Khirbet Tibnah on behalf of the Palestine Exploration Fund in 1873.

Following the Six-Day War in 1967, Israel occupied the West Bank and the Staff Officer for Archaeology (SOA) assumed control over archaeological sites. Yitzhak Magen (then SOA) excavated the site based on a license issued un 1977, but no data on the activities is publicly available.

Dvir Raviv from Bar-Ilan University mapped Khirbet Tibnah in 2015 and initiated an excavation at the site in 2022. The local Palestinian populace objected on the basis that the project was taking place on privately owned land and sought legal help and the support of anti-occupation activist Bassem Tamimi. Bar-Ilan University, who provided archaeologists for the dig, contended that it was state-owned land. Israeli-led excavations in the West Bank are rare as they break international law preventing occupiers carrying out excavations.

== See also ==
- Khirbet et-Tibbaneh aka Timnah of Judah, site in the Judaean Mountains
- Kifl Haris, another place with a Tomb of Joshua

== Bibliography ==
- Conder, C.R. (1878). "Joshua's Tomb". Palestine Exploration Quarterly. 10 (1): 22–23. doi:10.1179/peq.1878.10.1.22. ISSN 0031-0328.
- Conder, C.R.; Kitchener, H. H. (1882). The Survey of Western Palestine: Memoirs of the Topography, Orography, Hydrography, and Archaeology. Vol. 2. London: Committee of the Palestine Exploration Fund.
- Dauphin, C. (1998). La Palestine byzantine, Peuplement et Populations. BAR International Series 726 (in French). Vol. III : Catalogue. Oxford: Archeopress. ISBN 0-860549-05-4.
- Finkelstein, I.; Lederman, Zvi, eds. (1997). Highlands of many cultures. Tel Aviv: Institute of Archaeology of Tel Aviv University Publications Section. ISBN 965-440-007-3. (p. 367)
- Greenberg, Raphael; Keinan, Adi (2009). Israeli Archaeological Activity in the West Bank 1967–2007: A Sourcebook (PDF). Ostracon. ISBN 978-965-91468-0-2.
- Guérin, V. (1875). Description Géographique Historique et Archéologique de la Palestine (in French). Vol. 2: Samarie, pt. 2. Paris: L'Imprimerie Nationale.
- Hütteroth, W.-D.; Abdulfattah, K. (1977). Historical Geography of Palestine, Transjordan and Southern Syria in the Late 16th Century. Erlanger Geographische Arbeiten, Sonderband 5. Erlangen, Germany: Vorstand der Fränkischen Geographischen Gesellschaft. ISBN 3-920405-41-2.
- Jerusalem Post Staff (28 July 2022). "First archaeological dig begins at site believed to be Joshua's tomb". The Jerusalem Post.
- Palmer, E.H. (1881). The Survey of Western Palestine: Arabic and English Name Lists Collected During the Survey by Lieutenants Conder and Kitchener, R. E. Transliterated and Explained by E.H. Palmer. Committee of the Palestine Exploration Fund.
- Raviv, Dvir (2017). "שרידים מתקופת בית שני עד מרד בר כוכבא בתל תמנה שבדרום השומרון" (PDF). במעבה ההר. 7 (7): 13–51 – via כתב עת לארכיאולוגיה והיסטוריה של אזור ההר.
- Rogers, Guy MacLean (2021). For the Freedom of Zion: the Great Revolt of Jews against Romans, 66-74 CE. New Haven: Yale University Press. ISBN 978-0-300-24813-5.
- Röhricht, R. (1887). "Studien zur mittelalterlichen Geographie und Topographie Syriens" [Studies on the medieval geography and topography of Syria]. Zeitschrift des Deutschen Palästina-Vereins. 10: 195–344.
- Schürer, E. (1891). Geschichte des jüdischen Volkes im Zeitalter Jesu Christi [A History of the Jewish People in the Time of Jesus Christ]. Vol. 1 of the 2nd division. Translated by Sophia Taylor; Rev. Peter Christie (2nd revised edition of "Manual of the History of New Testament Times" ed.). New York: Charles Scribner's Sons. p. 158 (note 438) – via HathiTrust website. Cf. Flavius Josephus, The Wars of the Jews 3:51 at perseus.tufts.edu.
- Shezaf, Hagar; Hasson, Nir (10 August 2022). "Israeli University Holds Archaeological Dig in West Bank Area Claimed to Be Palestinian". Haaretz.
- Silberman, Neil Asher (2003), "Power, politics and the past: the social construction of antiquity in the Holy Land", in Levy, Thomas E. (ed.), The Archaeology of Society in the Holy Land (2n; reprint ed.), London and New York: Continuum, pp. 9–23, ISBN 0-8264-6996-5
