= Maqam Nabi Yusha' =

Maqam in As-Salt, Jordan

- مقام النبي يوشع
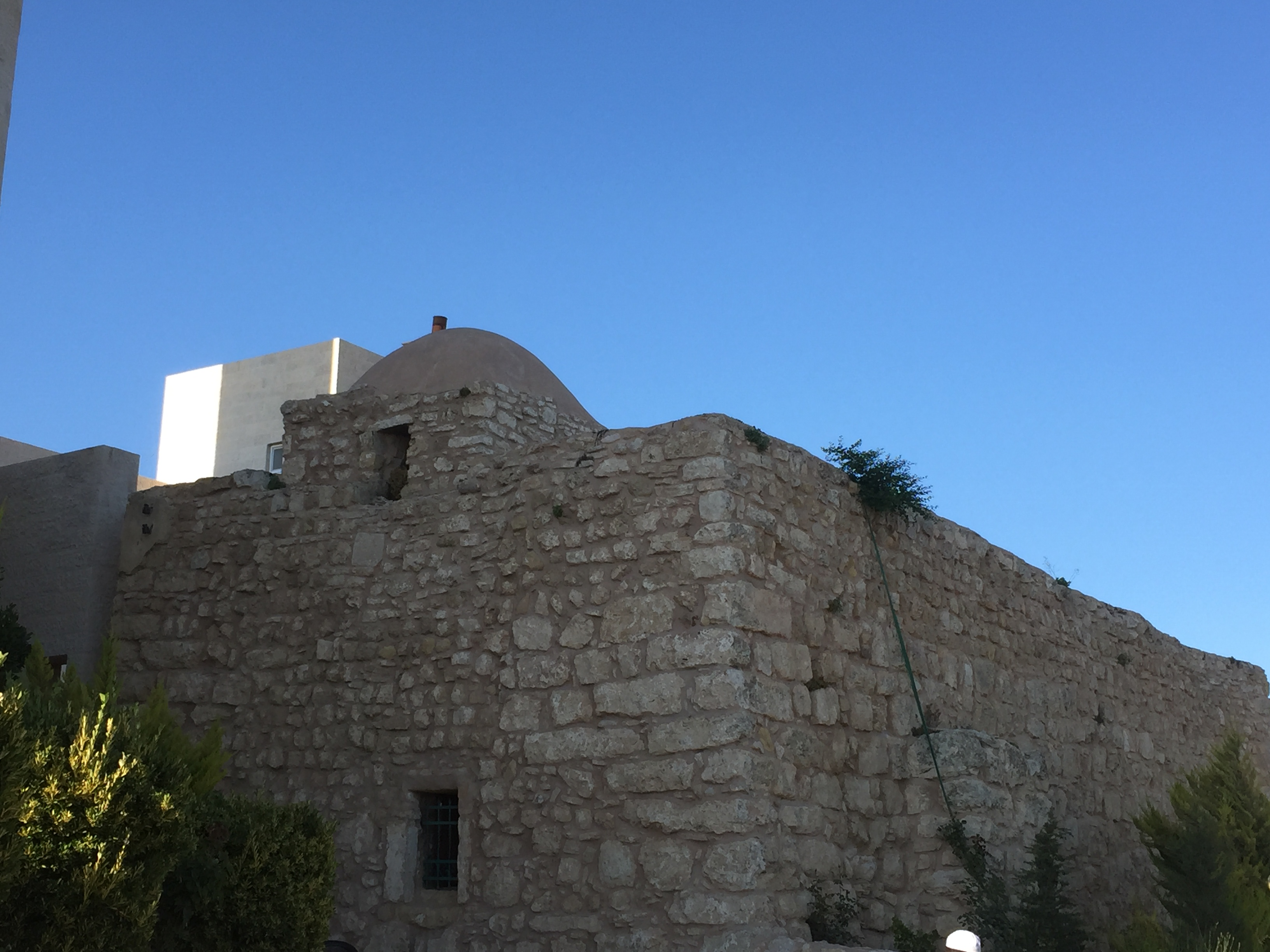
- The mausoleum in 2015

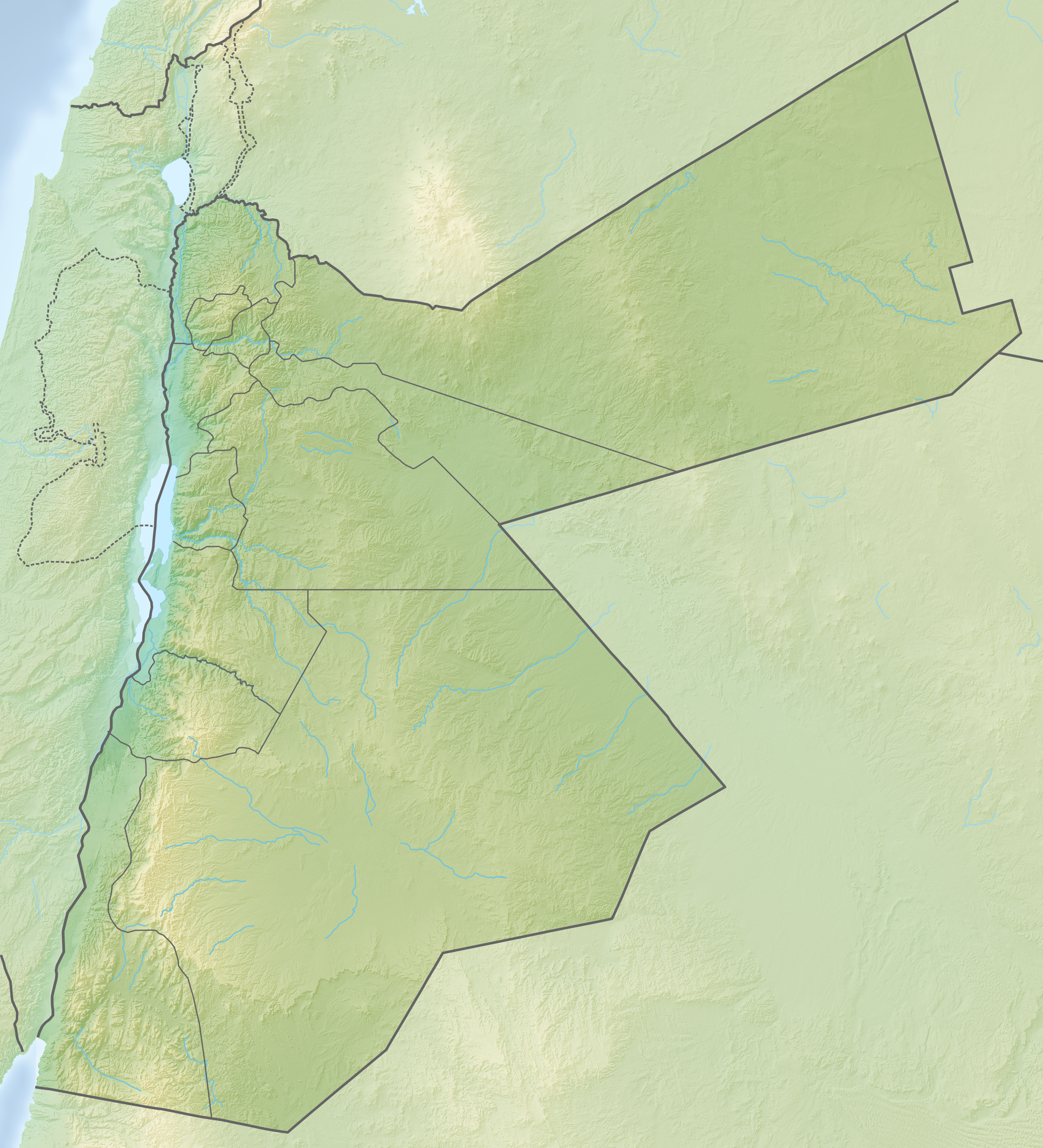
- Location of the complex in Jordan

Religion
- Affiliation: Islam
- Ecclesiastical or organizational status: Mausoleum; Mosque
- Status: Active

Location
- Location: As-Salt, Balqa Governorate
- Country: Jordan
- Interactive map of Maqam Nabi Yusha'
- Coordinates: 32°04′17″N 35°42′32″E

Architecture
- Style: Ottoman; Modern Jordani
- Founder: Emir Mahdawi (mausoleum); King Abdullah II (mosque)
- Completed: 16th century (mausoleum); 2004 (mosque)
- Construction cost: 580,000 dinars

Specifications
- Interior area: 1,400 m^{2} (15,000 sq ft)
- Dome: 1
- Minaret: 1
- Minaret height: 27 m (89 ft)
- Shrine: 1

The Maqam Nabi Yusha' (Arabic: مقام النبي يوشع) is a mausoleum and mosque complex located in the city of As-Salt, in the governorate of Balqa, Jordan. The 16th-century mausoleum purportedly contains the tomb of the biblical Joshua. The mosque was completed in 2004.

== History ==
The mausoleum dedicated to Joshua was built during the Mamluk period by the governor, Emir Mahdawi. The mausoleum was then rebuilt in the 16th century, during the early years of Ottoman rule. Then, during the rule of King Abdullah II, a new mosque and building with facilities was attached to the mausoleum and mausoleum was also renovated; completed in 2004, and the new mosque complex was opened in the same year.

== General specifications ==
The complex comprises the mausoleum, mosque, as well as facilities for civilians, such as a multi-purpose hall, a library, a cafeteria, a residence for the mosque's imam and a residence for the muezzin. The total interior area of the mosque is 1,400 square metres (15,000 sq ft). A cemetery exists outside the wall of the mausoleum, where devotees and their families are buried.

== Architecture ==
=== Mausoleum ===
The purported mausoleum of Joshua is the oldest part of the religious complex, dating to the 16th-century with foundation from the Mamluk period. Inside, the cenotaph placed over Joshua's alleged grave is more than 6 metres (20 ft) long, and covered by a green cloth. The mausoleum is a holy and spiritual site for the residents of As-Salt.

=== Mosque ===
The mosque attached to the mausoleum was completed in 2004 and opened in the same year. It is a relatively modern structure. The mosque's minaret is 27 metres (89 ft) high. Prayer halls in the mosque are gender segregated.

== Gallery ==
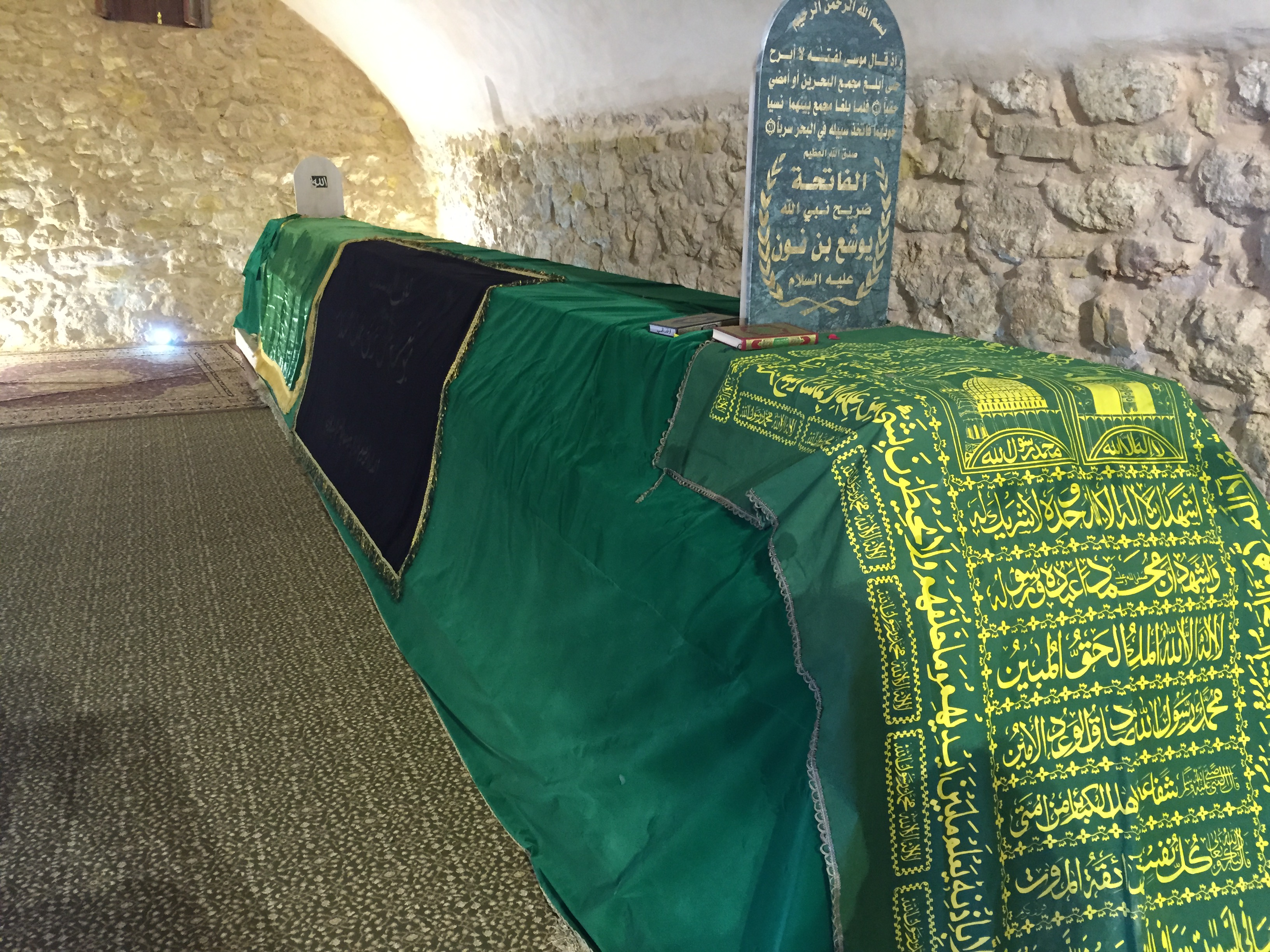
The 6-metre-long (20 ft) cenotaph placed above the purported grave of Joshua

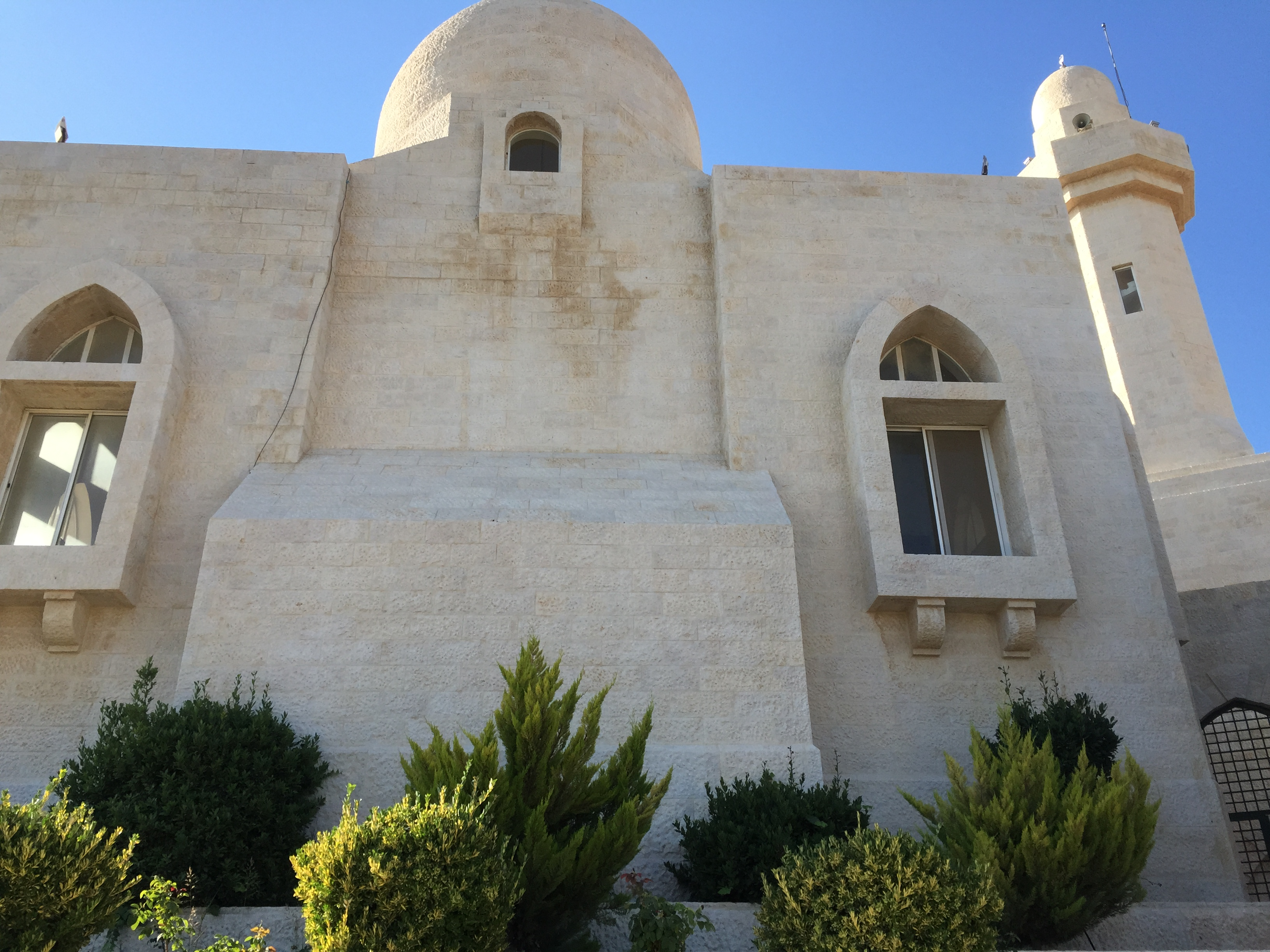
Exterior facade of the modern mosque building

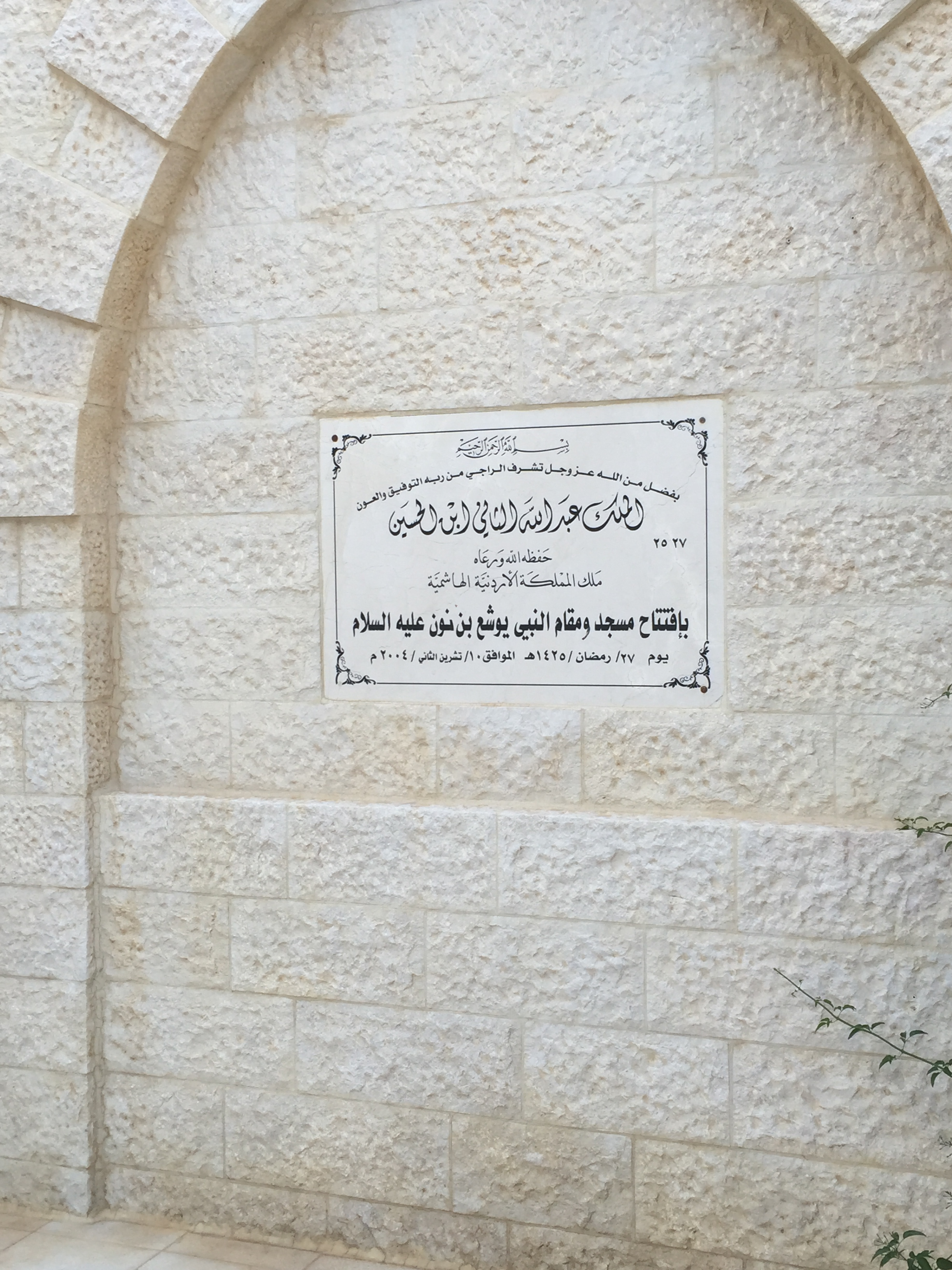
A plaque which indicated the opening of the modern building in 2004

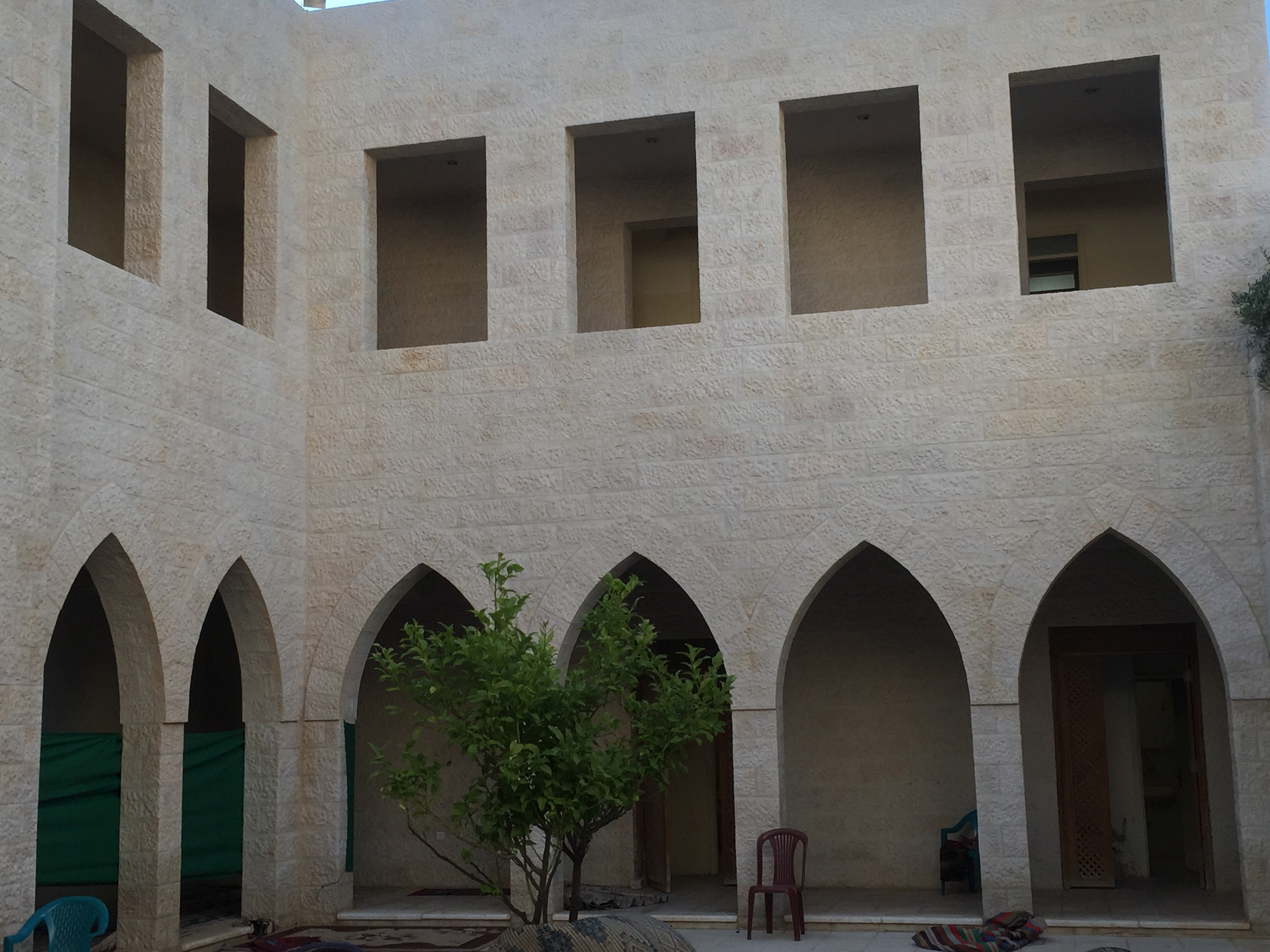
Inside the courtyard of the modern structure

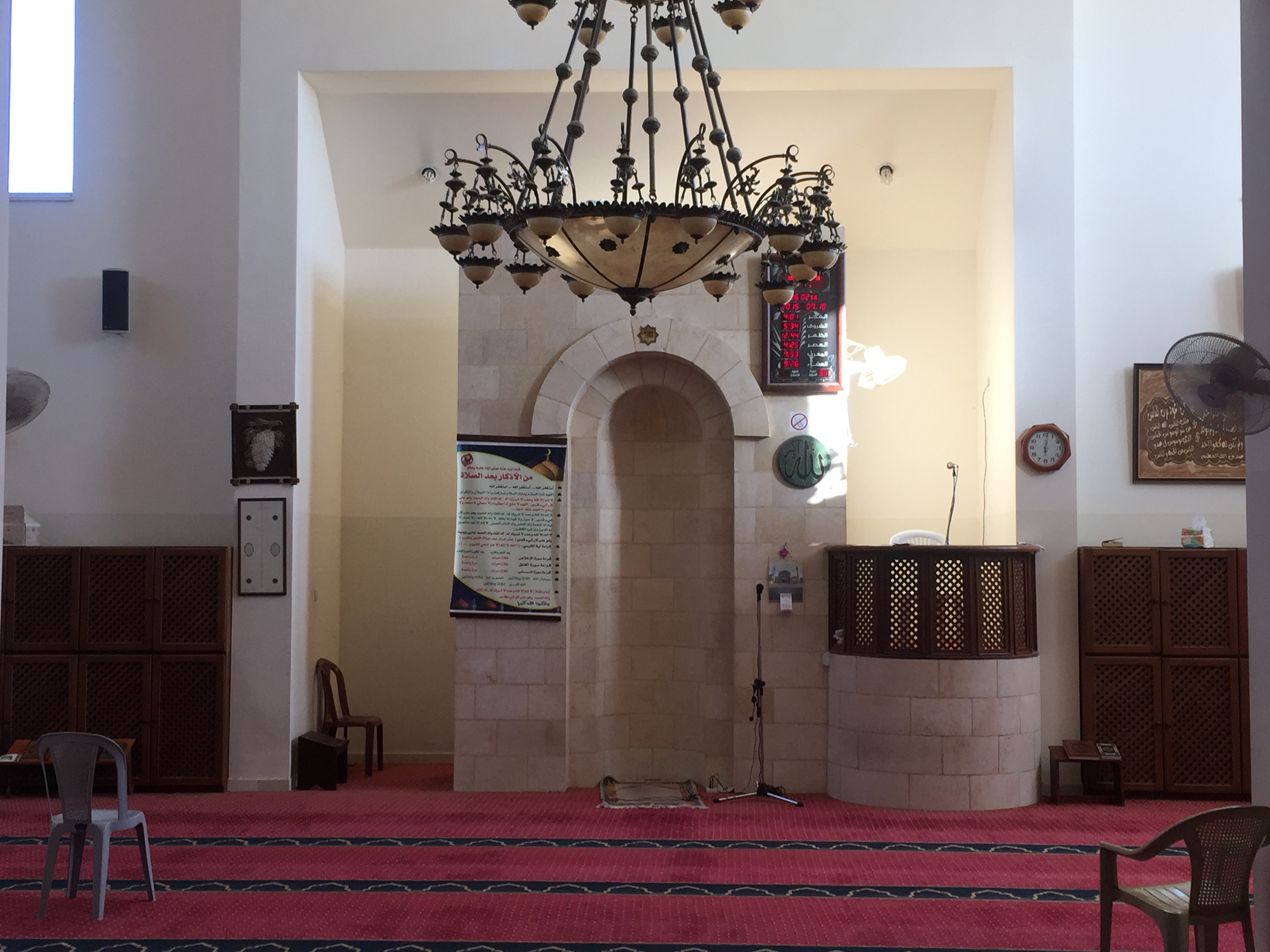
The prayer hall of the modern mosque, with mihrab and minbar visible

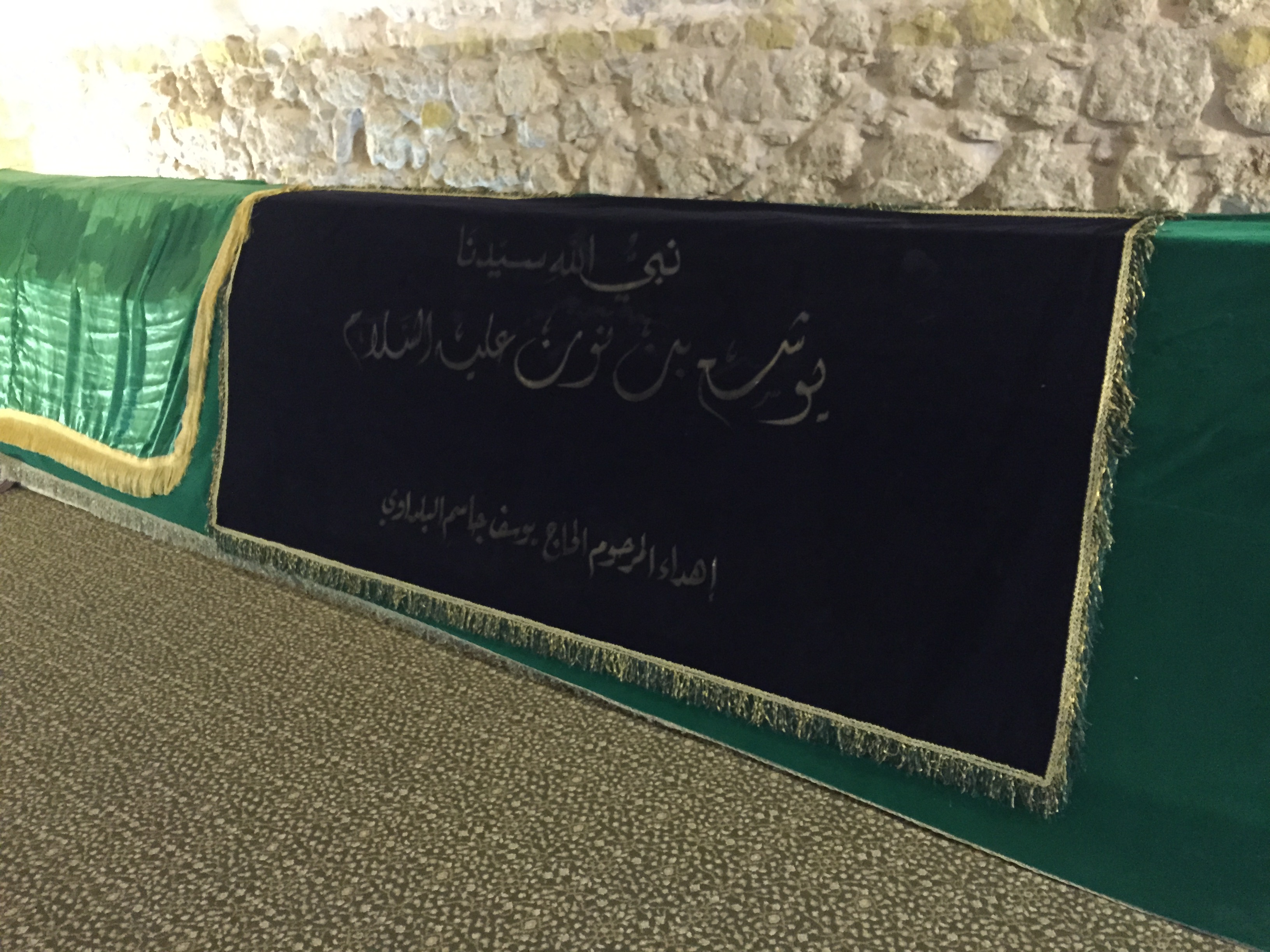
A view of Joshua's purported grave

== See also ==
- Islam in Jordan
- List of mosques in Jordan
- Tomb of Joshua, another mausoleum attributed to Joshua in Palestine
- List of burial places of Abrahamic figures
