= Johann Georg Abicht =

German theologian (1672–1740)

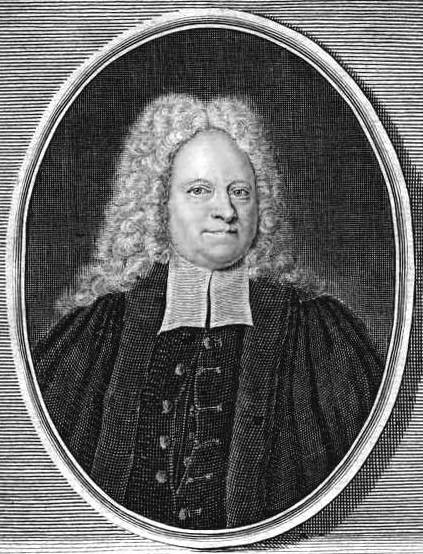
- Born: 21 March 1672; Königsee, Schwarzburg-Sondershausen, Germany
- Died: June 5, 1740 (aged 68)
- Education: University of Jena and University of Leipzig
- Occupation(s): Theologian and Lutheran Clergyman
- Movement: Lutheranism

Johann Georg Abicht (21 March 1672 – 5 June 1740) was a German Lutheran theologian, born at Königsee, Schwarzburg-Sondershausen.

After finishing his studies at the universities of Jena and Leipzig, Abicht became teacher of oriental languages at the latter in 1702. In 1707 he was appointed rector of the college of Danzig and pastor at the Holy Trinity Church. In 1729 he was appointed general superintendent, professor of theology and pastor at the town church of Wittenberg.

His best-known works are those about oriental languages and Hebrew archaeology.

== Publications ==
- Methodus linguae sanctae, Leipzig, 1718
- Dissertatio de Libro recti, Leipzig 1732 - a Latin translation of the Hebrew midrash "Book of Jasher" (Venice 1625)

== Sources ==
- Allgemeine Deutsche Biographie - online version at Wikisource
