= Timnath-heres =

Biblical location

Kifl Haris, West Bank
- Location within the West Bank
- 32.119519°N 35.157183°E
- Location: West Bank
- Region: Salfit Governorate

Khirbet Tibnah, West Bank
- Location within the West Bank
- 32°00′30″N 35°06′40″E
- Grid position: 16035/15725 PAL

Timnath-heres or Timnath-serah (Hebrew: תמנת חרס), later Thamna, was the town given by the Israelites to Joshua according to the Hebrew Bible. He requested it and the people gave it to him "at the order of the Lord". He built up the town and lived in it (Joshua 19:49–50).

According to the Septuagint version of the Book of Joshua, Joshua placed there "the stone knives, with which he had circumcised the children of Israel".

According to the Bible, Joshua was buried there (Joshua 24:30). Jewish tradition also places the tomb of Caleb there.

In 2022, excavations by Israeli archaeologists were launched at Khirbet Tibnah in the West Bank, a hilltop site commonly identified as biblical Timnath.

== Etymology ==
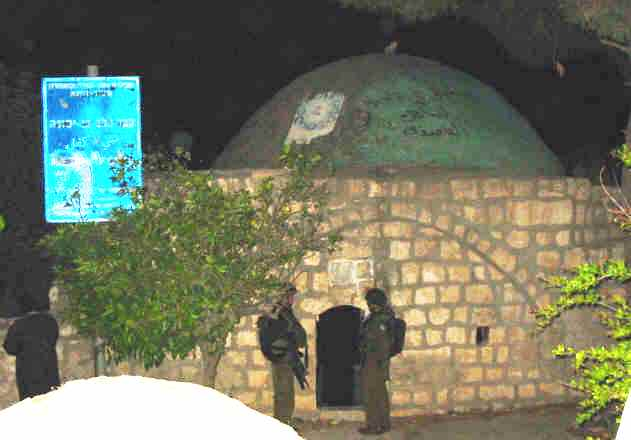
Mark of grave attributed to Caleb, in Kifl Hares

In Joshua 19:49–50 and Joshua 24:30, the town is called Timnath-serah, whereas in Judges 2:9 it is named as Timnath-heres.

In the Talmud the town is mentioned in Bava Batra 122b, where "heres" is translated as "earthenware," in reference to fruits in the area being as dry as earthenware prior to the arrival of Joshua. The word's inversion, "serah" is defined as "rotting," that after Joshua's arrival, the fruits became so juicy that they could quickly rot.

== Location ==
The town was located in the mountainous region of Ephraim, north of Mount Gaash. It has been variously identified with two possible locations, Kifl Hares and Khirbet Tibnah.

Both E. Schürer and archaeologist W. F. Albright identified Timnath-heres with Thamna, mentioned in Greco-Roman sources including the writings of Josephus. Eusebius, in his Onomasticon, mentions the site under the entry of Gaas (Mount Gaash), a mountain in Ephraim (Josh. 24:33), "near the village of Thamna."

Conder & Kitchener of the Palestine Exploration Fund, steering clear of committing themselves to pinpointing the position of the biblical Timnath-heres in either Kifl Haris or Khirbet Tibnah, mention only the classical references to the place Thamnatha / Thamna (as in Pliny, Hist. Nat. v. 14 and in The Jewish War 3.3.5), saying that this place is to be identified with the present ruin Tibneh (marked on sheet xiv), and that "some have identified it with Timnath-heres."

During the first-century CE until its destruction, Thamna served as an administrative district (toparchy).

=== Kifl Hares ===
One possible location Timnath-heres has been identified with is the Palestinian village of Kifl Hares, located 6 kilometres west of Salfit in the West Bank.

=== Khirbet Tibnah ===
Another candidate is Khirbet Tibnah, located between Deir Nidham and Nabi Salih, east of the Israeli town of Shoham and near the settlement of Halamish. Various surveys have produced proof of habitation from the Bronze Age until the early Ottoman period, with various findings from the Iron Age and the Hasmonean, Roman, and Mamluk periods. The dig is led by Dvir Raviv, an archeologist who mapped the site in 2015. He made sketches of the location of tombs, assembled pottery shards and documented burial caves. The current excavation has unearthed a spear tip dated to the second century C.E. as well as pottery and coins. Under international law an occupying power is not permitted to carry out archaeological excavations except to preserve or rescue a site.

== Bibliography ==
- Albright, W.F. (1923). "Some Archaeological and Topographical Results of a Trip through Palestine". Bulletin of the American Schools of Oriental Research. 11 (11). The University of Chicago Press on behalf of The American Schools of Oriental Research: 3–14. doi:10.2307/1354763. JSTOR 1354763. S2CID 163409706.
- Chapmann III, R.L.; Taylor, J.E., eds. (2003). Palestine in the Fourth Century A.D.: The Onomasticon by Eusebius of Caesarea. Translated by G.S.P. Freeman-Grenville. Jerusalem: Carta. ISBN 965-220-500-1. OCLC 937002750.
- Conder, C.R.; Kitchener, H. H. (1882). The Survey of Western Palestine: Memoirs of the Topography, Orography, Hydrography, and Archaeology (Samaria). Vol. 2. London: Committee of the Palestine Exploration Fund.
- Finkelstein, I.; Lederman, Zvi, eds. (1997). Highlands of many cultures. Tel Aviv: Institute of Archaeology of Tel Aviv University Publications Section. ISBN 965-440-007-3.
- Schürer, E. (1891). Geschichte des jüdischen Volkes im Zeitalter Jesu Christi [A History of the Jewish People in the Time of Jesus Christ]. Geschichte de jüdischen Volkes im Zeitalter Jesu Christi.English. Vol. 1. Translated by Miss Taylor. New York: Charles Scribner's Sons.
