= Zerahiah the Greek =

Jewish philosopher in the Byzantine Empire

Rabbi Zerachiah the Greek (in Hebrew, Zerachiah ha-Yavani or ha-Yewani; sometimes known by the acronymistic nickname "Ra'Za'H") was a Greek-Jewish ethicist who resided in the Byzantine Empire in the thirteenth or fourteenth century. Of his life no details are known, except that he was the author of an ethical work entitled Sefer ha-Yashar (not to be confused with the many other Jewish writings of the same name); this work was confused with Jacob Tam's halakhic work of the same name and erroneously attributed to the renowned tosafist. This error was detected by Menahem Lonzano, who, in his poem "Derek Ḥayyim" ("Shete Yadot," p. 122), expressly states that the ethical work in question belonged to Zerahiah. Lonzano did not succeed, however, in correctly establishing the identity of its author, for a second error immediately arose. Since Zerahiah ha-Yewani had the same initials as Zerachiah Ha-Levi Gerondi, the author of the well-known Sefer ha-Ma'or, the Sefer ha-Yashar was attributed by some bibliographers to the latter.

The Sefer ha-Yashar is divided into eighteen short chapters, and treats the ethical principles which underlie the relation of man to God. It is an imitation of Bahya ibn Paquda's Hobot ha-Lebabot, which Zerahiah acknowledges in his preface that he had studied, although he found it too long and too profound for the average reader. The indebtedness of the Sefer ha-Yashar to the "Hobot ha-Lebabot" is especially evident in the first chapter, entitled Sod Beri'at 'Olam, which is simply a brief summary of the chapters called Sha'ar ha-Yihud and Sha'ar ha-Behinah in Bahya's work. The Sefer ha-Yashar was first published at Constantinople in 1526, and since then has passed through twenty-four editions.
