= Sefer haYashar (midrash) =

Medieval Hebrew midrash

Sefer haYashar (ספר הישר) is a medieval Hebrew midrash, also known as the Toledot Adam and Divrei haYamim heArukh. The Hebrew title "Sefer haYashar" might be translated as the "Book of Righteousness" (or literally "Book of the Straight") but it is known in English translation mostly as The Book of Jasher following English tradition. Its author is unknown.

== Other books of the same name ==
The book is named after the Book of Jasher mentioned in Joshua and 2 Samuel.

Although it is presented as the original "Book of Jasher" in translations such as that of Moses Samuel (1840), it is not accepted as such in rabbinical Judaism. It should not be confused with the very different Book of Jasher (Pseudo-Jasher) printed by Jacob Ilive in 1751, which was purported to have been translated by the English monk Alcuin.

Additionally, an ethical text was written under the same name (not purporting to be the biblical book). According to the Encyclopaedia Judaica, Volume 14, p. 1099, this work was "probably written in the 13th century."

Rabbeinu Tam also titled his work of Talmudic novellae Sefer Hayashar.

== Content ==
The book covers biblical history from the creation of Adam and Eve until a summary of the initial Israelite conquest of Canaan in the beginning of the book of Judges.

The Bible quotes a book of Jasher twice; once in Joshua 10:13 which can be found in Sefer haYashar 88:63-64, and in 2 Samuel 1:17-27 where David sings a song of lament called use of the bow however no parts of this song can be found in Sefer haYashar.

But the book as a whole was written much later, as shown by chapter 10, which covers the descendants of Noah, but uses medieval names for territories and countries, most obviously Franza for France and Lumbardi in Italia for Lombardy. The text of this chapter closely follows the beginning of Josippon, a tenth-century rabbinic text that lists the various peoples living in Europe in c. 950.

Most of its extra-Biblical accounts are found in nearly the same form in other medieval compilations, or in the Talmud, other midrash or Arabic sources. For example, it includes the common tale that Lamech and his son accidentally killed Cain, thus requiting Cain's wickedness for slaying Abel.

There are five discrepancies when comparing it with chapter 5 of Genesis: When the Sefer relates that a son of Seth died "in the eighty-fourth year of the life of Noah," it calls that son Enoch instead of Enosh. Enoch actually was Jared's son. Other than the confusion of the names, the date agrees with Genesis. The Sefer also relates that Jared died in the "336th year of the life of Noah" (instead of the 366th year, as in Genesis) and that Lamech died in the "195th year of the life of Noah (instead of the 595th year). It also gives different lifespans for Lamech (770 instead of 777) and Methuselah (960 instead of 969).

In its genealogy of Abram (7:19), it makes no mention of the Cainan between Arpachshad and Selah, in congruence with the Masoretic Text and the Samaritan Pentateuch, but in conflict with the Septuagint and with the genealogy of Jesus in Luke 3.

In its highly interpolated account of God's testing of Abraham concerning Isaac, it says in 23:50-51: "And when they were going along Isaac said to his father: Behold, I see here the fire and wood, and where then is the lamb that is to be the burnt offering before the Lord? And Abraham answered his son Isaac, saying: The Lord has made choice of thee my son, to be a perfect burnt offering instead of the lamb." This conflicts with the biblical account, in which Abraham's response was only: "My son, God will provide himself a lamb for a burnt offering."

The book, when recounting episodes from the pericope Shemot, contains anecdotal material about Moses when he fled from Pharaoh after killing the Egyptian, and who is said to have fled to the land of Kush at the age of eighteen, where he was made the king of Kush at the age of twenty-seven, and there reigned for forty years before being deposed at the age of sixty-seven. According to this narrative, which is also alluded to in Josephus' Antiquities (2.10.1–2), Moses assisted the indigenous peoples of the country in their conquest of one of the rebellious cities (whose proprietor was Bilʻam the sorcerer) and which had been under siege for nine years. The narrative recounts how that when the enemy's country was infested with poisonous serpents, Moses contrived a stratagem how they could advance on the besieged city and take it without suffering harm from the vipers, by bringing along with them caged birds who fed upon snakes, and releasing the hungry birds in the enemy's territory. At this advice, they were able to take the city and they made Moses their king, and gave to him in marriage the deceased king's wife, whose name was Adoniya (the widow of Qiqanos).

== History ==
Scholars have proposed various dates between the 9th and 16th century for its composition.

The earliest extant version of this Hebrew midrash was printed in Venice in 1625, and the introduction refers to an earlier 1552 edition in Naples, of which neither trace nor other mention has been found. The printer Yosèf ben Samuel claimed the work was copied by a scribe named Jacob the son of Atyah, from an ancient manuscript whose letters could hardly be made out.

The Venice 1625 text was heavily criticised as a forgery by Leon Modena, as part of his criticisms of the Zohar as a forgery, and of Kabbalah in general. Modena was a member of the Venetian rabbinate that supervised the Hebrew press in Venice, and Modena prevented the printers from identifying Sefer ha-Yashar with the Biblical lost book.

Behold, it [the Zohar] is like Sefer ha-Yashar, which they printed (without my knowledge and without the knowledge of the sages here in Venice, about twenty years ago). Although I removed the fantasies and falsehoods from it, [e.g.,] that it is the Sefer ha-Yashar mentioned in Scripture, there are still those who claim that it was discovered during the time of the destruction [of the temple]. But who can stop those who imagine in their minds whatever they wish.

— Leon Modena, Ari Nohem, before 1648

Despite Modena's intervention, the preface to the 1625 version still claims that its original source book came from the ruins of Jerusalem in 70 CE, where a Roman officer named Sidrus allegedly discovered a Hebrew scholar hiding in a hidden library. The officer Sidrus reportedly took the scholar and all the books safely back to his estates in Seville, Spain (in Roman known as Hispalis, the provincial capital of Hispania Baetica). The 1625 edition then claims that at some uncertain point in the history of Islamic Spain, the manuscript was transferred or sold to the Jewish college in Cordova. The 1625 edition further claims that scholars preserved the book until its printings in Naples in 1552 and in Venice in 1625. Apart from the preface to the 1625 work, there is no evidence to support any of this story. The work was used extensively, but not especially more than many other sources, in Louis Ginzberg's Legends of the Jews.

Although there remains doubt about whether the 1552 "edition" in Naples was ever truly printed, the study of Joseph Dan, professor of Kabbalah at the Hebrew University of Jerusalem, in the preface to his 1986 critical edition of the 1625 text concludes, from the Hebrew used and other indicators, that the work was in fact written in Naples in the early 16th century. The Arabic connections suggest that if the preface to the 1625 version is an "exaggeration", it was then probably written by a Jew who lived in Spain or southern Italy.

== Translations ==
=== Johann Abicht's Latin translation ===
Johann Georg Abicht, professor of theology at the University of Halle-Wittenberg, translated the 1625 text into Latin as Dissertatio de Libro recti (Leipzig, 1732).

=== Moses Samuel's English translation ===
The first translation into English of the 1625 Venice edition was published in 1840 by Mordecai Manuel Noah and A. S. Gould. The translator was not named but was lauded by one of the four Hebraists who commented in the preface.

To Mssrs Noah and Gould. Gentlemen – I am acquainted with the 'Book of Jasher,' having read a considerable part of it while in the hands of the translator in England. The Hebrew is very purely written, and the translator is an eminent scholar.

— Rabbi H. V. Nathan, Kingston Synagogue, Jamaica, April 14, 1840

Subsequently, the translator identified himself as Moses Samuel of Liverpool (1795–1860), who had obtained a copy of the 1625 Hebrew edition and become convinced that the core of this work truly was the self-same Book of the Upright referenced in Hebrew scriptures. He translated the document into English and, after the Royal Asiatic Society at Calcutta declined to publish it, sold the translation to New York City publisher Noah for £150 in 1839. Samuel later said of the absence of his name on the translation that "I did not put my name to it as my Patron and myself differed about its authenticity" – Noah having had less confidence in the 1625 document than did Samuel.

Even so, Noah enthusiastically claimed in his promotional materials that the historian Josephus had said of the Book of Jasher "by this book are to be understood certain records kept in some safe place on purpose, giving an account of what happened among the Hebrews from year to year, and called Jasher or the upright, on account of the fidelity of the annals." No such statement is found in Josephus's works. Noah's 1840 preface contained endorsements by Hebrew scholars of the day, all of whom praised the quality of the translation, but these said nothing to indicate they believed it to be the work referred to in Joshua and 2 Samuel. In fact one of them, Samuel H. Turner (1790–1861), of the General Theological Seminary in New York City, commented that "The work itself is evidently composed in the purest Rabbinical Hebrew, with a large intermixture of the Biblical idiom", indicating he was not of the opinion that it was an ancient text.

=== Edward B.M. Browne English translation ===
Another translation of this book exists, created by Reform rabbi and editor, Dr. Edward B.M. Browne, known as "Alphabet" Browne, and published in New York in 1876.

== Acceptance by Latter-day Saints ==
Joseph Smith, founder of The Church of Jesus Christ of Latter-day Saints, acquired a copy in 1841 or 1842 and wrote in the September 1, 1842 edition of the Times and Seasons, in reference to the patriarch Abraham: "the book of Jasher, which has not been disproved as a bad author, says he was cast into the fire of the Chaldeans". David Whitmer of the Three Witnesses, arguing in favour of accepting scripture outside of the Biblical canon, later wrote in his 1887 Whitmerite tract An Address to All Believers in Christ, "There are over fifteen books spoken of in the Bible that are not in the Bible. [...] I have a copy of the book of Jasher; It is spoken of in 2 Sam. i:18 and Joshua x:13."

John C. Hamer has speculated that narrative points in the Book of Jasher relating to Adam and Eve's "garments" and their acquisition by Nimrod may have influenced the development of the practice of wearing temple garments.

In 1886, Joseph Hyrum Parry of Salt Lake City acquired the rights to the translation from Mordecai Noah's estate. It was published by J. H. Parry & Company in Salt Lake City in 1887.

A number of LDS scholars consider this Book of Jasher to be of authentic ancient Hebrew origin. Some of these suggest that the book likely contains a number of original portions of the Sefer HaYashar referenced in the Old Testament but also has a number of added interpolations. This Joseph Hyrum Parry edition of the Book of Jasher continues to be held in high repute by some Mormons. A number of Mormons have pointed to certain portions of the book that have commonalities to parts of the Joseph Smith Translation of the Bible, particularly those parts dealing with the antediluvian period. The Bible has only scant information about pre-flood times, but both the Book of Jasher and parts of the Joseph Smith Translation of the Bible contain additional information, some of which is strikingly similar. The LDS Church does not officially endorse this Book of Jasher.

== Editions ==
Hebrew editions

- Sefer ha-Yashar, ed. Rosenthal, Berlin, 1898,
- Sefer ha-Yashar, ed. Dan Joseph, Jerusalem, 1986

English translations:

- Book of Jasher Referred to in Joshua and Second Samuel (1840), by Moses Samuel
  - Book of Jasher Referred to in Joshua and Second Samuel (1887), edited by J. H. Parry
  - various print-on-demand reprints including: Kessinger Publishing Company, ISBN 0-7661-0260-2; The Authentic Annals of the Early Hebrews: Also Known as the Book of Jasher, edited by Wayne Simpson (Morris Publishing (NE), 1995) (Hardcover - January 1995) ISBN 1-57502-962-6 hardcover; (Lightcatcher Books, 2003) ISBN 0-9719388-3-0 paperback, etc.
- The Book Jashar: the Lost Book of the Bible, Mentioned in Joshua 10-13, and II Samuel 1-18 (1876), by Rev. Dr. Edward B. M. Browne.
