= Book of Jasher (Jacob Ilive) =

18th-century literary by Jacob Ilive

The Book of Jasher, also called Pseudo-Jasher, is an eighteenth-century literary forgery by Jacob Ilive. It purports to be an English translation by the man Flaccus Albinus Alcuinus of the lost Book of Jasher. It is sometimes called Pseudo-Jasher to distinguish it from the midrashic Sefer haYashar (Book of the Upright, Naples, 1552), which incorporates genuine Jewish legend.

== Details ==
Published in November 1750, the title page of the book says: "translated into English by Flaccus Albinus Alcuinus, of Britain, Abbot of Canterbury, who went on a pilgrimage into the Holy Land and Persia, where he discovered this volume in the city of Gazna." The book claims to be written by Jasher, son of Caleb, one of Moses's lieutenants, who later judged Israel at Shiloh. The book covers biblical history from the creation down to Jasher's own day and was represented as the Lost Book of Jasher mentioned in the Bible.

The Book of Jasher contained naturalistic explanations for the miracles of the Old Testament.

The provenance of the text was immediately suspect: the eighth-century cleric Alcuin could not have produced a translation in the English of the King James Bible. There is an introductory account by Alcuin of his discovery of the manuscript in Persia and its history since the time of Jasher, and a commendation by John Wycliffe.

== Reception ==
The supposed lost book was declared an obvious hoax by the Monthly Review in the December of the year of publication.

The printer Jacob Ilive was sentenced in 1756 to three years' imprisonment with hard labour in the House of Correction at Clerkenwell, for writing, printing, and publishing the anonymous pamphlet Some Remarks on the excellent Discourses lately published by a very worthy Prelate by a Searcher after Religious Truth (1754). The pamphlet was declared to be "a most blasphemous book", for denying the divinity of Jesus Christ and revealed religion. Ilive remained in jail until 1758, spending time writing.

In 1829, a slightly revised and enlarged edition of the Book of Jasher was published in Bristol, provoking attacks against it. Photographic reproduction of this 1829 edition was published in 1934 by the Rosicrucians in San Jose, California, who declared it an inspired work.

== See also ==
- Sefer haYashar for other books with similar titles.

== Bibliography ==
- The Book of Jasher: One of the Sacred Books of the Bible Long Lost or Undiscovered, Flaccus A. Alcuinus (translator) (Kessinger Publishing Company, 1993) ISBN 1-56459-340-1
- The Book of Jasher: with Testimonies and Notes by Flaccus Albinus Alcuinus of Britain (CPA Books, 1998). ISBN 0-944379-20-6
