= Jacob Ilive =

English type-founder, printer and author

Jacob Ilive (1705–1763) was an English type-founder, printer and author. He was a religious radical, who developed neognostic views based on deism. He spent time in prison, convicted of blasphemy.

== Life ==
He was the son of Thomas Ilive (died 1724), a London printer of Aldersgate Street, and his wife Jane James (1669–daughter of Thomas James, another printer. Two brothers, Abraham and Isaac, were also printers. He was apprenticed to his father, and freed from the bond in 1726, by his mother.

Around 1730, Ilive carried on both a type foundry and a printing business. In 1734 he lived by Aldersgate coffee house. From January 1736 to 1738 he published a rival to Edward Cave's Gentleman's Magazine. He sold the foundry in 1740, but kept the printing side going for the rest of his life. He went to live in "London House", the former residence of Christopher Rawlinson.

Ilive died in 1763, aged 58. The printer John Nichols considered him "somewhat disordered in his mind".

== Views and gaol sentence ==
Ilive delivered at Brewers' Hall on 10 September 1733, and at Joiners' Hall two weeks later, an Oration on the plurality of worlds and against the doctrine of eternal punishment. He hired Carpenters' Hall, London Wall, and lectured there on the natural religion. In 1738 he brought out another Oration, for which the venue was Trinity Hall, in Aldersgate Street, on 9 January 1738; it was directed against Henry Felton's True Discourses, on personal identity in the resurrection of the dead.

In 1751 Ilive printed anonymously the Book of Jasher, a purported translation by Alcuin. It was reissued with additions by Rev. Charles Rogers Bond, Bristol, 1829. Behind unconvincing stories of its origin, the book contained naturalistic explanations of Old Testament miracles.

On 20 June 1756 Ilive was sentenced to three years' imprisonment with hard labour in the House of Correction at Clerkenwell, for writing, printing, and publishing an anonymous pamphlet in 1754. Aimed at Thomas Sherlock, it was entitled Some Remarks on the excellent Discourses lately published by a very worthy Prelate by a Searcher after Religious Truth. It was rewritten and enlarged as Remarks on the two Volumes of excellent Discourses lately published by the Bishop of London, 1755. It was declared to be "a most blasphemous book" denying the divinity of Jesus Christ as well as revealed religion. He remained in gaol until 10 June 1758, spending time writing.

The sceptical line Ilive took towards the Genesis creation account had something in common with ideas found earlier in Charles Blount and Charles Gildon. A strong influence came from the writings of William Derham, in particular Astro-Theology (1715). In what was a tolerant epoch of the Church of England, Ilive was in a select group, with Peter Annet and Thomas Woolston, of those against whom blasphemy charges were successfully brought. Sherlock, by legal action, sought to discourage Ilive from publishing other deist writers.

== Works ==
In 1730 Ilive printed his major book, The Layman's Vindication of the Christian Religion, in 2 pts. The parts were:

1. The Layman's general Vindication of Christianity
2. The Layman's Plain Answer to a late Book, a reply to the Grounds and Reasons of Anthony Collins.

His Oration was written in 1729, and published in 1733 (2nd edit. 1736), at the wish of his mother Jane. A Dialogue between a Doctor of the Church of England and Mr. Jacob Ilive upon the subject of the Oration spoke at Joyners' Hall, wherein is proved that the Miracles said to be wrought by Moses were artificial acts only, followed in the same year, in support of the Oration.

In relation to his profession, Ilive wrote:

- Speech to his Brethren the Master Printers on the great Utility of the Art of Printing at a General Meeting 18th July 1750, London, no date.
- The Charter and Grants of the Company of Stationers, with Observations and Remarks thereon, 1762, a pamphlet. It dealt with Ilive's grievances against the management of the Stationers' Company, and he called a meeting on 3 July. A committee was appointed to inquire into the state of the company, and a new master and wardens elected.

Two further pamphlets were:

- Reasons Offered for the Reformation of the House of Correction in Clerkenwell ... To which is Prefixed, a Plan of the Said Prison, ... (1757)
- A Scheme (1759) for the employment of persons sent to prison as disorderly.
