= Joshua =

Central figure in the Hebrew Bible's Book of Joshua

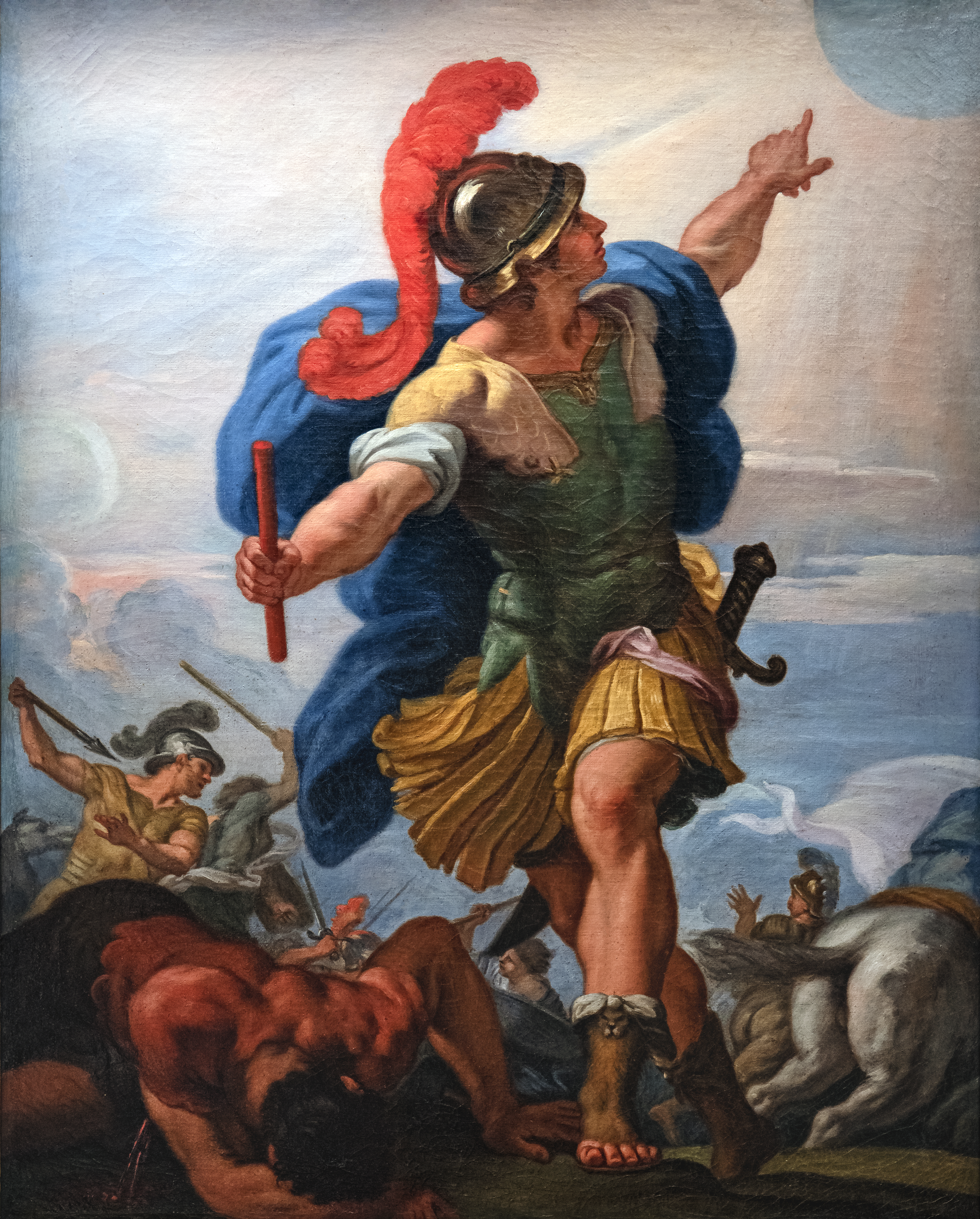
- Joshua stops the race of the sun (c. 1700), by Carlo Maratta

Prophet, Righteous, Forefather
- Born: Hoshea Bar Nun; Unknown; Goshen (Lower Egypt), Ancient Egypt
- Died: Unknown (aged c. 110); Canaan
- Venerated in: Judaism, Christianity, Islam
- Major shrine: Tomb of Joshua (Samaritan and Jewish tradition); Joshua's Hill, Al-Nabi Yusha', etc. (Muslim traditions)
- Feast: 26th of Nisan, Yahrzeit (commemoration of death day): Jewish; July 26: Armenian Apostolic; September 1: Roman Catholicism; September 1: Eastern Orthodox Church; April 14: all saint Sinai monk
- Attributes: Often depicted with Caleb, carrying the grapes out of Canaan

Joshua (/ˈdʒɒʃuə/ JOSH-oo-ə), also known as Yehoshua (Hebrew: יְהוֹשֻׁעַ Yəhōšuaʿ, Tiberian: Yŏhōšuaʿ, lit. 'Yahweh is salvation'), Jehoshua, (Note: Imperial Aramaic: יֵשׁוּעַ Yēšūaʿ; Syriac: ܝܫܘܥ ܒܪ ܢܘܢ Yəšūʿ bar Nōn; Greek: Ἰησοῦς, Arabic: يُوشَعُ ٱبْنُ نُونٍ Yūšaʿ ibn Nūn; Latin: Iosue) or Josue, was Moses' assistant in the books of Exodus and Numbers, and later succeeded Moses as leader of the Israelite tribes in the Book of Joshua of the Hebrew Bible. His name was Hoshea (הוֹשֵׁעַ Hōšēaʿ, lit. 'Save') the son of Nun, of the tribe of Ephraim, but Moses called him "Yehoshua" (translated as "Joshua" in English), the name by which he is commonly known in English. According to the Bible, he was born in Egypt prior to the Exodus.

In Numbers 13:1, the Hebrew Bible identifies Joshua as one of the twelve spies of Israel sent by Moses to explore the land of Canaan. After the death of Moses, he led the Israelite tribes in the conquest of Canaan, and allocated lands to the tribes. According to biblical chronology, Joshua lived some time in the Bronze Age. According to Joshua 24:29 Joshua died at the age of 110.

Joshua holds a position of respect among Muslims, who also see him as the leader of the faithful following the death of Moses. In Islam, it is also believed that Yusha bin Nun (Joshua) was the "attendant" of Moses mentioned in the Quran before Moses meets Khidr. Joshua plays a role in Islamic literature, with significant narration in the hadith.

Mainstream scholarship holds that the Book of Joshua is a theological and nationalist narrative compiled and revised centuries after the supposed conquest, with archaeological evidence largely contradicting its account, though there is ongoing debate over some sites.

== Name ==
The English name "Joshua" is a rendering of the Hebrew Yehoshua, and is mostly interpreted as "Yahweh is salvation"; although others have also alternatively interpreted it as "Yahweh is lordly". The theophoric name appears to be constructed from a combination of the Tetragrammaton with the Hebrew noun יְשׁוּעָה (Modern: yəšūʿa, Tiberian: yăšūʿā), meaning "salvation"; derived from the Hebrew root ישׁע (y-š-ʿ), meaning "to save/help/deliver". Other theophoric names sharing a similar meaning can also be found throughout the Hebrew Bible, such as that of the son of David אֱלִישׁוּעַ (ʾĔlīšūaʿ), whose name means "My El (God) is salvation".

"Jesus" is the English derivative of the Greek transliteration of "Yehoshua" via Latin. In the Septuagint, all instances of the word "Yehoshua" are rendered as "Ἰησοῦς" (Iēsûs), the closest Greek pronunciation of the Imperial Aramaic: יֵשׁוּעַ Yēšūaʿ. Thus, in modern Greek, Joshua is called "Jesus son of Naue" (τοῦ Ναυή, tû Nauḗ) to differentiate him from Jesus. This is also true in some Slavic languages following the Eastern Orthodox tradition (e.g. "Иисус Навин", Iisús Navín, in Bulgarian, Serbian and Russian, but not Czech).

== Biblical narrative ==
=== The Exodus ===
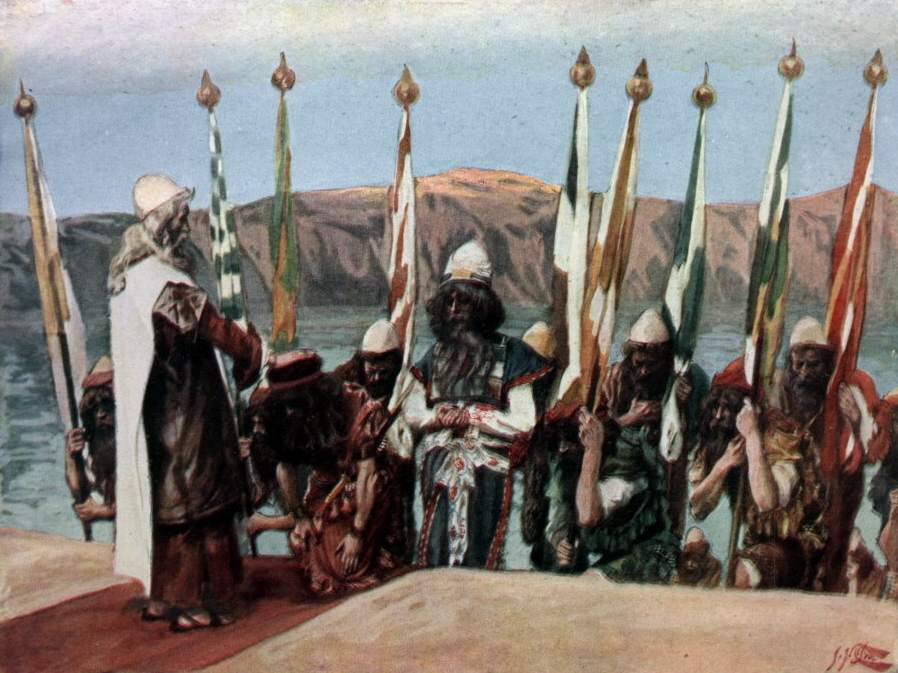
Moses Blesses Joshua Before the High Priest (watercolor circa 1896–1902 by James Tissot)

Joshua was a major figure in the events of the Exodus. He was charged by Moses with selecting and commanding a militia group for their first battle after exiting Egypt, against the Amalekites in Rephidim, in which they were victorious.

He later accompanied Moses when he ascended biblical Mount Sinai to commune with God, visualize God's plan for the Israelite tabernacle, and receive the Ten Commandments. Joshua was with Moses when he descended from the mountain, heard the Israelites' celebrations around the Golden Calf, and broke the tablets bearing the words of the commandments. Similarly, in the narrative which refers to Moses being able to speak with God in his tent of meeting outside the camp, Joshua is seen as custodian of the tent ('tabernacle of meeting') when Moses returned to the Israelite encampment. However, when Moses returned to the mountain to re-create the tablets recording the Ten Commandments, Joshua was not present, as the biblical text states "no man shall come up with you".

Later, Joshua was identified as one of the twelve spies sent by Moses to explore and report on the land of Canaan, and only he and Caleb gave an encouraging report, a reward for which would be that only these two of their entire generation would enter the promised land.

According to Joshua 1:1, God appointed Joshua to succeed Moses as leader of the Israelites along with giving him a blessing of invincibility during his lifetime. The first part of the book of Joshua covers the period when he led the conquest of Canaan.

=== Conquest of Canaan ===
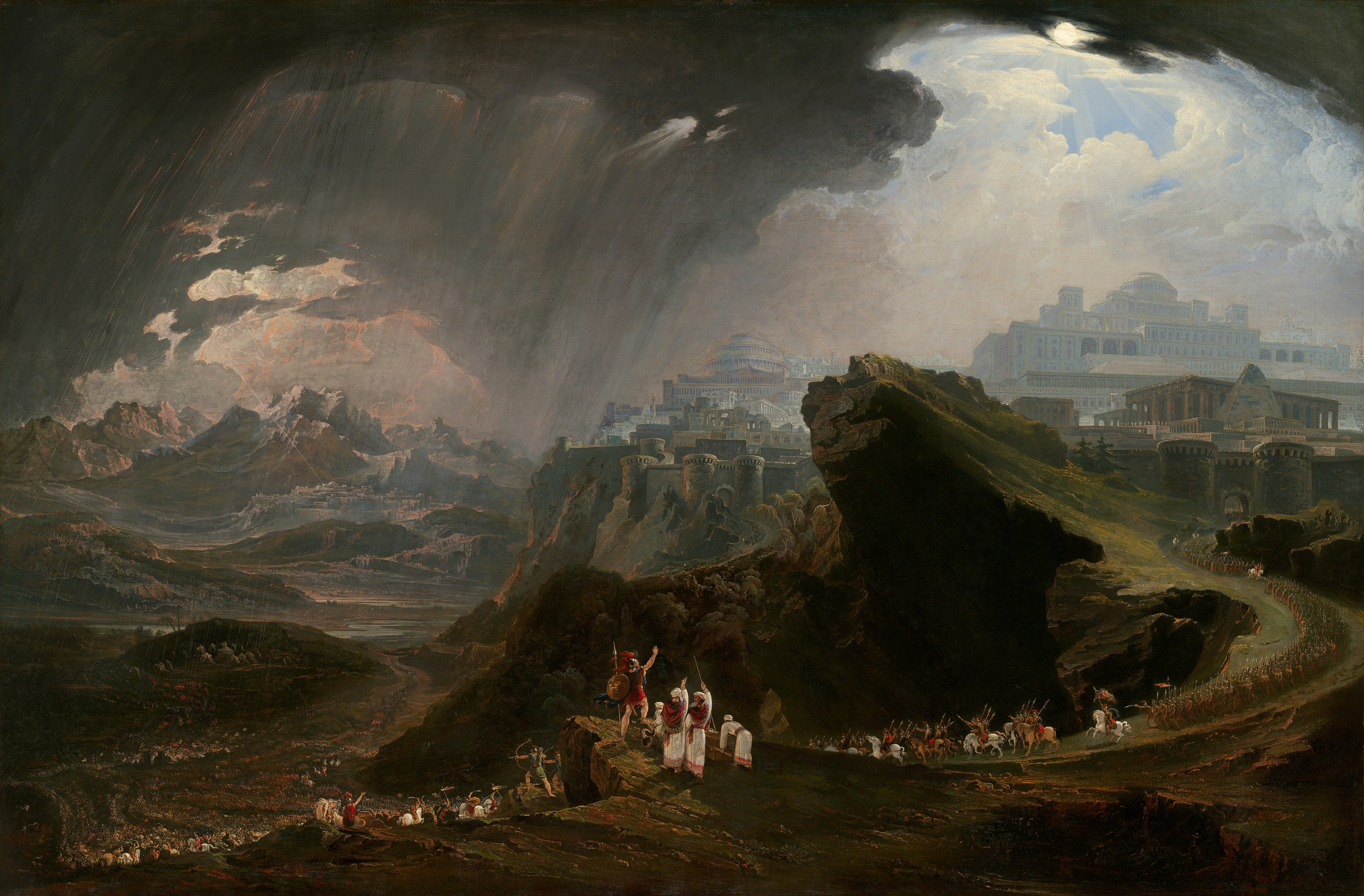
Joshua Commanding the Sun to Stand Still upon Gibeon by John Martin, 1816

At the Jordan River, the waters parted, as they had for Moses at the Red Sea. The first battle after the crossing of the Jordan was the fall of Jericho. Joshua led the destruction of Jericho, then moved on to Ai, a small neighboring city to the west. However, they were defeated with thirty-six Israelite deaths. The defeat was attributed to Achan taking an "accursed thing" from Jericho; and was followed by Achan and his family and animals being stoned to death to restore God's favor. Joshua then went to defeat Ai.

The Israelites faced an alliance of five Amorite kings from Jerusalem, Hebron, Jarmuth, Lachish, and Eglon. At Gibeon, Joshua asked the LORD to cause the Sun and Moon to stand still, so that he could finish the battle in daylight. According to the text, the Sun stopped in the middle of the sky and delayed going down about a full day. This event is most notable because "There has been no day like it before or since, when the LORD heeded the voice of a man, for the LORD fought for Israel." The LORD also fought for the Israelites in this battle, for he hurled huge hailstones from the sky which killed more Canaanites than those which the Israelites slaughtered. From there on, Joshua was able to lead the Israelites to several victories, securing much of the land of Canaan. He presided over the Israelite gatherings at Gilgal and Shiloh which allocated land to the tribes of Israel (Joshua 14:1–5 and 18:1–10), and the Israelites rewarded him with the Ephraimite city of Timnath-heres or Timnath-serah, where he settled (Joshua 19:50).

According to the Talmud, Joshua in his book enumerated only those towns on the frontier. (Note: Babylonian Talmud, Baba Bathra 56a; Beitza 25b, s.v. חצובא מקטע רגליהון דרשיעי. Quote: "ʻThe sea squill (Urginea maritima) amputates the leg of the wicked’. Explained by Talmudic exegete, Rashi, to mean a plant whose roots penetrate and go down deeply, without spreading-out to the sides at all, and they plant it between the boundaries of fields, with which Joshua [formerly] divided the country by designated borders for Israel." ʻAmputates the leg of the wicked’, [meaning], on the Day of Judgment, in the sense that they (the wicked) steal, and covet, and reappropriate the property bounds [of others], without taking a lesson from it" (END QUOTE). Cf. Hai Gaon (1921), "Hai Gaon's Commentary on Seder Taharot", in Epstein, J.N. (ed.), The Geonic Commentary on Seder Taharot - Attributed to Rabbi Hai Gaon (in Hebrew), vol. 1, Berlin: Itzkowski, pp. 13–14, OCLC 13977130, s.v. יבלית in Mishnah Keilim 3:6.)

=== Death ===
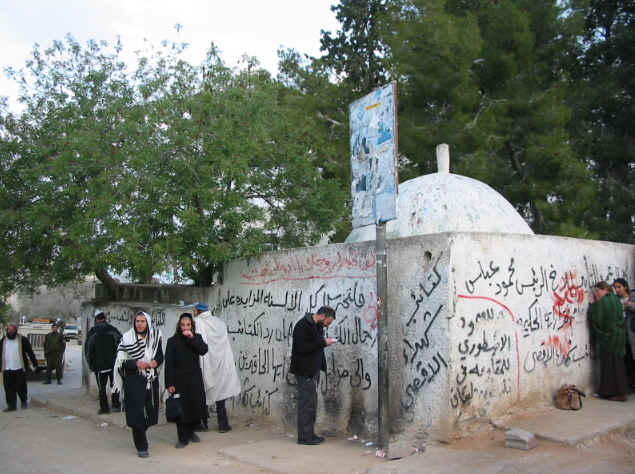
Joshua's Tomb in Kifl Haris near Nablus, West Bank, on Joshua's yartzeit 2007

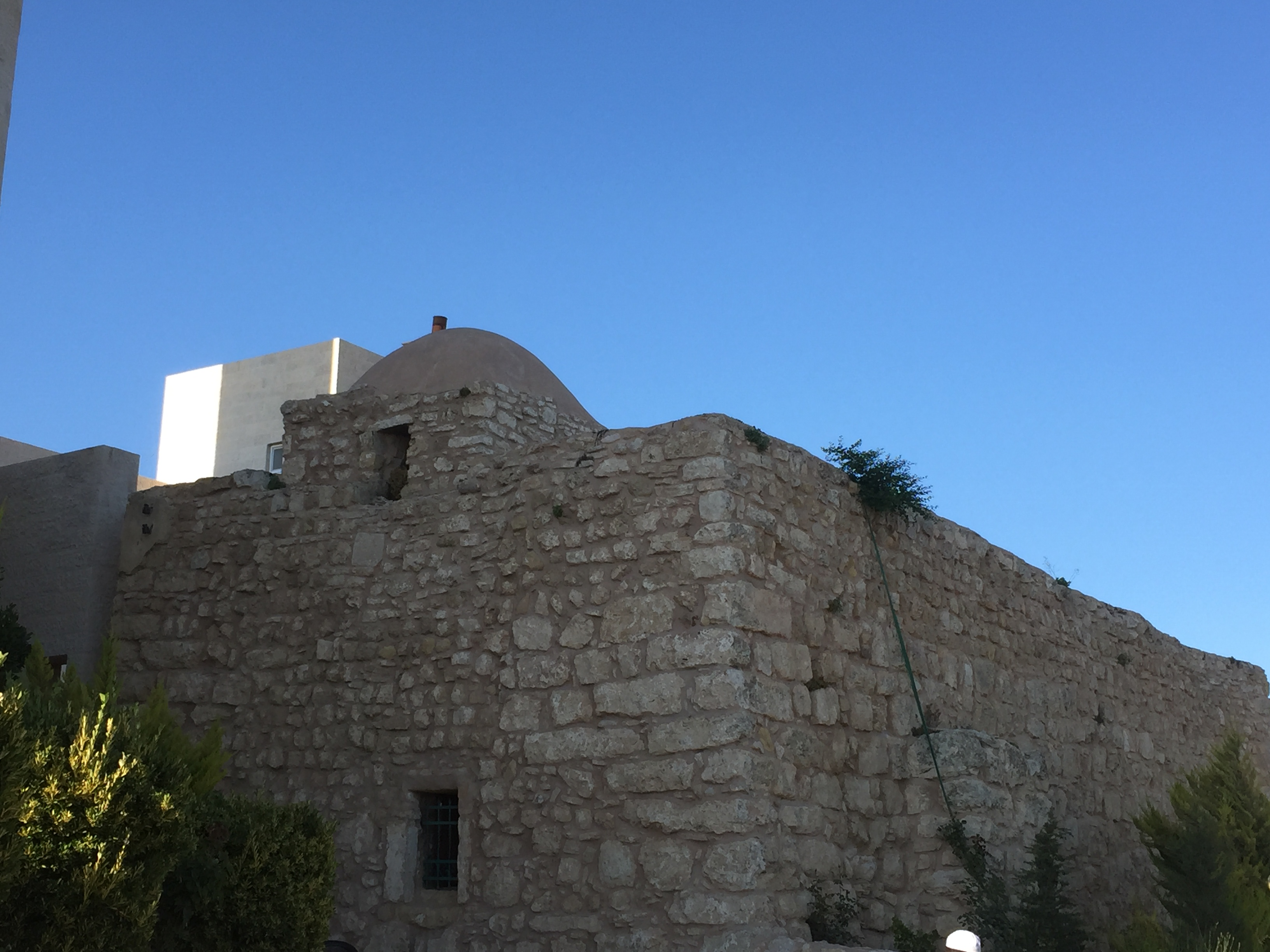
Joshua's Tomb in Jordan

When he was "old and well advanced in years", Joshua convened the elders and chiefs of the Israelites and exhorted them to have no fellowship with the native population, because it could lead them to be unfaithful to God. At a general assembly of the clans at Shechem, he took leave of the people, admonishing them to be loyal to their God, who had been so mightily manifested in the midst of them. As a witness of their promise to serve God, Joshua set up a great stone under an oak by the sanctuary of God. Soon afterward he died, at the age of 110, and was buried at Timnath-heres, in the hill country of Ephraim, north of Mount Gaash.

== Historicity ==
=== Current mainstream opinion ===
The prevailing scholarly view is that the Book of Joshua is not a factual account of historical events. The apparent setting of Joshua is the 13th century BCE which was a time of widespread city-destruction, but with a few exceptions (Hazor, Lachish) the destroyed cities are not the ones the Bible associates with Joshua, and the ones it does associate with him show little or no sign of even being occupied at the time. Given its lack of historicity, Carolyn Pressler in her commentary for the Westminster Bible Companion series suggests that readers of Joshua should give priority to its theological message ("what passages teach about God") and be aware of what these would have meant to audiences in the seventh and sixth centuries BCE. Richard Nelson explained that the needs of the centralised monarchy favoured a single story of origins, combining old traditions of an exodus from Egypt, belief in a national god as "divine warrior," and explanations for ruined cities, social stratification and ethnic groups, and contemporary tribes.

It has been argued that the Book of Joshua holds little historical value. The archaeological evidence shows that Jericho and Ai were not occupied in the Near Eastern Late Bronze Age, although recent excavations at Jericho have questioned this. The story of the conquest perhaps represents the nationalist propaganda of the eighth century BCE kings of Judah and their claims to the territory of the Kingdom of Israel, incorporated into an early form of Joshua written late in the reign of king Josiah (reigned 640–609 BCE). The book was probably revised and completed after the fall of Jerusalem to the Neo-Babylonian Empire in 586 BCE, and possibly after the return from the Babylonian exile in 538 BCE.

Nadav Na'aman believes Joshua 10 might be a variant of a story found in 2 Samuel 5 and 1 Chronicles 14, in which David takes his army to confront the Philistines, where Yahweh smites the Philistines before David. Na'aman also points to similarities with the campaigns fought by Sennacherib in the same region in 701 BCE, where numerous fortified cities were captured and destroyed including Lachish, Libnah, Eglon (Tel' Eton), and Debir. Assyrian inscriptions also describe how the storm god Hadad wiped out fleeing armies of the kings of Urartu with rain and stones from heaven, while the enemy hid in "the recesses of the mountain". Comparatively, Sennacherib in his conquest accounts hangs the corpses of the chief Philistine rulers of Ekron on poles.

=== M. Noth (1930s) ===
In the 1930s Martin Noth made a sweeping criticism of the usefulness of the Book of Joshua for history. Noth was a student of Albrecht Alt, who emphasized form criticism and the importance of etiology. Alt and Noth posited a peaceful movement of the Israelites into various areas of Canaan, contra the Biblical account.

=== W.F. Albright (1930s) ===
William Foxwell Albright questioned the "tenacity" of etiologies, which were key to Noth's analysis of the campaigns in Joshua. Archaeological evidence in the 1930s showed that the city of Ai, an early target for conquest in the putative Joshua account, had existed and been destroyed, but in the 22nd century BCE. Some alternate sites for Ai have been proposed which would partially resolve the discrepancy in dates, but these sites have not been widely accepted.

=== K. Kenyon (1951) ===
In 1951 Kathleen Kenyon showed that City IV at Tell es-Sultan (Jericho) was destroyed at the end of the Middle Bronze Age (c. 2100–1550 BCE), not during the Late Bronze Age (c. 1550–1200 BCE). Kenyon argued that the early Israelite campaign could not be historically corroborated, but rather explained as an etiology of the location and a representation of the Israelite settlement.

=== G.E. Wright (1955) ===
In 1955, G. Ernest Wright discussed the correlation of archaeological data to the early Israelite campaigns, which he divided into three phases per the Book of Joshua. He pointed to two sets of archaeological findings that "seem to suggest that the biblical account is in general correct regarding the nature of the late thirteenth and twelfth-eleventh centuries in the country" (i.e., "a period of tremendous violence"). He gives particular weight to what were then recent digs at Hazor by Yigael Yadin.

=== Joshua's sun miracle ===
Baruch Margalit refers to the sun standing still in the Joshua story as the "most difficult section in the entire narrative". In the poem, Joshua addresses the sun directly, and it obeys his command, while in another verse it was Yahweh who heeded Joshua, not the sun. Theodore Hiebert argued that both the sun and moon are standing by to join Yahweh into battle, being seen in context with a similar passage in Habakkuk 3. This would then not be focused on extending daylight, but about preparing celestial forces for war in a battle incantation ritual. Margalit believes the poetic fragment from the Book of Jasher was reinterpreted to depict the miraculous long day, when it was originally about the arrival of the heavenly host. Another view is that Joshua is asserting his authority over the sun and moon which are personified Canaanite deities, or that the Israelite God himself was envisioned as a solar deity.

The National Center for Science Education (NCSE) published a critique by astronomer William H. Jefferys refuting creationist claims of a "missing day" in history allegedly discovered by NASA. The NCSE identified the story as manufactured, and an attempt to scientifically validate the miraculous standstill of the sun in the Book of Joshua. John Walton writing for BioLogos, interprets the events through the lens of ancient Near-Eastern omen literature. He contends that seeing the moon and sun in certain positions would have demoralized the forces of Canaan who relied on celestial signs.

During the early modern period, this story became a point of conflict between theologians and astronomers when Nicolaus Copernicus proposed that Earth orbits the Sun, under his model of Heliocentrism. Galileo Galilei who defended Copernicus' ideas would spend much time writing a Letter to Grand Duchess Christina, arguing Joshua 10 could be interpreted differently.

== Religious views ==
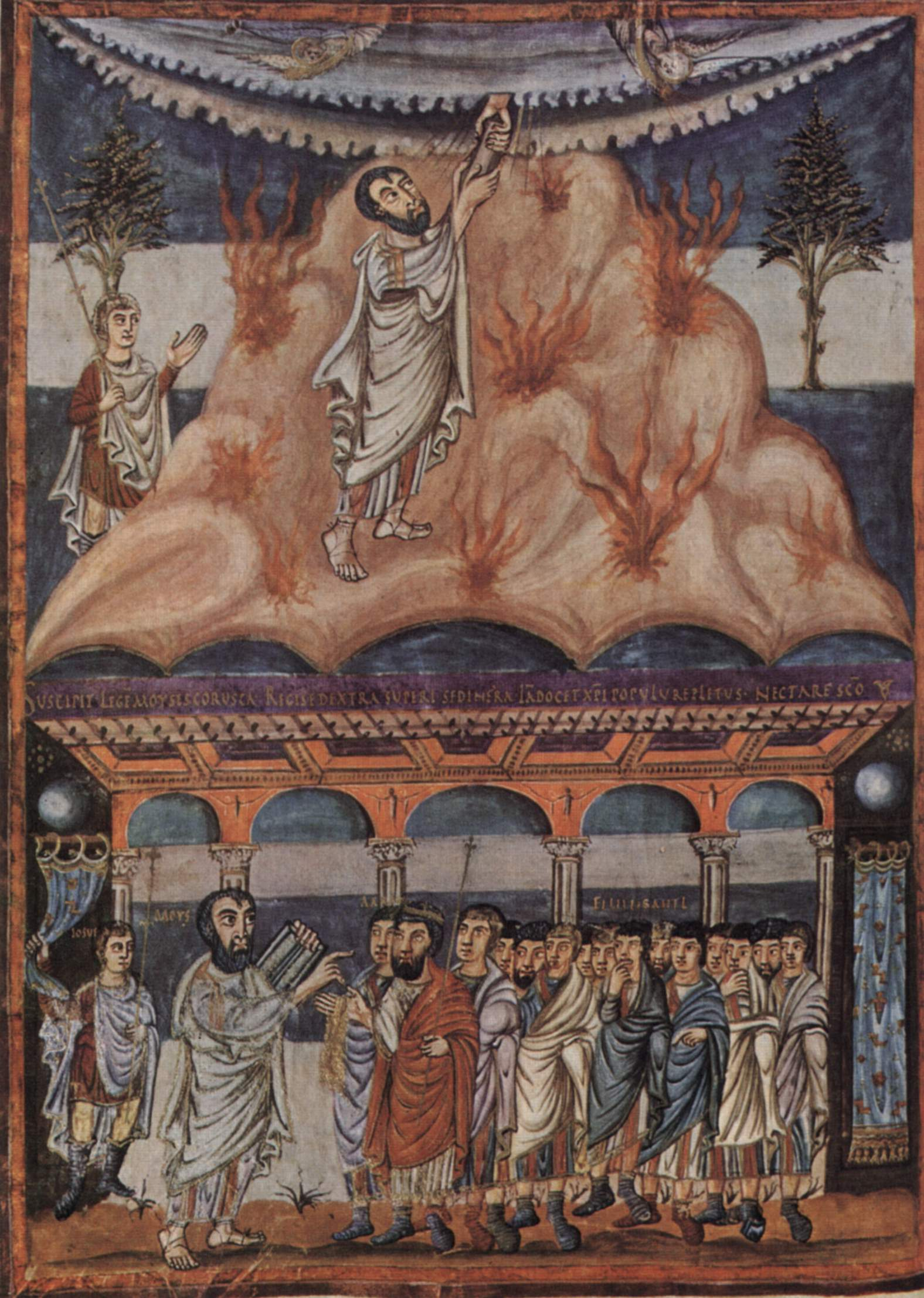
Joshua and the Israelite people, Carolingian miniature, c. 840

=== In Judaism ===
==== In rabbinical literature ====
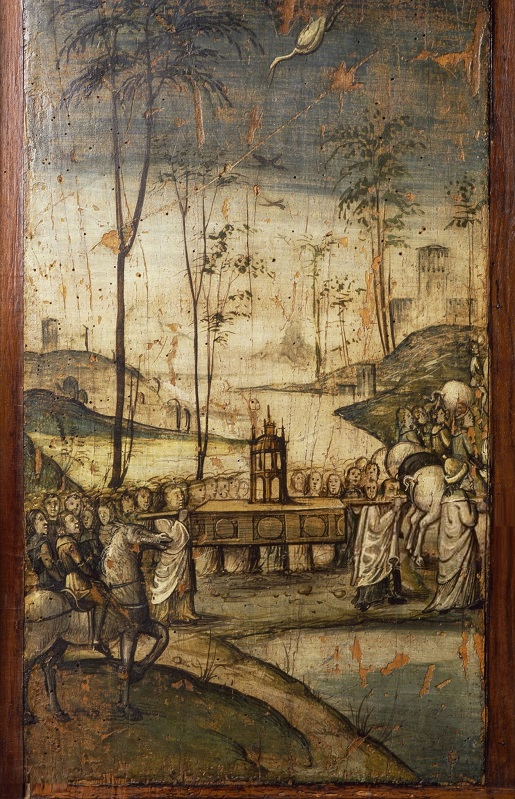
The Israelites led by Joshua crossing the Jordan River with the Ark, Old Sacristy, Milan Italy, 15th c.

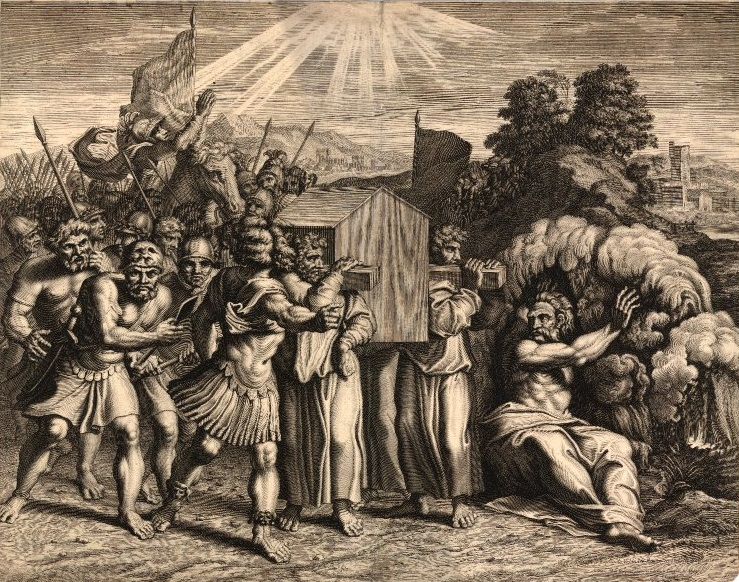
Robert Hecquet, Israelites led by Joshua Crossing the Jordan River

In rabbinic literature Joshua is regarded as a faithful, humble, deserving, wise man. Biblical verses illustrative of these qualities and of their reward are applied to him. "He that waits on his master shall be honored" is construed as a reference to Joshua, as is also the first part of the same verse, "Whoso keeps the fig-tree shall eat the fruit thereof". That "honor shall uphold the humble in spirit" is proved by Joshua's victory over Amalek. Not the sons of Moses—as Moses himself had expected—but Joshua was appointed as Moses' successor. Moses was shown how Joshua reproved that Othniel.

"God would speak to Moses face to face, like someone would speak to his friend. Then he would return to the camp. But his attendant, Joshua the son of Nun, a young man, would not leave the tent. Joshua never moved from the tent". Didn't Joshua leave the tent to eat, sleep or attend to his needs? This praise shows that Joshua had complete faith in Moses, the Tzaddik. One who has this faith is cognizant of the tzaddik in everything he does; he remains steadfastly with the tzaddik whatever he does.

According to rabbinic tradition, Joshua, when dividing the Land of Canaan among the twelve tribes of Israel, planted sea squill (Hebrew: חצוב) to mark off the butts and bounds of tribal properties.

Moreover, Joshua, on dividing the land of Canaan amongst the tribes of Israel, made the tribes agree to ten conditions, the most important of which being the common use of the forests as pasture for cattle, and the common right of fishing in the Sea of Tiberias. Natural springs were to be used for drinking and laundry by all tribes, although the tribe to which the water course fell had the first rights. Prickly burnet (Sarcopoterium spinosum) and the camelthorn (Alhagi maurorum) could be freely collected as firewood by any member of any tribe, in any tribal territory.

==== In prayer ====
According to Jewish religious tradition, upon making Aliyah by crossing the Jordan River to enter the Land of Israel, Joshua composed the Aleinu prayer thanking God. This idea was first cited in the Kol Bo of the late 14th Century. Several medieval commentators noticed that Joshua's shorter birth name, Hosea, appears in the first few verses of Aleinu in reverse acrostic: ע – עלינו, ש – שלא שם, ו – ואנחנו כורעים, ה – הוא אלוקינו. The Teshuvot HaGeonim, a Geonic responsum, discussed that Joshua composed the Aleinu because although the Israelites had made Aliyah to the Promised Land, they were surrounded by other peoples, and he wanted the Jews to draw a clear distinction between themselves, who knew and accepted the sovereignty of God, and those nations of the world which did not. In the modern era, religious Jews still pray the Aliyah inspired Aleinu three times daily, including on the High Holidays. The Aleinu prayer begins:

It is our duty to praise the Master of all, to exalt the Creator of the Universe, who has not made us like the nations of the world and has not placed us like the families of the earth, who has not designed our destiny to be like theirs, nor our lot like that of all their multitude.

=== In Christianity ===
Most modern Bibles translate Hebrews 4:8–10 to identify Jesus as a better Joshua, as Joshua led Israel into the rest of Canaan, but Jesus leads the people of God into "God's rest". Among the early Church Fathers, Joshua is considered a type of Jesus Christ.

The story of Joshua and the Canaanite kings is also alluded to in the 2 Meqabyan, a book considered canonical in the Ethiopian Orthodox Tewahedo Church.

=== In Islam ===
Prophet Yūšaʿ Alayhi as-Salam
- يُوشَعُ Joshua
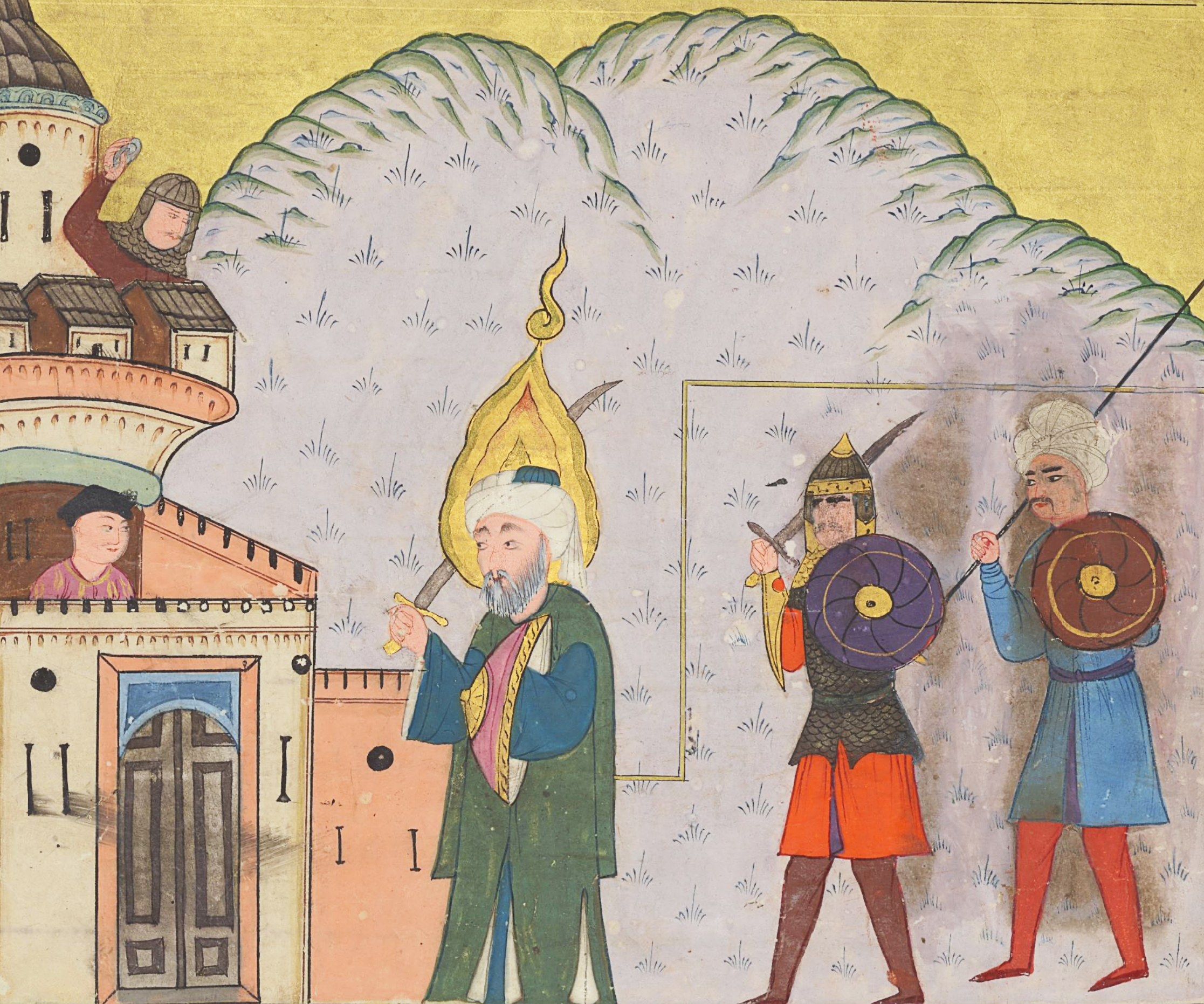
- Yusha (middle) fighting in the Battle of Ariha.

Prophet of Islam
- Preceded by: Kalib
- Succeeded by: Šamūʾīl

Personal life
- Parent: Nun (father)

Religious life
- Religion: Islam

==== Quranic references ====
Joshua (Arabic: يُوشَعُ بْنُ نُونٍ, Yūšaʿ ibn Nūn [juːʃaʕ ibn nuːn], is not mentioned by name in the Quran, but his name appears in other Islamic literature. In the Quranic account of the conquest of Canaan, Joshua and Caleb are referenced, but not named, as two God-fearing men on whom God "had bestowed His grace".

They said, "Moses, there is a fearsome people in this land. We will not go there until they leave. If they leave, then we will enter." Yet the two men whom God had blessed among those who were afraid said, "Go in to them through the gate and when you go in you will overcome them. If you are true believers, put your trust in God.

— Quran, sura 5 (Al-Ma'ida), ayah 22–23, Haleem translation

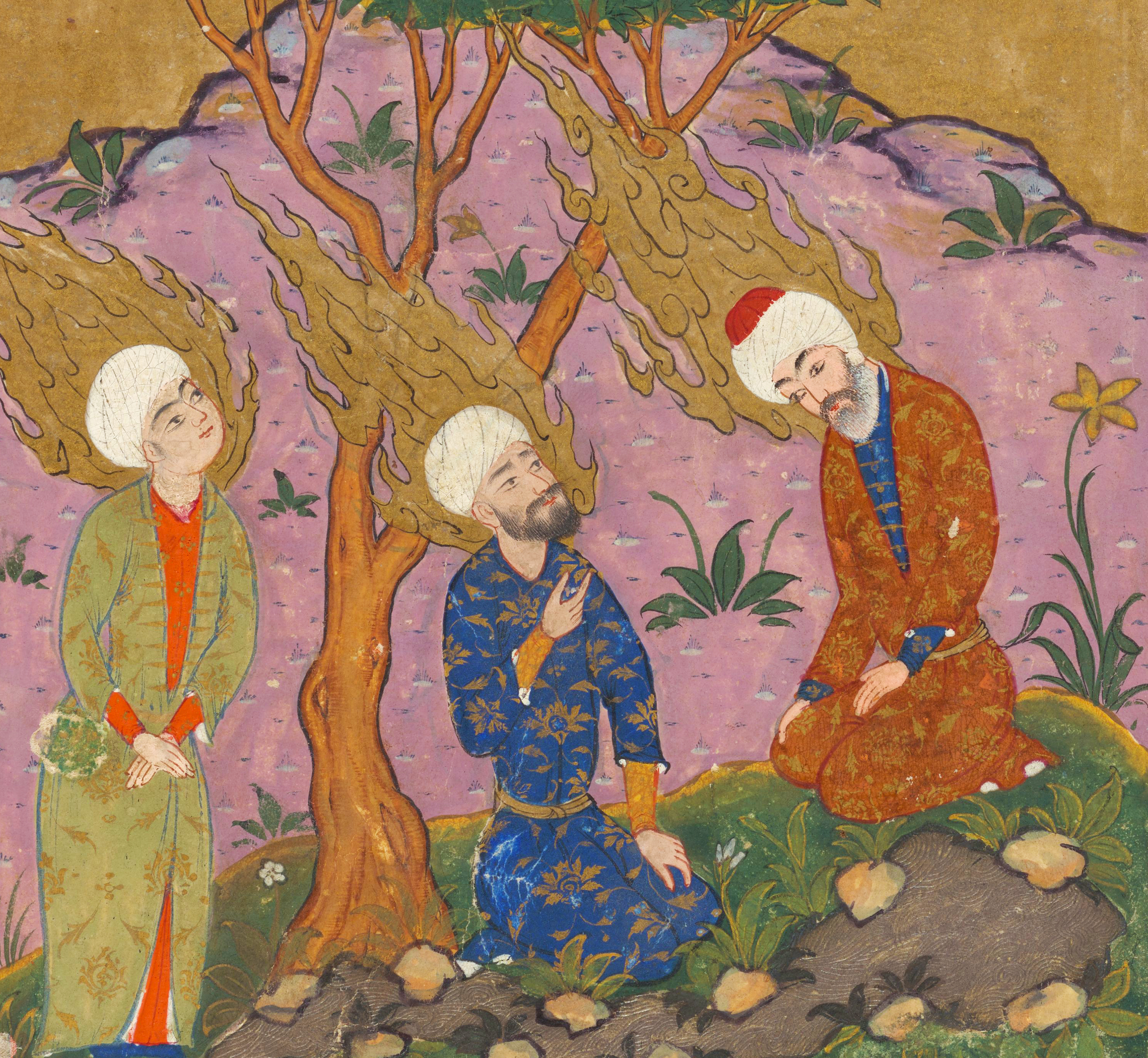
Islamic depiction of Yusha and Musa visiting Khidr from a Persian 1580 manuscript.

Joshua is also referred to in the journey Musa (Moses) took with him to find Khidr.

And remember when Moses said to his young assistant, "I will never give up until I reach the junction of the two seas, even if I travel for ages". But when they finally reached the point where the seas met, they forgot their salted fish, and it made its way into the sea, slipping away wondrously. He replied, "Do you remember when we rested by the rock? That is when I forgot the fish. None made me forget to mention this except Satan. And the fish made its way into the sea miraculously". Moses responded, "That is exactly what we were looking for". So they returned, retracing their footsteps. There they found a servant of Ours, to whom We had granted mercy from Us and enlightened with knowledge of Our Own.

— Quran, chapter 6 (al-Kahf), verses 60-65

The narration collected by Bukhari reports that a man approached Moses after he gave a talk and asked him, "Who is the most knowledgeable person on earth?" Moses responded, "That would be me!" So Allah revealed to Moses that he should not have said this and there was in fact someone who was more knowledgeable than him. Moses was commanded to travel to meet this man, named Al-Khaḍir, at the junction of the two seas. Islamic scholars have argued this could be the northern part of the Sinai Peninsula between the Red Sea and the Mediterranean Sea, the southern part of Sinai where the Rea Sea splits into the Gulf of Suez and the Gulf of Aqaba, or the Bosporus in Istanbul which is a strait between the Black Sea and the Sea of Marmara.

==== Hadith, exegesis, traditions ====
Joshua was regarded by some classical scholars as the prophetic successor to Moses (موسى) (Note: Joshua is mentioned as a prophet in Ibn Kathir's Stories of the Prophets) Al-Tabari relates in his History of the Prophets and Kings that Joshua was one of the twelve spies, and Muslim scholars believe that the two believing spies referred to in the Quran are Joshua and Caleb. Joshua was exceptional among the Israelites for being one of the few faithful followers of Allah.

Significant events from Joshua's Muslim narratives include the crossing of the Jordan River and the conquest of Bait al-Maqdis.

The traditional Muslim scholastic commentaries has narrated the miracle which shown by Joshua as a sign that he is a prophet in Islam. Ibn Kathir gave commentary of Musnad Ahmad ibn Hanbal Hadith that during the siege of Jerusalem, Yoshua prayed to God to withheld the sun until he won, which resulted in the day did not cease, and the sun only set after the Israelites under Joshua manage to capture the city. al-Jalalayn says, "Ahmad [b. Hanbal] reported in his Musnad, the [following] hadīth, 'The sun was never detained for any human, except for Joshua during those days in which he marched towards the Holy House [of Jerusalem]'." According to Islamic tradition, Joshua lived for about 110 years, and his shrine is located in the city of Hārith in the region of Shām (Greater Syria).

Islamic literature includes traditions of Joshua not found in the Hebrew Bible. Joshua is credited with being present at Moses's death and literature records that Moses's garments were with Joshua at the time of his departure. In Sahih Bukhari and Sahih Muslim, Joshua is mentioned as Yusha' bin Nun and is the attendant to Moses during his meeting with Khidr. This hadith episode was used by scholars for the exegesis of Quran scripture chapter Al-Kahf about the journey of Moses.

== In art and literature ==
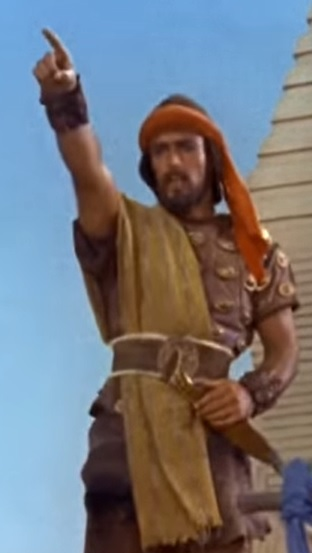
Joshua in The Ten Commandments, 1956

In the literary tradition of medieval Europe, Joshua is known as one of the Nine Worthies. In The Divine Comedy Joshua's spirit appears to Dante in the Heaven of Mars, where he is grouped with the other "warriors of the faith."

Baroque composer Georg Frideric Handel composed the oratorio Joshua in 1747. Composer Franz Waxman composed an oratorio Joshua in 1959. Marc-Antoine Charpentier composed Josue (H.404 and H.404 a), an oratorio for soloists, double chorus, double orchestra and continuo, in 1680.

== Nomenclature in biology ==
According to legend, Mormon pioneers in the United States first referred to the yucca brevifolia agave plant as the Joshua tree because its branches reminded them of Joshua stretching his arms upward in supplication, guiding the travelers westward.

Joshua is commemorated in the scientific name of a species of snake, Joshua's blind snake (Trilepida joshuai), the holotype of which was collected at Jericó, Antioquia, Colombia.

== Jewish holidays ==
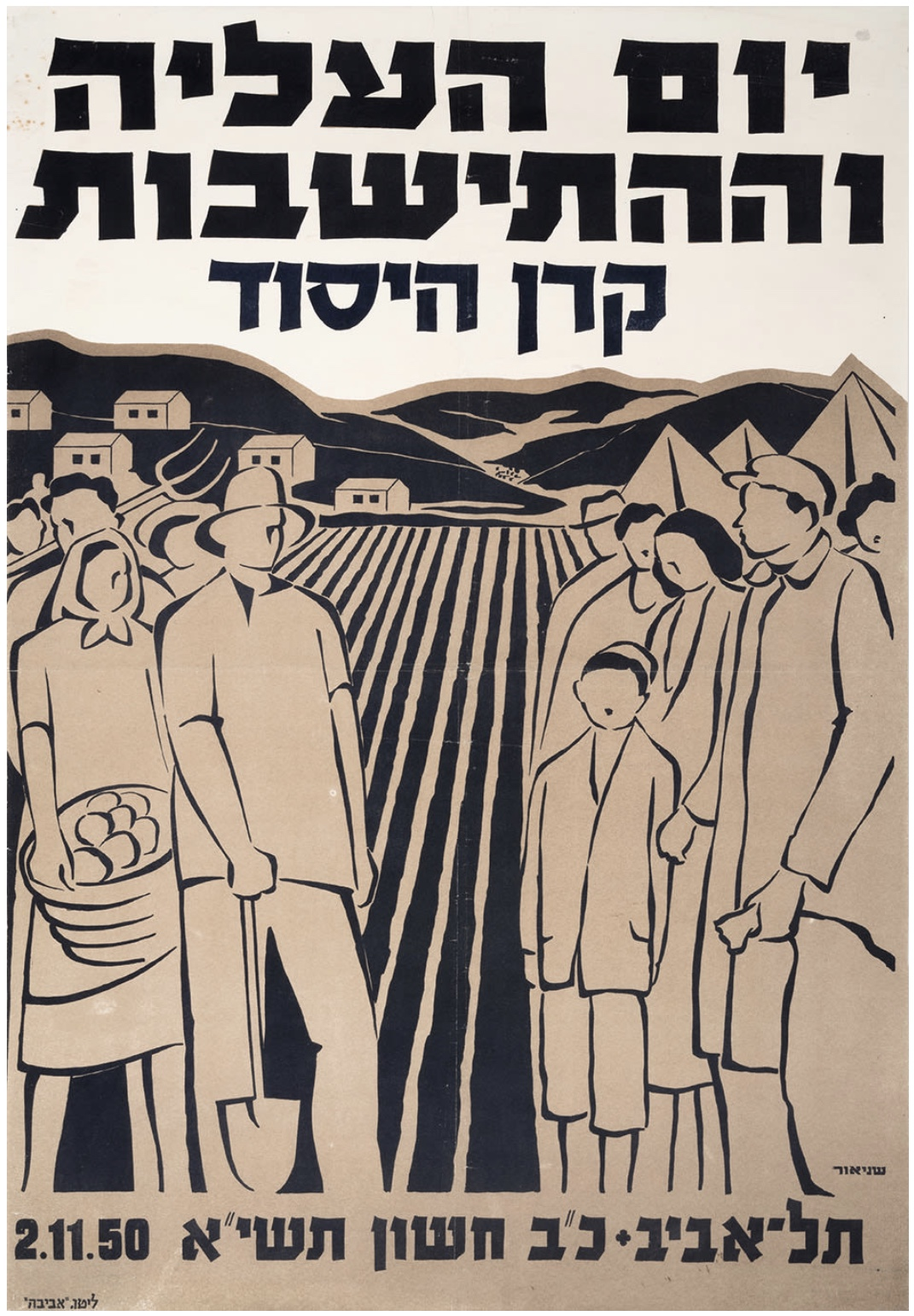
Israeli poster celebrating Yom HaAliyah (Aliyah Day) from the Yosef Matisyahu Collection

=== Religious holiday ===
The annual commemoration of Joshua's yahrtzeit (the anniversary of his death) is marked on the 26th of Nisan on the Hebrew calendar. Thousands make the pilgrimage to the Tomb of Joshua at Kifl Haris near Nablus, West Bank, on the preceding night.

=== Israeli Zionist holiday ===
Yom HaAliyah (Aliyah Day; Hebrew: יום העלייה) is an Israeli national holiday celebrated annually on the tenth of the Hebrew month of Nisan, as per the opening clause of the Yom HaAliyah Law, as a Zionist celebration of "Jewish immigration to the Land of Israel as the basis for the existence of the State of Israel", and secondarily "to mark the date of entry into the Land of Israel", i.e. to commemorate Joshua having led the Israelites across the Jordan River into the Land of Israel while carrying the Ark of the Covenant.

== Tomb of Joshua ==
=== Samaritan and Jewish traditions ===
According to a Samaritan tradition, noted in 1877, the tombs of Joshua and Caleb were in Kifl Haris.

According to Joshua 24:30, the tomb of Joshua is in Timnath-heres, and Jewish tradition also places the tombs of Joshua's father, Nun, and his companion, Caleb, at that site, which is identified by Orthodox Jews with Kifl Haris. Thousands make the pilgrimage to the tombs on the annual commemoration of Joshua's death, 26th of Nisan on the Hebrew calendar.

It seems that old Jewish traditions once associated Meron in the Upper Galilee with the burial site of Joshua.

=== Islamic sites ===
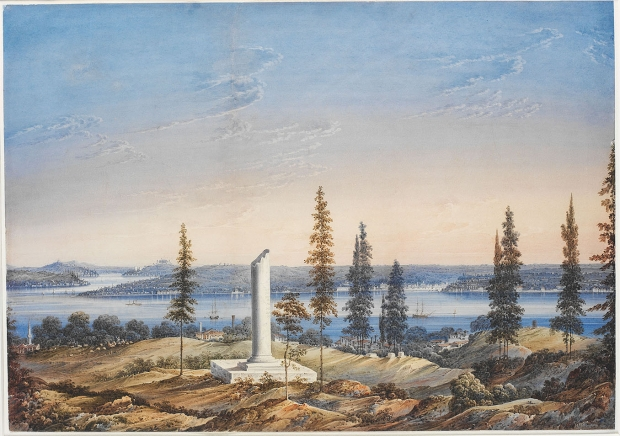
The Bosporus from Joshua's Hill (Giant's Grave) with a broken column, by Joseph Schranz (1803–1864/6), courtesy of the Ömer M Koç Collection

Joshua is believed by some Muslims to be buried on Joshua's Hill in the Beykoz district of Istanbul. Alternative traditional sites for his tomb are situated in Israel (the Shia shrine at Al-Nabi Yusha'), Jordan (An-Nabi Yusha' bin Noon, a Sunni shrine near the city of Al-Salt), Iran (Historical cemetery of Takht e Foolad in Esfahan) and Iraq (the Nabi Yusha' shrine of Baghdad). A local tradition combining three versions of three different Yushas, including biblical Joshua, places the tomb inside a cave in the Tripoli Mountains, overlooking the coastal town of el-Minyieh near Tripoli, Lebanon.

== See also ==
- Atreus
- Joshua Roll

Joshua Tribe of Ephraim
| Preceded by Moses | Judge of Israel | Succeeded by Othniel |
