= Book of Jasher (biblical book) =

Lost biblical book

The Book of Jasher (also spelled Jashar; Hebrew: סֵפֶר הַיׇּשָׁר, romanized: Sēfer haYyāšār), which means the Book of the Upright or the Book of the Just Man, is a lost book mentioned in the Hebrew Bible, often interpreted as a lost non-canonical book. Numerous forgeries purporting to be rediscovered copies of this lost book have been written. A different interpretation identifies it as a reference to the Pentateuch (Torah), specifically the Book of Genesis, an interpretation which is notably favored by the Jewish scholar Rashi in his commentary on the Hebrew Bible (see below his commentary on Joshua). The title "Book of the Just Man" is the traditional Greek and Latin translation.

== Authenticity ==
The original Book of Jasher is generally considered to have been lost, while several later medieval works have circulated under the same title. The relationship of these works to the original text, if any, remains uncertain.

== Biblical references ==
The book is mentioned twice in the Hebrew Bible. A possible third reference exists with a variant spelling.

=== In Joshua ===
According to the Book of Joshua, while Joshua was winning a battle against Adonizedek (king of Jerusalem) and his allies, Joshua prayed for the sun and moon to stand still. Joshua 10:13 then states:

And the Sun stood still, and the Moon stayed,
until the people had avenged themselves on their enemies.
Is this not written in Sefer HaYashar?

— Joshua 10:13

The presence of this event in a book of poetry has been interpreted as a poetic description of the prolonged battle.

According to the medieval Jewish scholar Rashi, "Sefer HaYashar" in this verse refers to the Pentateuch: Jacob's prophecy regarding Joshua's ancestor Ephraim—"His seed will fill the nations"—was fulfilled when Joshua's victory gave him renown among the various nations who heard of the victory.

=== In Samuel ===
According to the Book of Samuel, when David spoke his lament over the deaths of Saul and Jonathan, he began as follows:

To teach the sons of Judah [the use of] the bow. Behold, it is written in the book of Jasher.

— 2 Samuel 1:18

The King James Version of the English Christian Bible includes the words "the use of" in italics, material which its translator(s) added in order to render the text into what they considered understandable and comfortable English. According to some other translations, such as the English Standard Version, "the bow" (קָ֑שֶׁת, qāšeṯ) that David 'taught' is hypothesised to be a poetic lament over the deaths of Saul and Jonathan. According to this interpretation, this "bow" refers to a lament or tune in the Book of Jashar that was taught to the Israelites.

The Septuagint translation renders Sefer haYashar in both cases as the "Book of the Just". It also misses the reference to "the bow". It reads:

καὶ εἶπεν τοῦ διδάξαι τοὺς υἱοὺς Ιουδα ἰδοὺ γέγραπται ἐπὶ βιβλίου τοῦ εὐθοῦς
And he gave orders to teach it to the sons of Judah: behold, it is written in the book of the just.

— 2 Samuel 1:18, Septuagint

=== In Kings ===
A possible third reference appears in 1 Kings 8. In the Septuagint (though not in the Hebrew text or most translations), verse 8:53 says that the preceding prayer of Solomon is written "in the book of song" (ἐν βιβλίῳ τῆς ᾠδῆς). The Hebrew version of "book of song" could be ספר השיר (Sefer haShir), which is the same as Sefer HaYashar with two letters transposed. According to Alexander Rofeh, this suggests that the name Sefer HaYashar could be related to its function as a hymnal, and the second word might have originally been שִׁיר (shir, 'song') or יָשִׁיר (yashir, 'he will sing').

== See also ==
- Book of Jasher (Jacob Ilive) – an eighteenth-century literary forgery which purports to be an English translation of the lost Book of Jasher
- Non-canonical books referenced in the Bible
- Sefer haYashar (midrash) – a Hebrew midrash, also known as The Book of Jasher, named after the lost Book of Jasher
- Yehimilk inscription – uses the same or cognate word: YŠR, upright
