= Emil Schürer =

German theologian (1844–1910)

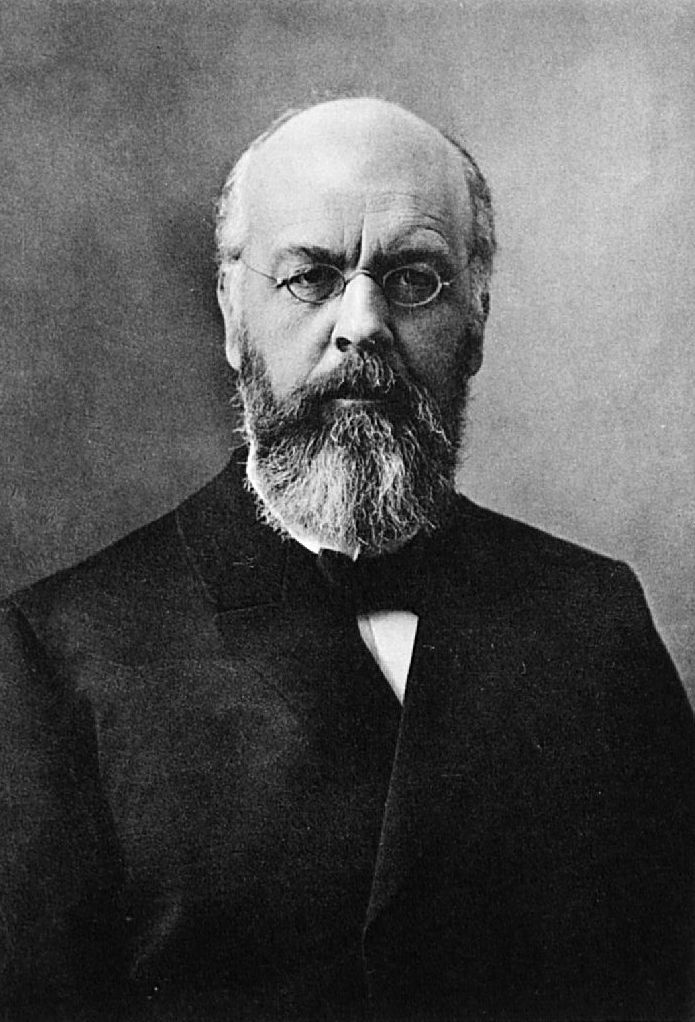
Emil Schürer.

Emil Schürer (2 May 1844 – 20 April 1910) was a German Protestant theologian known mainly for his study of the history of the Jews around the time of Jesus' ministry.

== Biography ==
Schürer was born in Augsburg. After studying at the universities of Erlangen, Berlin and Heidelberg from 1862 to 1866, he became in 1873 professor extraordinarius at Leipzig. Later on, he served as professor ordinarius at the universities of Giessen (from 1878), Kiel (from 1890) and Göttingen (from 1895 to 1910). In 1876 he founded and edited the Theologische Literaturzeitung, which he edited with Adolf von Harnack from 1881 to 1910. He died after a long illness in 1910 in Göttingen.

== Works ==
His elaborate work on the history of the Jews in the time of Christ, Geschichte des jüdischen Volkes im Zeitalter Jesu Christi (1886–1890; 4th edition 1901–1909), made him one of the best known of modern German scholars in Great Britain and the United States. The second edition was translated into English under the title A History of the Jewish People in the Time of Jesus Christ (1885–1891). Later, a revised English version of the work was created under the editorship of Géza Vermes, Fergus Millar and Matthew Black, with the slightly different title of The History of the Jewish People in the Age of Jesus Christ (1973–1987). In its earliest form, this work appeared as Lehrbuch der neutestamentlichen Zeitgeschichte (1874).

His other works include:

- Schleiermachers Religionsbegriff und die philosophischen Voraussetzungen desselben (1868) – Friedrich Schleiermacher's concept of religion and its philosophical presuppositions.
- Die Gemeindeverfassung der Juden in Rom in der Kaiserzeit (1879) – The community rule of the Jews in Rome during the Imperial period.
