= Tabal (region) =

Iron Age region in Asia Minor

𒆳𒋫𒁄 (Tabal) 𔒂𔖱𔔆 (Sura)
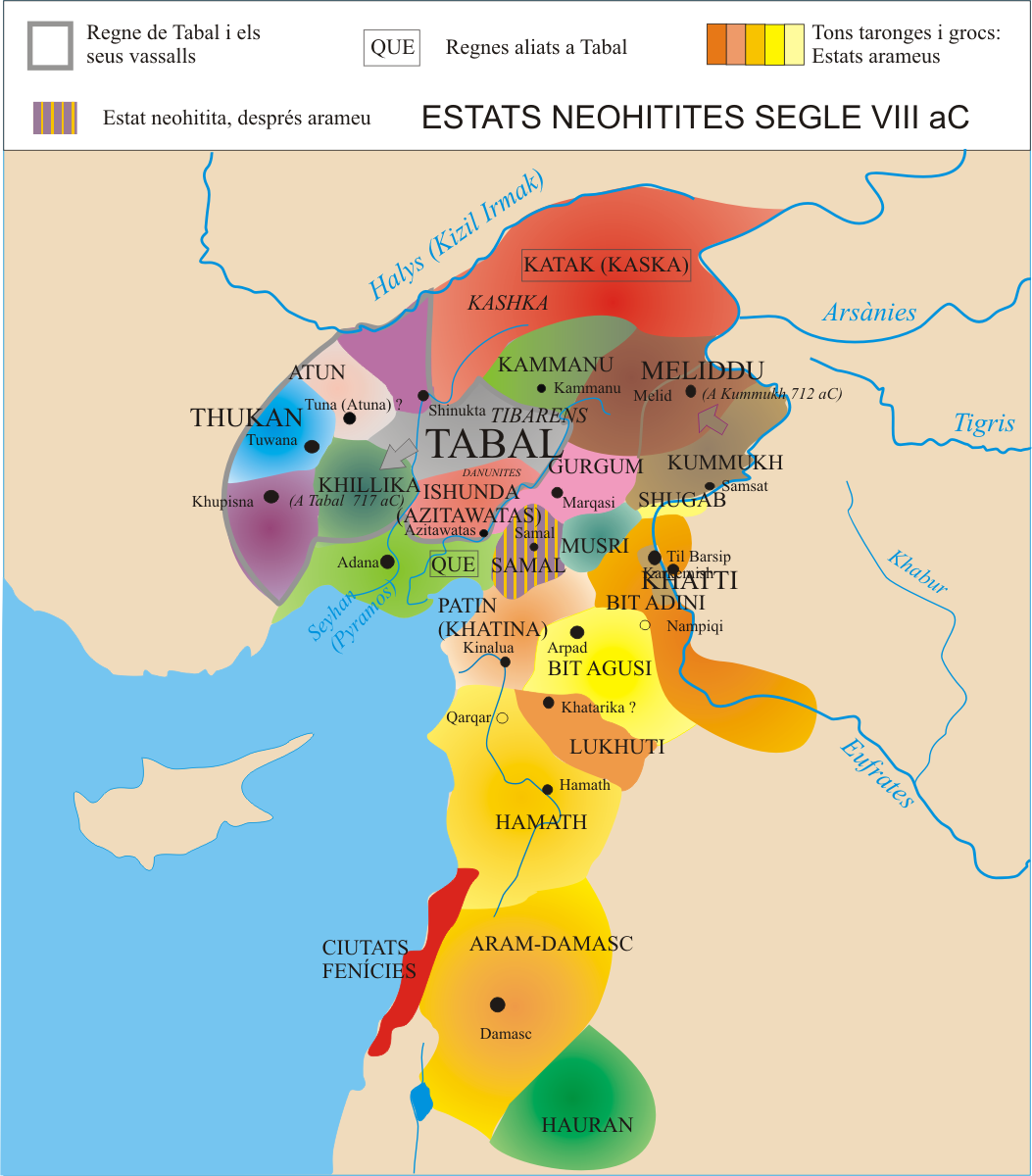

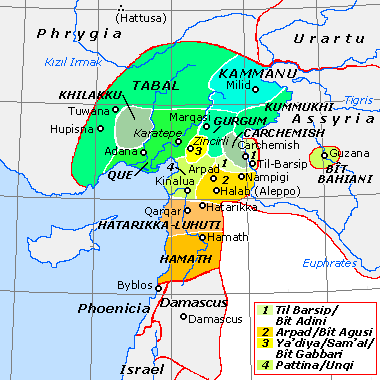
- Status: Region
- Official languages: Luwian
- Ethnic groups: Luwians
- Historical era: Iron Age
  - Late Bronze Age collapse: c. 12th century BCE
  - Tabalian campaign of Shalmaneser III: 837 BCE
  - Submission to the Neo-Assyrian Empire: mid-8th century BC
  - Cimmerian invasions: c. 7th century BCE
Preceded by	Succeeded by
Lower Land	Cappadocia
- Today part of: Turkey

Tabal (Neo-Assyrian Akkadian: 𒆳𒋫𒁄, romanized: Tabal) was a region which covered south-east Anatolia during the Iron Age.

== Name ==
=== Sura ===
The native name of the region of Tabal is still unknown, although it might have been Sura (Hieroglyphic Luwian: 𔒂𔖱𔔆), which is attested in inscriptions from Karkamiš. However, in the absence of native Tabalian inscriptions containing this name, this identification cannot yet be confirmed.

The origin of the name Sura is also uncertain since it was not used for the Tabalian region in the Late Bronze Age.

=== Tabal ===
==== As exonym ====
Due to the absence of the name Tabal or any other name similar to it in native Central Anatolian sources of the Iron Age and the lack of its attestation to designate this area in Old and Middle Assyrian sources, this name tends to be considered by historians to have been an exonym given to the region by the Neo-Assyrian Empire.

Tabal was likely an Akkadian term meaning "bank" or "shore" of a body of water, in reference to the kingdom and region of Tabal being on the southern bank of the Halys river, and was a tāprasu-construct of the Akkadian verb abālu (𒀀𒁀𒇻), meaning lit. 'dry out'. The name Tabal appears to have been a widely used one, since a location sharing this name is recorded from southern Syria, and the toponym Dabal or Tabal is recorded during the period of the Akkadian Empire in the 3rd millennium BCE.

Due to this region being divided into several city states with fluid borders, the name Tabal was a regional label rather than a political one.

The name Tabal as designation for Central Anatolia is attested in the orthographies:

- Tabali:
  - 𒆳𒋫𒁀𒇷,
  - 𒆳𒋫𒁀𒀀𒇷,
  - 𒆳𒋫𒁄𒇷,
  - 𒆳𒋰𒀀𒇷;
- Tabalum: 𒆳𒋫𒁀𒈝;
- Tabalu:
  - 𒆳𒋫𒁀𒇻,
  - 𒌷𒋰𒌷,
  - 𒆳𒋰𒌷;
- Tabala:
  - 𒆳𒋫𒁄𒆷,
  - 𒆳𒋰𒀀𒆷;
- and Tabal:
  - 𒆳𒋫𒁄,
  - 𒌷𒋫𒁄.

The form Tabali might have been the genitive of an original form Tabalu or Tabala or an absolute form of the toponym Tabali.

The adjectival form of the name was Tabalāya (𒆳𒋫𒁀𒆷𒀀𒀀, 𒆳𒋫𒁄𒀀𒀀, and 𒆳𒋫𒁄𒇴𒀀𒀀).

===== Hurrian etymology hypothesis =====
An explanation of the name of Tabal as meaning lit. 'Land of the Smith', derived from the Hurrian root tab- or taw-, meaning lit. 'casting metal, fuse, melt, merge', and the professional noun-forming suffix -li has also been suggested. However, the proposed origin of the term, the Hurrian form taballi=š (𒋫𒁄𒇷𒅖) attested in the Song of Release, is neither absolute nor adjectival or genitive, while "smith" in Hurrian would take the form tabli.

Moreover, Hurrian toponyms were formed by the addition of a genitive suffix =ve, meaning lit. 'town', so that "Land of the Smith" in Hurrian would be tab(a)l(i)=le=ve.

Additionally, the name Tabal first came into use in the 9th century BCE, by which time the Hurrian language had already become extinct.

==== As endonym ====
Alternatively, the name of Tabal might have been of native Anatolian Luwian origin, and been related to the name of the Lydian town Tabala (Ancient Greek: Τάβαλα, romanized: Tábala) and the Hittite mountain name Tapāla (𒄯𒊕𒋫𒉺𒆷). The obscurity of the etymology of Tabala and the still unknown location of Mount Tapāla however make this proposed etymology very uncertain.

==== Usage ====
The Neo-Assyrian Empire used the name of Tabal in a broad sense to refer both to the region located between the Halys river, the Taurus Mountains, the Konya-Karaman Plain, and the Anti-Taurus Mountains and to all the petty states located in this region collectively, as well as in a narrower sense to designate a specific kingdom within this region which in the 8th century was ruled by the king Wasusarmas. The name Tabal was itself initially used to designate the broader region during the reign of the Neo-Assyrian king Shalmaneser III before being later used for a specific kingdom within this region.

Modern scholarship therefore designates the kingdom of Tabal as "Tabal proper" to distinguish it from the broader region of Tabal.

===== In ancient sources =====
The Neo-Assyrian exonym Tabal was used to describe a region which was politically divided into multiple petty states:

- In the time of Shalmaneser III, Neo-Assyrian sources defined Tabal as a geographical territory in Central Anatolia to the west of Melid, and located between it and Ḫiyawa. These sources distinguished Tabal from Ḫatti, which they used to designate the northern regions of Syria situated along the Euphrates river.
- Similarly, Neo-Assyrian records from the reign of Sargon II again defined Tabal as a region of Central Anatolia where were located several unruly petty states, although this later conceptualisation of Tabal differed from that of Shalmaneser III's period by linking Tabal to Muški but not to Melid.

Neo-Assyrian sources differentiated Tabal from Ḫatti, with this latter name being used to refer to the part of northern Syria adjacent to the Euphrates river during the Iron Age, although Urartian sources from c. 780 BCE nonetheless referred to both Melid and Tabal as the "Hittite lands" (Ḫati=na=ṣi=e, 𒆳𒄩𒋾𒄿𒈾𒀀𒍢𒂊).

== Geography ==
=== Location ===
The region of Tabal was located in the eastern and southeastern part of the Central Anatolian Plateau corresponding partially to the Classical region of Cappadocia and the present-day Turkish provinces of Nevşehir and Niğde, and covered the area ranging from the southern limits of Phrygia in the north to the Taurus Mountains in the south, and from the Konya Plain and the southern curve of the Halys river in the west to the Anti-Taurus Mountains in the east. Politically, the Tabalian region was bounded in the west by Phrygia, the east by Til-Garimmu, Melid and Urartu, and in the south by Ḫilakku and Ḫiyawa.

In the north, the Tabalian region might have possibly extended to the north of the Halys river, in the region which had constituted the core territory of the Hittites in the Bronze Age up to the site corresponding to present-day Alişar Hüyük, and possibly including all the territory to the east of the Halys and to the south of the Pontic Mountains. To the south, the Tabalian region also dominated the approaches of the Cilician Gates and the eastern routes into the Anatolian Plateau.

Meanwhile, the Tabalian region covered the Konya Plain to the west.

=== Landscape ===
The Central Anatolian Plateau where Tabal was located was divided into basins or plains and highland pastures that constituted an ideal setting for practising seasonal pastoralism. This terrain was itself divided by mountain ridges created by tectonic folds, which in turn caused territorial divisions. This part of Anatolia was isolated, and its terrain was rugged.

Two mountains of Tabal are mentioned in Neo-Assyrian records, Mulî, which possessed significant silver deposits, and Tunni, which contained large alabaster deposits, were located in the northeastern end of the Bolkar and Taurus Mountains, where are presently located the silver mines of Bulgarmaden and the gypsum mine at Porsuk-Zeyve Höyük.

Mount Mulî was likely identical with the Mount Mudi mentioned in an inscription of a petty king named Tarḫunazzas recording that his overlord, the king Warpalawas II of Tuwana, had granted him Mount Mudi in gratitude for his service. The name Mulî was the Akkadian form of a Luwian original name Mudi which had experienced the Luwian sound shift from /d/ to /l/.

=== Neighbours ===
The neighbours of the Tabalian region were the Muški in the west across the Halys, and the Kaška in the north-east.

== History ==
The primary sources of information on the polities of the Tabalian region are:

- Neo-Assyrian texts such as royal annals, tribute lists and correspondence;
- a smaller number of Hieroglyphic Luwian inscriptions from the Tabalian region itself.

The limited material evidence from the Tabalian region has however made it difficult to understand its political extent, organisation and sphere of influence.

=== Bronze Age ===
During the Late Bronze Age, the territory which would later become known as Tabal was part of the region called the Lower Land by Hittite texts, with the Iron Age Tabal covering much of the territory of the Bronze Age Lower Land. The Lower Land had been incorporated into the Hittite Empire at an early date, and it had served as a southwestern buffer zone for the core Hittite territory.

The Tabalian region appears to not have been drastically impacted by the Late Bronze Age Collapse or the fall of the Hittite Empire, and there was no significant population movement in this period.

=== Iron Age ===
The earliest kingdoms in the region of Tabal might have formed in the period immediately following the collapse of the Hittite Empire during the Bronze Age Collapse, by which time it covered most of the territory of the former Hittite Lower Land. Although archaeological evidence for the region of Tabal is very small in number during this post-Bronze Age Collapse period, there appears to have been significant continuity between its population during the Bronze Age and the succeeding Iron Age.

==== Early development ====
Earlier hypotheses on the development of the Tabalian region proposed that it was constituted of "lesser developed" polities which had undergone formation through processes of secondary state formation and wealth generation by interacting with more advanced states. This led to viewing the Tabalian region as a "contested periphery," that is a peripheral area caught between great powers which in consequence underwent development by navigating the rivalries of their more powerful neighbours.

Archaeological analysis of the region has however provided evidence that developments were underway throughout post-Hittite societies during the "dark period" following the Bronze Age Collapse through which a new political structure was established. This new framework used traditional devices of power and representation from the Hittite Empire, such as the use of hieroglyphic script and the conspicuous incorporation of monumental art in palaces, elite residences, and city gates.

This period was characterised by the emergence new cultural traditions arising from limited but influential migrations, the evolution of local settlement structures and distribution and of local funerary practices, food production and consumption, textile production, and other forms of community behaviours. Thus, contrary to claims that the Neo-Hittite states owed their development to the Neo-Assyrian Empire, they were instead already economically prospering in their own right.

==== Tabalian campaign of Shalmaneser III ====
With the resurgence of Assyria in the form of the Neo-Assyrian Empire during the early 9th century BCE, the Neo-Assyrian king Ashurnasirpal II attempted to recover former Assyrian-held territories in Syria and the north, and an alliance of Aramaean and Luwian states had opposed its expansion into Syria. One of those states' kings, Katiyas of Ḫiyawa, attempted to expand his territory at the expense of that of the kingdom of Samʾal, whose king Kilamuwa submitted to Ashurnasirpal II's successor Shalmaneser III (r. 859 – 824 BCE) and appealed to him for protection, which provided Shalmaneser III with the opportunity to start campaigning in Anatolia, including in the Tabalian region, soon after the anti-Assyrian coalition disintegrated in the c. 840s BCE.

During this time, the eastern and southern borders of the Neo-Assyrian Empire were relatively secure, with Nairi having been pacified, Babylonia not constituting a threat, and Elam still weakened. This provided Shalmaneser III with a safe situation during which he could campaign further westwards than before without it threatening his empire. Thus, Shalmaneser III was able to consolidate his father's conquests before acting against the frontier states such as Ḫiyawa, Melid and the Tabalian region.

Since the Tabalian region was less wealthy than the regions of Syria and Palestine from which Shalmaneser III had already obtained rich tribute - although Shalmaneser III might have been attracted to Anatolia by natural resources like alabaster, silver and wood - , and these distant lands which were too far for him to impose any authority upon, the goal of Shalmaneser III's campaign in these regions which Neo-Assyrian armies had never previously invaded was likely to bolster his image as a warrior within his own empire. And the Tabalian region itself was then divided into several small states which were incapable of resisting to Neo-Assyrian advances. Furthermore, Anatolia was of interest to Shalmaneser III because of the need to obtain intelligence and test whether any risks to his borders came from there: to secure the territories recently recaptured by the Neo-Assyrian Empire, Shalmaneser III needed to end threats from nearby regions through diplomacy and military intimidation and create a buffer zone which would be subject to the Neo-Assyrian Empire without being under its direct rule.

It was in this context that the Tabalian region was first mentioned, in the records of Shalmaneser III's campaign to this area in 837 BCE, when the Neo-Assyrian forces entered it to make a show of force, extract goods, and stabilise Neo-Assyrian rule in Syrian by intimidating lands beyond it. Shalmaneser III's records attested of the existence of 24 kings ruling in the Tabalian region during this period.

During this campaign, Shalmaneser III entered the Tabalian region through Melid and attacked the kingdom of Tabal proper, then ruled by Tuwattis I, forcing him and his son Kikki to flee to their capital of Artulu, which the Neo-Assyrian army proceeded to besiege until Kikki submitted to Shalmaneser III, after which the other kings of the Tabalian region, numbering 24, also became tributaries of Shalmaneser III without fighting. This followed a clear strategy of entering the Tabalian region, attacking it and bullying it into submission as an example for the region's other polities, leaving the petty-rulers of the Tabalian region incapable of mobilising effectively and daunted by Neo-Assyrian military might and therefore with no choice but to pay tribute to Shalmaneser III.

After the submission of the northern kingdoms of the Tabalian region, Shalmaneser III marched to the south, where he climbed the mounts Tunni and Mulî in the area of the Taurus and Bolkar Mountains, from where he extracted silver and alabaster, before erecting statues of himself on these ranges. According to Shalmaneser III's throne base from Kalḫu, this throne was made from alabaster from Mount Tunni.

Shalmaneser III then marched into the territory of Ḫubišna, whose king Puḫame had not yet submitted to him. Puḫame became a tributary of Shalmaneser III without resistance, after which he left the Tabalian region and crossed the Cilician Gates to launch his first attack on Ḫiyawa. Thus, Shalmaneser III's campaign in Anatolia proved to be successful, resulting in the submission of much of the Tabalian region from the southern bend of the Halys up to Ḫubišna, and in the subduing of the southeastern Mediterranean coast of Anatolia thanks to his victory on Ḫiyawa, although the kingdom of Ḫilakku further westward and the Tabalian kingdom of Tuwana had remained safe from the Neo-Assyrian threat.

Unlike Ḫiyawa, where a Neo-Assyrian presence remained after Shalmaneser III's campaign, there is no evidence that the Tabalian region was reduced into clienthood to the Neo-Assyrian Empire.

==== Melidian campaign of Shalmaneser III ====
After Shalmaneser III had conquered the fortress of Uetaš during his campaign in Melid in 836 BCE, The kings of the Tabalian region offered tribute to him again to prevent further Neo-Assyrian attacks against them. However, the Tabalian region remained safe from any further Neo-Assyrian activities after the end of Shalmaneser's campaign and would remain so until the ascension of Tiglath-pileser III to the Neo-Assyrian kingship in the middle of the 8th century BCE.

Like the name Ḫatti, which referred to the part of northern Syria adjacent to the Euphrates river during the Iron Age, Tabal in the time of Shalmaneser III therefore designated a region, with Tabal being located between Melid and Ḫiyawa, and the title of "king of Tabal" used in Neo-Assyrian sources to designate the rulers of some of the states in this territory did not mean that they held dominance over the other kingdoms of this area.

===== Submission to Urartu =====
With the Neo-Assyrian Empire experiencing political instability at the end of Shalmaneser III's reign marking the beginning of a period of civil disharmony and political weakness, its rival power, Urartu, was able to intensify its own consolidation and expansion. In this context, the Urartian king Menua (r. c. 810 – c. 786 BCE) expanded to the west, where he claimed tribute from Melid and campaigned in the Ḫatti Lands, after which Menua's successor Argišti I (r. c. 786 – c. 765 BCE) continued his military policy by marching through Melid and into the Tabalian region, from which he demanded tribute. Like the Neo-Assyrian Shalmaneser had done before him, Argišti I campaigned west into the peripheral territories beyond his borders to obtain valuable resources as well as improve his territorial defence, which he improved by building a network of fortresses in Urartu itself.

Therefore, around c. 780 BC, Tabal had submitted to Argišti I and paid tribute to him. Argišti I's annals recording this event referred to Tabal as 𒁹𒌓𒀀𒋼𒄭𒉌𒄿, which has been variously interpreted as meaning:

- "land of the sons (descendants) of Tuate (Tuwattis)" (Tuate=ḫi=i=ni=ø ebani=ni=ø);
- or "land belonging to Tuate (Tuwattis)" (Tuate=ḫini=i ebani=ni=ø);
- or "the one of Tuate, the land."

This mention of Tabal in the Urartian records suggests that it held some importance in Central Anatolia.

==== Late 9th century and early 8th century BCE ====
Around c. 800 BCE, one or more Tabalian king(s) participated in a coalition led by the king Bar-Hadad II of Damascus which besieged the city of Ḫaḏarik in the kingdom of Ḥamat. Nevertheless, while the states of the Syrian region were still forming coalitions to resist the expansion of the Neo-Assyrian Empire during this period, the Tabalian region to the north of the Taurus Mountains remained politically divided into several small states and did not participate in any such endeavours.

By the middle of the 8th century BCE, the kingdoms of the Tabalian region had already renounced Neo-Assyrian suzerainty for a long time, which made this area an attractive target for the newly formed kingdom of Urartu to try to expand its influence there. However, a potential rival power was also then emerging in Central Anatolia in the form of the kingdom of Phrygia.

Over the course of the succeeding century, these small states had significantly increased in wealth and urbanisation that it caused competitions for resources among them. These changes included the development of fortified lower towns, the increase in size of Tabalian settlements, and increase in the diversity of provenance of ceramic wares. This process of development of these petty states led them to coalesce into larger kingdoms so that Neo-Assyrian records of the 8th century BCE listed five principal polities in the Tabalian region:

- the kingdom of Tabal proper (Luwian name unknown; later reorganised as Bīt-Burutaš), was one of the main Tabalian polities recognised by the Neo-Assyrian Empire,
- Tuwana, was the second main Tabalian polity recognised by the Neo-Assyrian Empire,
- three more states of less clear situation competed for power and independence:
  - Atuna,
  - Ištuanda,
  - and Ḫubišna.

Additionally, a sixth state, named Šinuḫtu, is also attested.

Of these states, Tabal proper and Tuwana were large polities, while Atuna, Ištuanda, Šinuḫtu and Ḫubišna were smaller city-states located on their peripheries.

Further west, in the Konya plain, was located another Tabalian kingdom which, in the 8th century BCE was ruled by a king named Ḫartapus.

==== Submission to the Neo-Assyrian Empire ====
By this time, the Tabalian states were thriving economies whose prosperity and wealth in natural resources attracted big powers such as Phrygia, Urartu, and the Neo-Assyrian Empire, the latter of which subsequently tried to control the rulers of the Tabalian region through vassalage treaties and demands of tribute.

By the time that Tiglath-pileser III (r. 745 – 727 BCE)Tiglath-pileser III had become the king of the Neo-Assyrian Empire, Urartu had grown into an important rival power which was competing for Neo-Assyrian client states in north Syria and was also expanding southwards towards the core Assyrian territory. To prevent Urartu from gaining access to its western borderlands, the Neo-Assyrian Empire had to impose its rule over crucial Anatolian regions like the Tabalian region, while Urartu saw Neo-Assyrian expansion there negatively for similar reasons. This turned the Tabalian region into a focal point of escalating competition between states: neither the Neo-Assyrian Empire nor Urartu was able to conquer and permanently annex the distant Tabalian region, resulting in their only applicable policy there consisting of a mix of diplomacy and limited military intervention.

Tiglath-pileser III's defeat of an alliance led by Urartu which included Melid but not Tabal in 743 BCE and conquering Arpad in 740 BCE allowed him to undo Urartian gains in Syria. Consequently, he extended Neo-Assyrian territory and influence by taking over the lands which he could directly control, such as Arpad, Ulluba and Damascus, and imposing vassaldom on the lands which he could not directly control, such as Samʾal, Melid and Judah. As a result of Tiglath-pileser III's successes, multiple neutral states, including the Tabalian polities, submitted and paid tribute to him with the hope of avoiding conflicts with the Neo-Assyrian Empire.

Therefore, in c. 738 BCE the five kingdoms of the Tabalian region had become tributaries of Tiglath-pileser III, possibly after his conquest of Arpad over the course of 743 to 740 BCE caused the states of the Tabalian region to submit to him, or as a result of a campaign of Tiglath-pileser III in the Tabalian region itself. Henceforth, the two main states of the Tabalian region, that is Tuwana and Tabal proper, became targets of Neo-Assyrian imperialism, as well as local powers who controlled an area of strategic and economic importance between the Neo-Assyrian Empire and Phrygia.

Thus, Tiglath-pileser III had been able to outmanoeuvre Urartu by reducing the Tabalian region into a Neo-Assyrian client, thus causing Urartu to lose its advantage and stop being of any importance in this region of Anatolia.

==== Hegemony of Tabal proper ====
During the 8th century BCE, the first datable Luwian inscriptions and monuments from the Tabalian region appear, showing the advantages which this area obtained from being a client of the Neo-Assyrian Empire, with the oldest inscriptions being from the reign of the king of Tabal proper, Tuwattis II, around c. 750 BCE.

In the mid-8th century BCE, the kingdom of Tabal proper was ruled by Tuwattis II's son, Wasusarmas, who regarded himself as the regional hegemon of the Tabalian region, and who had been the first Luwian king to have claimed the prestigious imperial Hittite titles of "Great King" (Hieroglyphic Luwian: 𔐒, romanized: uras ḫantawattis) and "Hero" (Hieroglyphic Luwian: 𔐕𔔹𔗔, romanized: ḫastallis), which, along with the revival of this title by the possibly contemporary king Ḫartapus who ruled a state further to the west, was the first time that a Luwian ruler had adopted these imperial Hittite titles after the end of their use by the rulers of Karkamiš in the 10th century BCE.

Wasusarmas's use of these titles for himself and his father appears to have been significant enough that the various rulers of the Tabalian region either identified or rejected it, and some other Tabalian rulers, such as Warpalawas II of Tuwana and Kiyakiyas of Šinuḫtu, might possibly have been his vassals.

Wasusarmas's expansionist ventures brought him into conflict with a coalition of eight enemy rulers led by the king of Phrygia or by the king Ḫartapus in the Konya-Karaman Plains. Wasusarmas claimed to have defeated this enemy coalition with the help of the kings Warpalawas II of Tuwana, Kiyakiyas of Šinuḫtu, and the otherwise unknown king Ruwandas, which allowed him to expand his borders to the west.

Thus, during the 8th century BCE, the more successful Tabalian rulers such as Hartapus, Warpalawas II, and Wasusarmas, were engaging in expansionism.

The Tabalian ruling elite was rich and powerful enough to invest in vainglorious monuments at the very time that it started paying tribute to the Neo-Assyrian Empire, suggesting that external patronage was what made this political and cultural flourishing possible. This client-patron relationship included benefits to the client, and while the payment of tribute would have been a burden on the local population which would have caused resentment and even unrest, it concentrated more power among the local elites: from the perspective of the imperial power, prudent extraction of tribute and other obligations would not ruin the client-states or allow them to become too strong to control; the maintenance of client-states was done to stabilise and develop territories without directly ruling them, making it counterproductive to overburden them. Thus, the Tabalian elites remained prosperous under the rule of Tiglath-pileser III.

Despite being a Neo-Assyrian tributary, Wasusarmas continued using the titles of "Great King" and "Hero," leading to Tiglath-pileser III accusing him of acting as his equal and then deposing him and replacing him with a commoner named Ḫullî. Due to internal Tabalian disunity and fear of Neo-Assyrian retaliation, other Tabalian kings made no attempt to help Wasusarmas, whose fate is unknown. This deposition of Wasusarmas resulted in a power vacuum in the Tabalian region, while no subsequent ruler from the Tabalian region claimed the title of "Great King" again after him.

The deposition of Wasusarmas and his replacement by Ḫullî appears to not have solved the problems which Neo-Assyrian power was facing in the Tabalian region, and Neo-Assyrian policy in the Tabalian region throughout the 8th century BCE would continue being characterised by an inability to find any compatible partners there, as attested by how Tiglath-pileser III's son and successor, Shalmaneser V (r. 727 – 722 BCE), later deported Ḫullî and his family to Assyria, possibly because they had conspired with Phrygia.

==== Between Assyria and Phrygia ====
Following the union of the Phrygians and the Muški under the Phrygian king Midas, this latter king was able to extend his kingdom to the east across the Halys river into the former core territory of the Hittite Empire and build a large empire in Anatolia which reached the Aegean Sea in the west and the environs of the Euphrates and borders of the Tabalian region in the east and south. The eastward expansionist ventures of Midas in the east soon led to his fledgling Phrygian empire becoming a major rival to Neo-Assyrian power in eastern Anatolia, especially when Midas initiated contacts with Neo-Assyrian vassals, causing the Tabalian region to become contested between the Neo-Assyrian and Phrygian empires.

Since the Tabalian region was a subject of the Neo-Assyrian Empire, this Phrygian expansion increased the possibility of war between the two rival empires. Thus, the Tabalian region found itself wedged between the Neo-Assyrian and Phrygian empires, both of whom saw it as a strategically useful buffer zone to contain the other's expansionist ambitions.

Additionally, Urartu was resurgent, and together with Phrygia formed a serious threat to the northern borders of the Neo-Assyrian Empire. The Neo-Assyrian Empire therefore considered it important to prevent an alliance between Phrygia and Urartu, while Phrygia and Urartu themselves saw Neo-Assyrian presence in Anatolia as dangerous and worked against the Neo-Assyrian interests there. Meanwhile, by maintaining control of Tabal, Melid and Ḫiyawa, the Neo-Assyrian Empire could prevent easy communications between Phrygia and Urartu and frustrate their attempts to subvert the Neo-Assyrian clients in Syria. Consequently, while the Tabalian region was nominally under Neo-Assyrian control, it experienced pressure from the Neo-Assyrian Empire, Phrygia and Urartu during the rule of the Neo-Assyrian king Sargon II (r. 722 – 705 BCE).

Thus, Midas tried to persuade the still independent local rulers of the Tabalian region to switch their allegiances to Phrygia: the loyalty of the Tabalian kings to the Neo-Assyrian Empire was unsteady, and those among them who were diplomatically approached by Midas might have preferred renouncing their allegiance to the Neo-Assyrian Empire and instead allying with Midas.

With alternatives to Neo-Assyrian suzerainty available, the Tabalian rulers now had a choice and could support the power which provided them with the best chances of success of the biggest rewards for loyalty. This situation made political power difficult for the Tabalian rulers to maintain, with the Neo-Assyrian Empire forbidding contact between its vassals and its enemies, though the Tabalian kings were forced to entertain Urartian or Phrygian diplomatic overtures: if they refused, the Phrygians or Urartians could approach or even create rival political factions.

Thus, the enemies of the Neo-Assyrian Empire were in a favourable position, since they were easily able to pull Tabalian kings away from the Neo-Assyrian Empire or at the very least make the situation difficult for them. This, in turn, forced the Neo-Assyrian Empire to become more and more involved in the Tabalian region, which it still sought to indirectly control, while the Tabalian kings had to be political skilled enough to handle the threats from multiple external and internal sources, because the presence of multiple foreign powers which, during this time, tried to control Tabal escalated the competition both within and between the Tabalian states.

Thus, the kings of the Tabalian region found themselves having to choose whether aligning themselves with the Neo-Assyrian or the Phrygian empire was in their interests, and several of them did accept Midas's offer, with Kiyakiyas of Šinuḫtu withholding his tribute to the Neo-Assyrian Empire, possibly after Midas had incited him to do so.

Sargon II felt that Neo-Assyrian interests in Anatolia were threatened by the prospect of his vassals there switching their allegiance to Phrygia, or even renouncing Neo-Assyrian suzerainty if they expected Phrygia to support them should he attempt to restore his authority over them. Sargon II also feared that inaction against a rebel vassal king, especially one who had moved closer to Phrygia, would cause other vassal kings to also break free of Neo-Assyrian rule.

More southwards, the king Piyassilis of Karkamiš had communicated with Midas in secret, likely with the goal of forming an alliance with Phrygia. Karkamiš was itself an important location for the Neo-Assyrian Empire since its location on the west bank of the Euphrates was critical in maintaining Neo-Assyrian authority over its western subject territories, so that Karkamiš potentially allying with or submitting to Phrygia would have allowed Midas to expand its power over the Neo-Assyrian vassals to the west of the Euphrates.

In addition to the wavering loyalty of the Tabalian kings, the possibility of an alliance between Midas and Rusa I of Urartu further threatened Neo-Assyrian power not only in southeastern Anatolia, but also throughout all of eastern Anatolia and in northern Mesopotamia.

Therefore, Sargon II reacted in 718 BCE through cautionary action meant to deter the other Tabalian kingdoms from rebelling by invading Šinuḫtu and deporting Kiyakiyas, his family and warriors, and 7350 inhabitants of the kingdom's capital city to Assyria, where Kiyakiyas himself was executed by being burnt alive, while the kingdom of Šinuḫtu was abolished and its lands were handed over to Atuna, then ruled by the king Kurtî.

The transfer of the lands of Šinuḫtu to Kurtî appears to also have resulted in the incorporation into his kingdom of the territories once ruled by Wasusarmas of Tabal proper in the northwestern part of his kingdom corresponding to the region of present-day Suvasa, Topada and Göstesin. Compacted with the removal of the removal of Wasusarmas himself and of his ally Kiyakiyas, this benefited Kurtî's kingdom of Atuna and stimulated the growth of his power.

To counter the threat of the rising power of Phrygia, Sargon II tried to establish a centralised authority under a ruler whom he could trust in the Tabalian region, and, possibly in 718 BCE itself during the campaign against Šinuḫtu, he therefore reorganised the kingdom of Tabal proper into the state of Bīt-Burutaš, significantly enlarged with the addition of Ḫilakku into it, under the rule of the son of Ḫullî, the king Ambaris, to whom he had married his daughter Aḫat-abiša.

The distribution of lands by Sargon II among his vassals in the Tabalian region was done according to a "divide and conquer" strategy: by making Ambaris his son-in-law, Sargon II raised his status above those of the other Tabalian client kings, although the fact that the land of Ḫilakku given to him in dowry was close to Ḫiyawa but not to Bīt-Burutaš prevented Ambaris from having any territorial ambitions. Similar considerations lay behind Sargon II giving Šinuḫtu to Kurtî: Atuna and Šinuḫtu were located on either side of Tuwana, which kept Tuwana in check by flanking it with Atunaean territory. This was a deliberate policy of distributing power and lands among Tabalian kings to prevent any one of them from becoming too strong, which therefore allowed the Neo-Assyrian Empire to control the Tabalian region.

Nevertheless, the Tabalian region and Phrygia were frequently associated together in the Neo-Assyrian records, which referred to them as Tabal and Mušku, attesting that the Neo-Assyrian Empire perceived these two as being the dominant geopolitical forces of Central Anatolia.

Similarly, in 717 BCE Sargon II attacked the kingdom of Karkamiš, deported its king and his family and courtiers to Assyria, and annexed its territory, turning it into a province of the Neo-Assyrian Empire.

However, Midas continued pressuring the western Neo-Assyrian territories and intensified his efforts to persuade the local rulers of this region to renounce their vassalage to the Neo-Assyrian Empire, and he even launched attacks until as far south as the territories of Ḫiyawa.

And since Atuna abutted Phrygia in the north, it was one of the Tabalian kingdoms which were the most vulnerable to possible Phrygian attacks or to diplomatic offers from Phrygia, and the king Kurtî of Atuna himself came under pressure from Midas to renounce Neo-Assyrian suzerainty and accept that of Phrygia, likely under threat of a Phrygian attack if he refused. Therefore, Kurtî also soon rebelled against Neo-Assyrian rule and accepted the overlordship of Midas of Phrygia.

In addition to finding themselves pressured by Phrygia or Urartu, several of the western vassals of the Neo-Assyrian Empire might also have themselves initiated contacts with Phrygia and Urartu with the hope of freeing themselves from Neo-Assyrian suzerainty, thus leading to a series of anti-Assyrian uprisings by the Anatolian vassals of the Neo-Assyrian Empire during the rest of Sargon II's reign.

Ambaris himself came under pressure from Midas, who attempted to persuade him to renounce Neo-Assyrian allegiance and join him, initially through diplomatic means and later through military threats. Despite Sargon II having successfully attacked and defeated Urartu in 714 BCE, leading to the death of Rusa I, the new king who came to power in Urartu, Argišti II, continued the attempts to expand Urartian influence on the Neo-Assyrian vassals, especially those to the west of the Euphrates, on the Anatolian plateau and the south-east coast of Anatolia. Thus, both Phrygia and Urartu were trying to expand their power in these regions and challenge the sole supremacy of the Neo-Assyrian Empire there.

This situation left Ambaris with little choice but to accept an alliance with Phrygia and renounce his allegiance to the Neo-Assyrian Empire. Facing increased pressure from both Midas of Phrygia and Argišti II, Ambaris communicated with them seeking guarantees that they would protect him should he break his ties with the Neo-Assyrian Empire.

Neo-Assyrian intelligence however intercepted Ambaris's messages to Phrygia and Urartu, causing him to lose favour with Sargon II, who accused him of conspiring with these rival powers and consequently deported Ambaris, his family and his chief courtiers to Assyria in 713 BCE, after which a Neo-Assyrian governor was imposed on Bīt-Burutaš, Ḫilakku and Ḫiyawa by Sargon II, with the first of these being Aššur-šarru-uṣur, who possibly as early as 713 BCE was appointed as governor of Ḫiyawa and also held authority on Ḫilakku and the Tabalian region.

The Tabalian region was thus put under direct rule of the Neo-Assyrian Empire, which settled it with people from other newly conquered regions: with the imposition of Neo-Assyrian rule over Bīt-Burutaš and Ḫilakku, the Tabalian region might have experienced more intensified Assyrianisation.

With the Tabalian region being volatile due to the encroachment of Phrygia, and the kings Warpalawas II of Tuwana and Awarikus of Ḫiyawa being too elderly to efficiently maintain Neo-Assyrian authority in southeastern Anatolia despite having been loyal Neo-Assyrian vassals, Sargon II had therefore assimilated Bīt-Burutaš and Ḫilakku into the Neo-Assyrian provincial system and appointed over them a governor who also held authority over the kingdoms of Ḫiyawa and Tuwana so as to make sure that the whole region would be united under the rule of the Neo-Assyrian Empire.

The annexation of Bīt-Burutaš and the deportation of Ambaris was impactful enough that it was able to convince Kurtî of Atuna to submit back to Neo-Assyrian overlordship again, and he sent envoys to Sargon II in Media to re-pledge his allegiance and pay tribute to the Neo-Assyrian Empire. Sargon II pardoned Kurtî, likely because Neo-Assyrian power in the northwestern Tabalian region was too weak to enable any action against Kurtî.

The annexation of Tabal proper also left Tuwana as one of the last still independent Tabalian kingdoms, although it was coming under the pressure of both the Neo-Assyrian Empire and the kingdom of Phrygia because of its location between these two powers, with some Old Phrygian inscriptions on basalt, possibly dated from the reign of Warpalawas II of Tuwana, as well as the Phrygian robe depicted as worn by Warpalawas II in his İvriz monument, suggesting that aspects of Phrygian culture were arriving into Tuwana during the late 8th century BCE in the time of Warpalawas II.

Warpalawas II nevertheless appears to have carried out a policy of cooperation with the Neo-Assyrian Empire, thanks to which he was able to keep his throne until the c. 700s BCE. And, after Sargon II had annexed Bīt-Burutaš and deported Ambaris, he increased Tuwana's territory in the broader Tabalian region by giving him part of the territory of Bīt-Burutaš. Warpalawas and Tuwana however appear to have come under direct Neo-Assyrian rule after the annexation of Bīt-Burutaš, when Aššur-šarru-uṣur was also given authority over Ḫilakku and the broader Tabalian region.

Sargon II's fortification of the region around Kammanu and Til-Garimmu to defend it against Urartu, Phrygia and the Kaška however suggests that, by c. 711 BCE, the Neo-Assyrian Empire had lost control of the northern Tabalian region, which either came under Phrygian influence or was annexed by Phrygia: the extensive power of Phrygia in the Tabalian region is attested by how it was able to intercept an embassy from Ḫiyawa to Urartu.

Meanwhile, the power vacuum created in the Tabalian region by the removal of Wasusarmas and Kiyakiyas further intensified due to Sargon II's failure to put in place reliable vassals there and the consequent deportation of Ambaris: this power vacuum in turn led to the further growth of the power of the kingdom of Atuna. And, around c. 710 BCE, Atuna and Ištuanda launched a joint attack on the cities of Bīt-Burutaš held by Warpalawas, prompting Aššur-šarru-uṣur to worry whether he might defect from Neo-Assyrian overlordship. It is unknown whether Kurtî was still the king of Atuna by then.

Facing a volatile political situation in the Tabalian region, exemplified by the activities of Ambaris and the aggression by Atuna and Ištuanda, as well as threatened by the power of Phrygia, Urartu and the Cimmerians which threatened the western interests of the Neo-Assyrian Empire, Sargon II therefore responded by extending direct Neo-Assyrian control over the Tabalian region, and then by restoring Neo-Assyrian power there, deporting the rebellious Tabalian rulers to Assyria and giving their cities to rulers who had remained loyal to him, and deporting large portions of the Tabalian population while settling Assyrians and other foreigners there.

Sargon II was seeking to conclude an arrangement with Midas to avert the danger of a Phrygian alliance with Urartu, and after Aššur-šarru-uṣur managed to lead three successful expeditions in the kingdom of Midas in 710 BCE, the hostilities between the Neo-Assyrian and Phrygian empires soon came to an end by c. 709 BCE, thus averting the danger of war between the two powers. Another reason for Midas's appeasement of the Neo-Assyrian Empire might also have been an attempt by him to safeguard his kingdom against the Cimmerians, a nomadic Iranic people who had migrated into West Asia from the Eurasian Steppe, and who were starting to attack Phrygia.

The normalisation of relations between the Neo-Assyrian and Phrygian empires meanwhile gave Sargon II a solution to the failures of his strategies in Anatolia by providing him with the opportunity to consolidate Neo-Assyrian rule over Anatolia, and especially over the kingdoms of the Tabalian region. This is attested in a letter by Sargon II to Aššur-šarru-uṣur in which he described the Tabalian kings as having been made helpless thanks to the peace concluded between Phrygia and the Neo-Assyrian Empire, so that Aššur-šarru-uṣur would "press them from this side" and Midas would "press them from that side."

==== Renewed independence ====
𒆳𒋫𒁄 or 𒌷𒋫𒁄 (Tabal)
- c. 705 BCE–c. 7-6th centuries BCE
- Common languages: Luwian
- Religion: Luwian religion
- Government: Monarchy
- King
  - r. c. 675 BCE: Iškallû
  - r. c. 669 – c. 651 BCE: Mugallu
  - r. c. 651 – c. 640 BCE: Mussi
- Historical era: Iron Age
  - End of Neo-Assyrian rule in Anatolia: c. 705 BCE
  - Disestablished: c. 7-6th centuries BCE
Preceded by	Succeeded by
Neo-Assyrian Empire	Lydian Empire
- Today part of: Turkey

In 705 BCE, Sargon II campaigned against the Cimmerians in the Tabalian region but he died in battle against one Gurdî of Kulummu, ending Neo-Assyrian direct rule there, with the Tabalian region consequently becoming independent again, thus destabilising it and leaving it vulnerable to the attacks of the Cimmerians. Sargon II's death in battle and the loss of his corpse, which prevented him from being buried according to Assyrian royal customs, in turn led to an ideological crisis within the Neo-Assyrian Empire itself.

After this, the Neo-Assyrian Empire stopped intervening in Anatolia while direct presence of Neo-Assyrian officials and military in Central Anatolia ceased being attested, resulting in references to the Tabalian region in Neo-Assyrian sources becoming rarer and fewer in number as well as vaguer in terms of geographic detail due to this loss of control over the Central Anatolian territories to the west of the Anti-Taurus Mountains. However, the end of Neo-Assyrian hegemony on the Tabalian region meant the loss of foreign subsidies and foreign markets and a toll on the Tabalian elites from the overproduction needed to fulfill tribute quotas, resulting in an economic decline and consequently the end of Hieroglyphic Luwian inscriptions and monumental art in the Tabalian region.

Following Sargon II's death, the former Melidian city of Til-Garimmu, located on the border of the Tabalian region and which might have been identical with Kulummu, shook off Neo-Assyrian rule and declared its independence under Gurdî, whose kingdom which had the city of Urdutu as capital soon grew in power to encompass much of the Tabalian region.

The following year, in 704 BCE, Sargon II's son and successor, Sennacherib (r. 705 – 681 BCE), launched a punitive attack against Kulummu to avenge his father's death. This campaign, which was led by his 'magnates" rather than by him personally, appears to have failed, since it was not recorded in Sennacherib's official inscriptions.

Sennacherib launched another retaliatory campaign in the Tabalian border region a decade later, in 695 BCE, but, despite managing to destroy the city of Til-Garimmu itself and abducting its gods, he was again unsuccessful since he was not able to capture or punish Gurdî or reseize Til-Garimmu or enter the Tabalian region, leading to a worsening of the ideological crisis within the Neo-Assyrian Empire.

As part of his attempts to distance himself from his father, whose death was perceived in Assyria as the result of a transgression of his part, and because the region of Kulummu/Til-Garimmu had become considered by him as "tainted" due to it being where Sargon II had died, Sennacherib sent his generals to campaign there instead of personally leading these attacks.

Whether the Neo-Assyrian Empire mounted more attempts to reoccupy the Tabalian region is unknown due to the Neo-Assyrian practice of not documented failed military activities. However, the failure of Sargon II to incorporate the Tabalian region into the Neo-Assyrian Empire, followed by Sennacharib's unsuccessful campaigns there, ended all Neo-Assyrian attempts to expand beyond the Cilician Plain.

However, Neo-Assyrian activities in the region continued for a while, with Sennacherib's son and successor, the Neo-Assyrian king Esarhaddon (r. 681 – 669 BCE), having campaigned there against the Cimmerians from his base in Ḫiyawa (then reorganised as the province of Que) and Ḫilakku, resulting in the defeat and killing of the Cimmerian king Teušpā in Ḫubišna in 679 BCE. Esarhaddon appears to have reached Ḫubišna by passing through the Göksu river valley and bypassing the Anti-Taurus Mountains and Tabal proper.

Despite this victory, and although Esarhaddon had managed to stop the advance of Cimmerians in Que so it remained under Neo-Assyrian control, the military operations were not successful enough for the Assyrians to firmly occupy the areas around of Ḫubišna, nor were they able to secure the borders of the Neo-Assyrian Empire, leaving Que vulnerable to incursions from Tabal, Kuzzurak and Ḫilakku, who were allied to the western Cimmerians who were establishing themselves in Anatolia at this time. Thus, Esarhaddon was left remaining wary of possible attacks on Que by Ḫilakku or Tabal.

Nonetheless, these later Neo-Assyrian activities in Central Anatolia were limited only to its periphereal regions rather than its core territories, and information on the region after 705 BCE became lacking: Tabal after this date became mentioned only in sources on adjacent territories like Ḫilakku, Til-Garimmu and especially Melid.

Under the reign of Esarhaddon itself, a ruler named Iškallû gained control of the whole Tabalian region and allied with the king Mugallu of Melid, against whom Esarhaddon had unsuccessfully campaigned in 675 BCE, suggesting that Tabal had been reconstituted after the end of Neo-Assyrian rule over Anatolia. According to later Neo-Assyrian records, Mugallu himself had engaged in hostilities against Esarhaddon.

Thus, the absence of mentions of Tabal in the 7th century BCE was due to Neo-Assyrian disengagement from this region rather than any possible dissolution of this polity.

===== Cimmerian invasions =====
Some time around c. 675 BCE, the Cimmerians invaded and destroyed the Phrygian empire and sacked its capital of Gordion, due to which Midas committed suicide. The Cimmerians consequently settled in Phrygia and subdued part of the Phrygians so that they controlled a large area consisting of Phrygia from its western limits which bordered on Lydia to its eastern boundaries neighbouring the Neo-Assyrian Empire, after which they made the Tabalian region into their centre of operations.

Assyrian sources from around this same time therefore recorded a Cimmerian presence in the area of Tabal, and, between c. 672 and c. 669 BCE, an Assyrian oracular text recorded that the Cimmerians, together with the Phrygians and the Cilicians, were threatening the Neo-Assyrian Empire's newly conquered territory of Melid. The Cimmerians were thus active in Tabal, Ḫilakku and Phrygia in the 670s BCE, and, in alliance with these former two states, were attacking the western Neo-Assyrian provinces.

Thus, the Cimmerians became the masters of Anatolia, where they controlled a large territory bordering Lydia in the west, covering Phrygia, and reaching Cilicia and the borders of Urartu in the east. The core territories of the Cimmerians were in Central Anatolia between the Konya Plain and the Neo-Assyrian province of Que, but also extended to parts of the Konya Plain itself, including its western parts, and to Cappadocia, as well as to the west of Tabal, implying that some of the Neo-Hittite states in and near the Konya Plain had become subjected to the Cimmerians.

The disturbances experienced by the Neo-Assyrian Empire as result of the activities of the Cimmerians in Anatolia led to many of the rulers of this region to try to break away from Neo-Assyrian overlordship, with Ḫilakku having become an independent polity again under the king Sandašarme by the time that Esarhaddon had been succeeded as king of the Neo-Assyrian Empire by his son, Ashurbanipal (r. 669 – 631 BCE), so that by then the Cimmerians had effectively ended Neo-Assyrian control in Anatolia.

By the time that Ashurbanipal had succeeded Esarhaddon, Mugallu of Melid had defeated Iškallû and annexed Tabal, due to which Mugallu became referred to in Neo-Assyrian records as the king of Tabal, although it is unclear whether he was the sole ruler of Tabal or merely the only one among the Tabalian kings to be mentioned in Neo-Assyrian records. Under Mugallu, Tabal was able to maintain its independence from the Neo-Assyrian Empire, and formed a large polity reaching the region of present-day Kayseri in the west and Melid in the east, possibly even extending over the Anti-Taurus Mountains.

The defeat of the Cimmerians by the Lydian king Gyges between c. 665 to c. 660 BCE weakened their allies, Mugallu of Tabal and Sandašarme of Ḫilakku, enough that they were left with no choice but to submit to the authority of the Neo-Assyrian Empire in c. 662 BCE, after which Mugallu established diplomatic ties with the Neo-Assyrian Empire, and started paying an annual tribute of horses to it after sending an embassy and one of his daughters with a large dowry to Ashurbanipal. With Mugallu's submission, Tabal also became a useful buffer that protected the Neo-Assyrian Empire from attacks originating in Anatolia, and Mugallu was still paying tribute to Ashurbanipal in 651 BCE.

Although Mugallu's son and successor, Mussi, had initially continued his father's later policy of remaining a tribute-paying vassal of the Neo-Assyrian Empire, around c. 640 BCE he rebelled, stopped paying his tribute, and allied with the Cimmerian king Dugdammî, but he died the same year without any engaging in any fighting, while his family and his kingdom's elite submitted to the Neo-Assyrian Empire and became vassals of Ashurbanipal, and Dugdammî fled into the mountains. After this, the Tabalian region disappeared from ancient sources.

Dugdammî would raid the Neo-Assyrian Empire again in c. 640 BCE, but his camp caught fire and a revolt broke out against him, which forced him to submit to Ashurbanipal. Dugdammî soon broke his oath of allegiance to the Neo-Assyrian Empire and attacked it again, but he soon fell gravely ill and died in great pain.

After the death of Mussi, Tabal underwent a period of political decline which coincided with the contemporary decline of Phrygian power, as well as the expansion of the western Anatolian kingdom of Lydia further eastwards into Anatolia. The fortified hilltop town of Kerkenes near Alişar was established during this period.

Nevertheless, by the time that the Neo-Assyrian Empire had collapsed in the late 7th century BCE, the Tabalian region appears to have been the only place where post-Hittite states still existed, while those located in the other areas had already been annexed during the preceding century. Thus, the Tabalian region became one of the last regions where still persisted the Neo-Hittite monumental and scribal traditions originally established by the Hittite imperial dynasty in the 13th century BCE: some possible Tabalian monuments from the 7th century BCE possibly include those from Göllüdağ, the 2nd Niğde stele and the 2nd İvriz relief from the kingdom of Tuwana, the 3rd Kulu stele, a statue from İvriz, and a stele from Tavşantepe.

==== End ====
The fate of the Tabalian region is unclear, although it might possibly have been ultimately destroyed due to the Cimmerian invasions.

The development of the Tabalian region finally came to an end in the late 7th to early 6th centuries BCE as a result of the expansion of the Lydian followed by the Achaemenid Empire into this region. By the time of the Lydian conquest in the late 7th century BCE, the northern part of the Tabalian region enclosed between the bend of the Halys had become a Phrygian kingdom centred around Kerkenes.

By the time the Tabalian region reappeared in later ancient sources, it had become known by the name of Cappadocia, whose inhabitants were called Syrians (Σύροι, romanized: Súroi; Σύριοι, romanized: Súrioi) or Leucosyrians (Λευκόσυροι, romanized: Leukósuroi) by the ancient Greeks, with this name likely being a derivation of the Luwian name of Tabal, Sura (𔒂𔖱𔔆).

==== Legacy ====
===== In the Bible =====
Tabal is mentioned in the Hebrew Bible under the name of Tubāl (Hebrew: תֻּבָל), where the eponymous figure bearing this name is listed in the Table of Nations of the Book of Genesis as one of the seven sons of Japheth, along with Yāwān (Ionia), Madai (Media), Tīrās (possibly Thrace), Gomer (the Cimmerians), Māgōg, and Mešek (Phrygia/Muški), with their names all corresponding to locations or populations connected to Anatolia.

Tubāl is mentioned again, this time as a location, in the Book of Isaiah, along with Taršīš, Pūṭ (Libya), Lūd (Lydia), Mešek, Rōš and Yāwān, as the most distant places to which the Hebrew god Yahweh sent messengers of grace. In the Book of Ezekiel, Tubāl, Yāwān and Mešek are a group of countries who participate in trading bronzework and slaves with the Phoenician city of Tyre. In both of these attestations, Tubāl is linked to Anatolia.

The Book of Ezekiel mentions Tubāl four more times, with the last three of these depicting it as being ruled by Gōg of Māgōg, who has been tentatively been identified with the king Gyges of Lydia.

Tubāl always appears together with Mešek in the Old Testament, where they jointly refer to Anatolia. This association was derived from the Neo-Assyrian sources of the late 8th century BCE, when records from the reign of Sargon II listed Tabal and Muški together.

===== In Ancient Greek literature =====
The Hittitologist Sanna Aro has suggested that the name of the Tibarēnoi (Τιβαρηνοί) mentioned living on the Black Sea shores of Anatolia in the 5th century BCE by Herodotus of Halicarnassus and Xenophon might possibly have derived their name from that of Tabal.

However, the scholars Federico Giusfredi, Valerio Pisaniello and Alfredo Rizza, following the Hittitologist Zsolt Simon, have rejected this proposal due to the distance between the territory of the Tibarēnoi and of Tabal, the Kartvelian ethnic and linguistic affiliation of the Tibarēnoi as opposed to the Luwic Anatolian one of the Tabalians, and on phonetic grounds.

Nonetheless, despite the Tibarēnoi not being identical with Tabal, the ancient Greek author Herodotus of Halicarnassus drew on the Neo-Assyrian association between Tabal and Muški to link the Tibarēnoi, whom he knew from the earlier reports of Hecataeus (who himself always associated them with the Mossunoikoi), with the Moskhoi, that is with the Muški.

== Society and culture ==
=== Ethnicity ===
Like in the Late Bronze Age and possibly even in the early 2nd millennium BCE, the population of the Tabalian region was largely Luwian, and its population appears to have shared a common cultural identity and canon.

==== Phrygian influence ====
Beginning in the 8th century BCE, southeastern Anatolia came under Phrygian influence, with the Tabalian region being where contact between the Phrygians and the Neo-Hittite states was the most intense:

- the reliefs of Warpalawas II of Tuwana depicted him wearing a tunic and cloak with Phrygian patterns, a close-fitting round cap with a pompom at the front, decorated boots, and jewellery, as well as a Phrygian fibula in one of them;
- several basalt steles from Tuwana were inscribed with the Phrygian script, with one of them having the name of Midas written on it;
- some Tabalians living close to Phrygian speakers of the Halys river region bore Phrygian names:
  - one of these Phrygian names found in the Tabalian region was *Gordiyas (attested in Greek as Górdios (Γόρδιος) and Gordíēs (Γορδίης), which was also the name of the father of Midas) being found among several Tabalian individuals:
    - the name Kurdiyas (Hieroglyphic Luwian: 𔗜𔖱𔑣𔓱𔗔) was borne by a Tabalian commoner, and a shorter form of this name was borne by the king Kurtî (Hieroglyphic Luwian: Kurdis) of Atuna;
  - Gurdî of Kulummu/Til-garimmu also bore this Phrygian name in a non-Luwianised form, suggesting that he might have himself been of Phrygian origin;
  - the name of Mugallu's son Mussi might have been derived from the Phrygian name Mussis (Μουσσις);
  - the name of the king Masauraḫissas of either Tuwana or Tunna might have been a Luwianisation of the Phrygian name Masa Urgitos;
- the Tabalians adopted the use of tumulus burials from the Phrygians, and the tumulus at Kaynarca near Bor contained Phrygian-style light bronze grave goods.

=== Political organisation ===
According to both Neo-Assyrian sources and local inscriptions, the Tabalian region was politically divided into several small city-states with porous and shifting borders who had uneasy relations with each other and with the Neo-Assyrian Empire, with these relations being characterised by shifting alliances and internal hostilities. Due to the rugged terrain of this part of Anatolia, which was easy to defend, both internal political unity as well as conquest by outside powers were difficult.

The Tabal region was a holdout where the rulers claimed descent, unclear whether real or imagined, from the dynasties of the Hittite Empire.

Although some local rulers claimed the title of "Great King" (Hieroglyphic Luwian: 𔐒, romanized: uras ḫantawattis) and the Neo-Assyrian Empire later tried to impose a single ruler upon the whole Tabalian region, it remained perpetually divided into several polities ruled by kings who were perpetually involved in petty hostilities and manoeuvring between each other.

=== Writing ===
The Tabalian region was one of the last regions of Anatolia where the Luwian Hieroglyphic script still remained in use after the Bronze Age Collapse.

=== Trade ===
Decorated serving wares produced regionally in the Tabalian region used for the consumption of beer or wine was traded intra-regionally.

=== Religion ===
Several Luwian deities as well as deities of Hurrian and Semitic origin are attested in the Tabalian region, such as:

- the storm-god Tarḫunzas (Hieroglyphic Luwian: 𔖶𔖖𔗎𔗏𔓢𔕙𔖪𔗔𔖶), especially in his hypostases as:
  - Tarḫunzas of Heaven (Hieroglyphic Luwian: 𔖶𔓑𔖶𔖖𔗎𔗏𔓢𔕙𔖪𔗦𔗷𔖶, romanized: tippasassis Tarḫunzas),
  - Tarḫunzas of the Crag (Hieroglyphic Luwian: 𔖶𔗸𔑰𔓊𔓉𔗔𔖶𔖖𔗎𔗏𔓢𔕙𔑻𔖪𔗔𔖶, romanized: arittallassis Tarḫunzas),
  - and Tarḫunzas of the Vineyard (Hieroglyphic Luwian: 𔖶𔒻𔗬𔖱𔗔𔓉𔗔𔖶𔖖𔗎𔗏𔓢𔕙𔖪𔗔𔖶, romanized: tuwarisassis Tarḫunzas);
- the goddess Kubaba (Hieroglyphic Luwian: 𔖶𔖖𔗎𔗏𔗜𔒚𔕸𔕸𔗔𔖶, romanized: Kubabas), including:
  - her hypostasis as Kubaba of Karkamiš (Hieroglyphic Luwian: 𔖶𔕢𔗧𔖻𔓉𔖪𔗔𔔂𔖶𔖖𔗎𔗏𔗜𔒚𔕸𔕸𔗔𔖶, romanized: Karkamissizas Kubabas),
  - and her ḫasami-hound (Hieroglyphic Luwian: 𔖶𔖖𔗎𔗏𔗜𔒚𔕸𔕸𔗔𔖶𔓷𔗔𔖻𔗔𔖶𔗵𔗬𔗐𔓯𔗦𔖶, romanized: Kubabassa ḫassamis zuwanis);
- the goddess Ḫepat (Hieroglyphic Luwian: 𔖶𔖖𔗎𔗏𔗒𔕯𔐬𔗔𔖶, romanized: Ḫibudas);
- the stag-god Runtiyas (Hieroglyphic Luwian: 𔖶𔖖𔗎𔗏𔑵𔑣𔓱𔗔𔖶):
  - including his hypostasis as Runtiyas of the Countryside (Hieroglyphic Luwian: 𔖶𔓯𔘅𔓉𔗔𔖶𔖖𔗎𔗏𔑵𔑣𔓱𔗔𔖶, romanized: immarassis Runtiyas);
- the otherwise unknown god Sarḫuntas (Hieroglyphic Luwian: 𔖶𔖖𔗎𔗏𔕮𔖱𔕙𔐬𔗔𔖶);
- the god Šarruma (Hieroglyphic Luwian: 𔖶𔖖𔗎𔗏𔑙𔒅𔗔𔖶, romanized: Sarrumas), including his hypostases as:
  - Šarruma the Lord of the Precinct or Šarruma the Warlord (Hieroglyphic Luwian: 𔖶𔔵𔐑𔖶𔖖𔗎𔗏𔑙𔒅𔗔𔖶, romanized: warpallawis Sarrumas),
  - Šarruma of Ḫarran (Hieroglyphic Luwian: 𔖶𔕆𔐤𔗬𔗐𔗔𔖶𔖖𔗎𔗏𔑚𔒅𔗔𔖶, romanized: Ḫarranawannis Sarrumas),
  - and Šarruma the Mountain-king (Hieroglyphic Luwian: 𔖶𔓬𔐑𔖶𔖖𔗎𔗏𔑙𔒅𔗔𔖶, romanized: watta=ḫantawattis Sarrumas);
- the god Ea (Hieroglyphic Luwian: 𔖶𔖖𔗎𔗏𔓯𔓱𔗔𔖶, romanized: Iyas);
- the goddess Allanzu (Hieroglyphic Luwian: 𔖶𔖖𔗎𔗏𔐓𔓊𔗵𔗬𔗔𔖶, romanized: Alanzuwas),
  - including her hypostasis as Allanzu in Ḫarmana (Hieroglyphic Luwian: 𔖶𔖖𔗎𔗏𔐓𔓊𔗵𔗬𔗔𔖶𔕆𔒅𔐤𔔂𔖶, romanized: Alanzuwas Ḫarmana);
- the moon-god Armas (Hieroglyphic Luwian: 𔖶𔖖𔗎𔗏𔓜𔖻𔒅𔗔𔖶)
  - in his hypostasis as Armas of Ḫarran (Hieroglyphic Luwian: 𔖶𔕆𔐤𔗬𔗐𔗔𔖶𔖖𔗎𔗏𔓜𔖻𔒅𔗔𔖶, romanized: Ḫarranawannis Armas);
- the sun-god Tiwazas (Hieroglyphic Luwian: 𔖶𔖖𔗎𔗏𔓚𔗬𔖪𔗔𔖶);
- the god Santas (Hieroglyphic Luwian: 𔖶𔖖𔗎𔗏𔑶𔑯𔗔𔖶);
  - the Dark gods of Santas (Hieroglyphic Luwian: 𔖶𔖖𔗎𔗏𔑷𔑰𔓉𔓯𔖩𔖶𔖶𔖖𔗎𔗏𔘅𔖱𔗬𔓯𔖩𔓯𔖶, romanized: Santassinzi Marwainzi);
- the goddess Nikarawa (Hieroglyphic Luwian: 𔖶𔖖𔗎𔗏𔗐𔗧𔗑𔓷𔗔𔖶, romanized: Nikkaruḫas),
  - including a hypostasis of her as Nikarawa from the Dark gods (Hieroglyphic Luwian: 𔖶𔖖𔗎𔗏𔒅𔗑𔓁𔓁𔗐𔗔𔖶𔖖𔗎𔗏𔗐𔗧𔗑𔓷𔗔𔖶, romanized: Marwawannis Nikkaruḫas);
- the god Marduk (Hieroglyphic Luwian: 𔖶𔖖𔗎𔗏𔒅𔗑𔑣𔗧𔗔𔖶, romanized: Marutikas);
- and several gods of Heaven and Earth (Hieroglyphic Luwian: 𔖶𔓑𔗎𔗏𔑣𔕸𔓉𔖩𔖶𔖖𔗎𔗏𔗐𔖩𔖶𔓤𔗎𔗏𔑰𔑷𔕰𔖱𔓉𔖩𔖶, romanized: tippasassinzi massaninzi taskwarrassinzi), and of the Underworld (Hieroglyphic Luwian: 𔖶𔐓𔑰𔓷𔓉𔖩𔖶𔖖𔗎𔗏𔗐𔓯𔖩𔖶, romanized: antaḪassinzi massaninzi).

The goddess Maliya might also have continued to be worshipped in the Tabalian region.

The god Santas, the goddess Kubaba, and the Dark gods were associated together as deities who harmed evil-doers, and several Tabalian inscriptions invoked them for protection against evil-doers:

- an inscription from Sultanhan contained a curse which invoked the god Armas of Ḫarran, Kubaba of Karkamiš, and the gods of Heaven and the Earth and of the Underworld against whoever would harm a vineyard;
- at Kayseri, an inscription invoked Tarḫunzas, the Dark god (Maruwa), Nikkaruḫas, and Kubaba against an evil-doer;
- at Bulgarmarden, a curse invoked Kubaba and Nikkaruḫas, but not the Dark god;
- the 2nd Kululu inscription referred to Santas and invoked the Dark gods to attack anyone who would desacrate the tomb of the inscription's author.

There was significant religious continuity in the Tabalian region over its history: six deities mentioned in a Tabalian stele - Tarḫunzas, Ḫepat, Ea, Kubaba, Šarruma, and Allanzu - were already attested in the Bronze Age, and worship of the Mount Ḫarḫaras, already attested in the 8th century BC, continued into Classical Antiquity, by which time it was known as Mount Argaeus.

In the western Tabalian region, the sites of the peak sanctuaries on the Mounts Karadağ and Kızıldağ established by the king Ḫartapus were later reused as churches in the Byzantine period.

The Mount Göllüdağ, located between Tuwana and Tabal proper, was also a site with religious focus.

The goddess Kubaba was prominent in the Tabalian region, and the religious inscriptions from this region relating to the goddess Kubaba reflected a Hurro-Luwian cultic tradition, deriving from a tradition fundamentally originating from the Late Bronze Age cults of Kizzuwatna, as attested by how they paired the goddess Kubaba with other deities from Kizzuwatna, such as most often with Tarḫunzas, sometimes with Ea, and occasionally with Hurrian deities like Ḫepat, Šarruma and Allanzu. This suggests that the religious traditions of Kizzuwatna from the 2nd millennium BC had either persisted in the Tabalian region, or had undergone a resurgence there in the 1st millennium BC.

The dedications to Kubaba following royal building projects, possibly including shrines, and in a later inscription providing to a local ruler, also reflected the traditions of Kizzuwatna, although a reference to Kubaba of Karkamis in a curse formula by a subject of Wasusarmas also showed religious interactions with the kingdom of Karkamis.

A possible Tabalian influence on Phrygian religion might have been the epithet areyasti applied to the Phrygian goddess Matar on the Arzastis Monument: this epithet could have been borrowed from Luwian ariyatallis, applied to the god Tarḫunzas and possibly meaning lit. 'of the Mountain'.

== Archaeology ==
Several Tabalian sites have been excavated:

- in Tuwana, these include Porsuk-Zeyve Höyük, Niğde-Kınık Höyük, and a mountain retreat in the volcanic crater of Göllü Dağ;
- in the northern Tabalian region, these include Kaman-Kalehöyük, Alişar Höyük, Uşaklı Höyük, Çadır Höyük, and the former Hittite imperial capital of Boğazköy;
- in the northeastern Tabalian region, these include Kültepe, Sultanhan Höyük, Kululu, and Havuzköy;
- Ova Ören was a northwest Tabalian site.

=== Material culture ===
Attested Tabalian material culture is characterised by rock reliefs, rock stelae, and funerary stelae.

The polities of the Tabalian region continued strategies of empowerment from the Hittite Empire, especially through their use of language and architecture, such as at Kinik: among these, the settlements in the former Hittite core territory were the most varied and complex.

Tabalian pottery belonged to the Silhouette Ware or Alişar IV Ware of the 9th to 7th centuries BCE which had originated in Early Iron Age pottery from the Halys bend and which was uniformly used through the area stretching from the southern foothills of the Pontic Mountains to the region of what is presently Göllüdağ or Niğde and the Taurus Mountains.

During the Middle and Late Iron Age, pottery in the northern Tabalian region, such as at Boğazköy and Çadır, was both locally produced and imported from outside: regionally produced tablewares were exchanged, while storage or transport vessels were produced locally.

In the Konya Plain, both Alişar IV and Phrygian Grey Ware are attested, implying that this section of the Tabalian region was located at the confluence of multiple ceramic traditions. A similar presence of both these wares was also present in the bend of the Halys river.

== List of rulers ==
- ᵐIškallû (Neo-Assyrian Akkadian: 𒁹𒅖𒅗𒇻𒌋 and 𒁹𒅖𒆗𒇻𒌑), r. c. 675 BCE
- ᵐMugallu (Neo-Assyrian Akkadian: 𒁹𒈬𒃲𒇻), r. c. 669 – c. 651 BCE
- ᵐMussi (Neo-Assyrian Akkadian: 𒁹𒈬𒊻𒋛), r. c. 640 BCE

== See also ==
- Ancient regions of Anatolia

== Sources ==
- Adalı, Selim Ferruh (2017). "Cimmerians and the Scythians: the Impact of Nomadic Powers on the Assyrian Empire and the Ancient Near East". In Kim, Hyun Jin; Vervaet, Frederik Juliaan; Adalı, Selim Ferruh (eds.). Eurasian Empires in Antiquity and the Early Middle Ages Contact and Exchange between the Graeco- Roman World, Inner Asia and China. Cambridge: Cambridge University Press. pp. 60–82. ISBN 978-1-107-19041-2.
- Adalı, Selim Ferruh (2023). "The Phantom Menace? The Chronology of Cimmerian Expeditions, Territories and Zones of Influence in Anatolia". In Draycott, Catherine M.; Branting, Scott; Lehner, Joseph W.; Özarslan, Yasemin (eds.). From Midas to Cyrus and Other Stories: Papers on Iron Age Anatolia in Honour of Geoffrey and Françoise Summers. BIAA Monograph Series. London, United Kingdom: British Institute at Ankara. pp. 209–228. ISBN 978-1-912-09011-2.
- Aro, Sanna (2013). "Tabal". In Streck, Michael P. [in German]; Frantz-Szabó, Gabriella; Krebernik, Manfred [in German]; Bonacossi, D. Morandi; Postgate, J. N.; Seidl, Ursula [in German]; Stol, M.; Wilhelm, Gernot [in German] (eds.). Reallexikon der Assyriologie und Vorderasiatischen Archäologie [Encyclopaedia of Ancient Near Eastern Studies] (in German). Vol. 13. Berlin, Germany; New York City, United States: Walter de Gruyter. ISBN 978-3-110-30715-3.
- Aro, S. (2014). "Uassurme". In Streck, Michael P. [in German]; Frantz-Szabó, Gabriella; Krebernik, Manfred [in German]; Bonacossi, D. Morandi; Postgate, J. N.; Seidl, Ursula [in German]; Stol, M.; Wilhelm, Gernot [in German] (eds.). Reallexikon der Assyriologie und Vorderasiatischen Archäologie [Encyclopaedia of Ancient Near Eastern Studies] (in German). Vol. 14. Berlin, Germany; New York City, United States: Walter de Gruyter. p. 257. ISBN 978-3-110-41761-6.
- Aro, Sanna (2023). "Vanishing kingdoms: Tabal and Tuwana during the seventh century BC". In Draycott, Catherine M.; Branting, Scott; Lehner, Joseph W.; Özarslan, Yasemin (eds.). From Midas to Cyrus and Other Stories: Papers on Iron Age Anatolia in Honour of Geoffrey and Françoise Summers. BIAA Monograph Series. London, United Kingdom: British Institute at Ankara. pp. 113–135. ISBN 978-1-912-09011-2.
- Baker, Heather D. (2023). "The Assyrian Empire: A View from Within". In Radner, Karen; Moeller, Nadine; Potts, Daniel T. (eds.). The Age of Assyria. The Oxford History of the Ancient Near East. Vol. 4. New York City, United States: Oxford University Press. pp. 257–351. ISBN 978-0-190-68763-2.
- Bryce, Trevor (2009). The Routledge Handbook of the Peoples and Places of Ancient Western Asia: From the Early Bronze Age to the Fall of the Persian Empire. London, United Kingdom: Routledge. ISBN 978-0-415-39485-7.
- Bryce, Trevor (2012). The World of The Neo-Hittite Kingdoms: A Political and Military History. Oxford, United Kingdom: Oxford University Press. ISBN 978-0-199-21872-1.
- D'Alfonso, Lorenzo (2012). "Tabal, an 'out-group' definition in the first Millennium BCE". In Lanfranchi, Giovanni B.; Bonacossi, Daniele Morandi; Pappi, Cinzia; Ponchia, Simonetta [in German] (eds.). Leggo! Studies Presented to Frederick Mario Fales on the Occasion of His 65ᵗʰ Birthday. Wiesbaden, Germany: Harrassowitz Verlag. pp. 173–194. ISBN 978-3-447-06659-4.
- D'Alfonso, Lorenzo (2019). "War in Anatolia in the post-Hittite period: the Anatolian Hieroglyphic inscription of TOPADA revised". Journal of Cuneiform Studies. 71. University of Chicago Press for the American Schools of Oriental Research: 133–152. doi:10.1086/703857.
- D'Alfonso, Lorenzo; Pedrinazzi, Matteo (2021). "Forgetting an Empire, Creating a New Order: Trajectories of Rock-cut Monuments from Hittite into Post-Hittite Anatolia, and the Afterlife of the "Throne" of Kızıldağ". In Ben-Dov, Jonathan; Rojas, Felipe (eds.). Afterlives of Ancient Rock-cut Monuments in the Near East: Carvings in and out of Time. Culture and History of the Ancient Near East. Vol. 123. Leiden, Netherlands: BRILL. pp. 114–160. ISBN 978-9-004-46208-3.
- Dewar, Ben (2016). "Rebellion, Sargon II's "Punishment" and the Death of Aššur-nādin-šumi in the Inscriptions of Sennacherib". Journal of Ancient Near Eastern History. 3 (1): 25–38. doi:10.1515/janeh-2016-0015.
- Diakonoff, I. M. (1985). "Media". In Gershevitch, Ilya (ed.). The Cambridge History of Iran. Vol. 2. Cambridge, United Kingdom: Cambridge University Press. pp. 36–148. ISBN 978-0-521-20091-2.
- Ebeling, E. [in German] (1932). "Ambaris". In Ebeling, Erich [in German]; Meissner, Bruno (eds.). Reallexikon der Assyriologie und Vorderasiatischen Archäologie [Encyclopaedia of Ancient Near Eastern Studies] (in German). Vol. 1. Berlin, Germany; Leipzig, Germany: Walter de Gruyter. pp. 93–94.
- Fales, Frederick Mario [in Italian] (2014). "The Road to Judah: 701 BCE in the Context of Sennacherib's Political Military Strategy". In Kalimi, Isaac; Richardson, Seth (eds.). Sennacherib at the Gates of Jerusalem: Story, History and Historiography. Culture and History of the Ancient Near East. Leiden: Brill. pp. 223–248. ISBN 978-9-004-26561-5.
- Fales, F. M. [in Italian] (2016). "Til-Garimmu". In Streck, Michael P. [in German]; Frantz-Szabó, Gabriella; Krebernik, Manfred [in German]; Bonacossi, D. Morandi; Postgate, J. N.; Seidl, Ursula [in German]; Stol, M.; Wilhelm, Gernot [in German] (eds.). Reallexikon der Assyriologie und Vorderasiatischen Archäologie [Encyclopaedia of Ancient Near Eastern Studies]. Vol. 14. Berlin, Germany; New York City, United States: Walter de Gruyter. pp. 43–44. ISBN 978-3-110-41761-6.
- Fuchs, Andreas (2023). "The Medes and the Kingdom of Mannea". In Radner, Karen; Moeller, Nadine; Potts, Daniel T. (eds.). The Age of Assyria. The Oxford History of the Ancient Near East. Vol. 4. New York City, United States: Oxford University Press. pp. 674–768. ISBN 978-0-190-68763-2.
- Giusfredi, Federico (2010). Sources for a Socio-Economic History of the Neo-Hittite States. Texte der Hethiter. Vol. 28. Heidelberg: Universitätsverlag Winter. ISBN 978-3-825-35810-5.
- Giusfredi, Federico; Pisaniello, Valerio; Rizza, Alfredo (2021). "On the origin and meaning of the Assyrian toponym Tabal". Aramazd. Armenian Journal of Near Eastern Studies. 15 (1–2): 128–140. doi:10.32028/ajnes.v15i1-2.1301.
- Goedegebuure, Petra; van den Hout, Theo; Osborne, James; Massa, Michele; Bachhuber, Christoph; Şahin, Fatma (2020). "TÜRKMEN-KARAHÖYÜK 1: a new Hieroglyphic Luwian inscription from Great King Hartapu, son of Mursili, conqueror of Phrygia". Anatolian Studies: Journal of the British Institute at Ankara. 70. Cambridge University Press on behalf of the British Institute at Ankara: 29–43. doi:10.1017/S0066154620000022.
- Grayson, A. K. (1991c). "Assyria 668-635 B.C.: the reign of Ashurbanipal". In Boardman, John; Edwards, I. E. S.; Hammond, N. G. L.; Sollberger, E.; Walker, C. B. F. (eds.). The Assyrian and Babylonian Empires and other States of the Near East, from the Eighth to the Sixth Centuries B.C. The Cambridge Ancient History. Vol. 3. Cambridge, United Kingdom: Cambridge University Press. pp. 142–161. ISBN 978-1-139-05429-4.
- Grousset, René (1970). The Empire of the Steppes: A History of Central Asia. Translated by Walford, Naomi. New Brunswick, United States: Rutgers University Press. ISBN 978-0-813-51304-1.
- Hawkins, J. D. [in German] (1975). "Ḫulli". In Edzard, Dietz Otto; Calmeyer, P.; Moortgat, A.; Otten, H.; Röllig, Wolfgang [in German]; v. Soden, W.; Wiseman, D. J. (eds.). Reallexikon der Assyriologie und Vorderasiatischen Archäologie [Encyclopaedia of Ancient Near Eastern Studies]. Vol. 4. Berlin, Germany; New York City, United States: Walter de Gruyter. pp. 490–491. ISBN 978-3-110-06772-9.
- Hawkins, J. D. [in German] (1997a). "Mugallu". In Edzard, Dietz Otto; Calmeyer, P.; Postgate, J. N.; Röllig, W. [in German]; von Soden, W.; Stol, M.; Wilhelm, G. (eds.). Reallexikon der Assyriologie und vorderasiatischen Archäologie [Encyclopaedia of Ancient Near Eastern Studies]. Vol. 8. Berlin, Germany; New York City, United States: Walter de Gruyter. p. 406. ISBN 978-3-110-14809-1.
- Hawkins, J. D. [in German] (1997b). "Muli". In Edzard, Dietz Otto; Calmeyer, P.; Postgate, J. N.; Röllig, W. [in German]; von Soden, W.; Stol, M.; Wilhelm, G.; Frantz-Szabó, Gabriella (eds.). Reallexikon der Assyriologie und vorderasiatischen Archäologie [Encyclopaedia of Ancient Near Eastern Studies]. Vol. 8. Berlin, Germany; New York City, United States: Walter de Gruyter. p. 414. ISBN 978-3-110-14809-1.
- Hawkins, John David [in German] (2000b). Inscriptions of the Iron Age, Part 2: Text: Amuq, Aleppo, Hama, Tabal, Assur Letters, Miscellaneous, Seals, Indices. Corpus of Hieroglyphic Luwian Inscriptions. Vol. 1. Berlin, Germany; New York City, United States: Walter de Gruyter. ISBN 978-3-110-10864-4.
- Hawkins, John David [in German] (2000c). Inscriptions of the Iron Age, Part 3: Plates. Corpus of Hieroglyphic Luwian Inscriptions. Vol. 1. Berlin, Germany; New York City, United States: Walter de Gruyter. ISBN 978-3-110-10864-4.
- Hawkins, J.D. [in German] (2008). "Que". In Streck, Michael P. [in German]; Frantz-Szabó, Gabriella; Krebernik, M. [in German]; Postgate, J.N.; Seidl, U. [in German]; Stol, M.; Wilhelm, G. [in German]; Ecklin, Sabine (eds.). Reallexikon der Assyriologie und Vorderasiatischen Archäologie [Encyclopaedia of Ancient Near Eastern Studies] (in German). Vol. 11. Berlin, Germany; New York City, United States: Walter de Gruyter. pp. 191–195. ISBN 978-3-110-20383-7.
- Hawkins, J. D. [in German] (2014). "Urballa(ʾa)". In Streck, Michael P. [in German]; Frantz-Szabó, Gabriella; Krebernik, Manfred [in German]; Bonacossi, D. Morandi; Postgate, J. N.; Seidl, Ursula [in German]; Stol, M.; Wilhelm, Gernot [in German] (eds.). Reallexikon der Assyriologie und Vorderasiatischen Archäologie [Encyclopaedia of Ancient Near Eastern Studies]. Vol. 14. Berlin, Germany; New York City, United States: Walter de Gruyter. ISBN 978-3-110-41761-6.
- Hutter, Manfred (2017). "Kubaba in the Hittite Empire and the Consequences for her Expansion to Western Anatolia". L'hittitologie aujourd'hui: Études sur l'Anatolie hittite et néo-hittite à l'occasion du centenaire de la naissance d'Emmanuel Laroche [Hittitology today: Studies on Hittite and Neo-Hittite Anatolia in Honor of Emmanuel Laroche's 100th Birthday]. Istanbul, Turkey: Institut français d'études anatoliennes. pp. 113–122. ISBN 978-2-362-45083-9.
- Ivantchik, Askold (1993a). Les Cimmériens au Proche-Orient [The Cimmerians in the Near East] (PDF) (in French). Fribourg, Switzerland; Göttingen, Germany: Éditions Universitaires Fribourg (Switzerland); Vandenhoeck & Ruprecht (Germany). ISBN 978-3-727-80876-0.
- Kealhofer, Lisa; Grave, Peter; Marsh, Ben (2023). "In search of Tabal, central Anatolia: Iron Age interaction at Alişar Höyük". Anatolian Studies: Journal of the British Institute at Ankara. 73. Cambridge University Press on behalf of the British Institute at Ankara: 69–98. doi:10.1017/S0066154623000029.
- Kryszeń, Adam (2023). "Tapala". Hittite Toponyms. University of Mainz; University of Würzburg.
- Massa, Michele; Osborne, James F.; Goedegebuure, Petra; van den Hout, Theo (2019). A New Iron Age Kingdom in Anatolia (Video lecture). Chicago, United States: Oriental Institute.
- Lovejoy, Nathan; Matessi, Alvise D.G. (2023). "Kubaba and other Divine Ladies of the Syro-Anatolian Iron Age: Developmental Trajectories, Local variations, and Interregional Interactions". In Warbinek, Livio; Giusfredi, Federico (eds.). Theonyms, Panthea and Syncretisms in Hittite Anatolia and Northern Syria: Proceedings of the TeAI Workshop Held in Verona, March 25-26, 2022. Florence, Italy: Firenze University Press. pp. 109–126. ISBN 979-1-221-50108-7.
- Melville, Sarah C. (2010). "Kings of Tabal: Politics; Competition, and Conflict in a Contested Periphery". In Richardson, Seth (ed.). Rebellions and Peripheries in the Cuneiform World. New Haven, United States: American Oriental Society. ISBN 978-0-940-49023-9.
- Mouton, Alice; Yakubovich, Ilya (2021). "Where did one speak luwili? Geographic and linguistic diversity of Luwian cuneiform texts". Journal of Language Relationship. 19 (1–2): 25–53. doi:10.1515/jlr-2021-191-208 (inactive 12 July 2025).
- Obrador-Cursach, Bartomeu (2019). "Γορδίας and Γόρδιον: a remark on Phrygian onomastics and ethnics". Journal of Indo-European Studies. 47 (3–4): 545–552.
- Olbrycht, Marek Jan (2000a). "The Cimmerian Problem Re-Examined: the Evidence of the Classical Sources". In Pstrusińska, Jadwiga [in Polish]; Fear, Andrew (eds.). Collectanea Celto-Asiatica Cracoviensia. Kraków: Księgarnia Akademicka. pp. 71–100. ISBN 978-8-371-88337-8.
- Osborne, James F.; Massa, Michele; Şahin, Fatma; Erpehlivan, Hüseyin; Bachhuber, Christoph (2020). "The city of Hartapu: results of the Türkmen-Karahöyük Intensive Survey Project". Anatolian Studies: Journal of the British Institute at Ankara. 70. Cambridge University Press on behalf of the British Institute at Ankara: 1–27. doi:10.1017/S0066154620000046.
- Parzinger, Hermann (2004). Die Skythen [The Scythians] (in German). Munich, Germany: Verlag C.H.Beck. ISBN 978-3-406-50842-4.
- Payne, Annick (2023). "The Kingdom of Phrygia". In Radner, Karen; Moeller, Nadine; Potts, Daniel T. (eds.). The Age of Assyria. The Oxford History of the Ancient Near East. Vol. 4. New York City, United States: Oxford University Press. pp. 865–911. ISBN 978-0-190-68763-2.
- Phillips, E. D. (1972). "The Scythian Domination in Western Asia: Its Record in History, Scripture and Archaeology". World Archaeology. 4 (2): 129–138. doi:10.1080/00438243.1972.9979527. JSTOR 123971.
- Rutherford, Ian (2020). Hittite Texts and Greek Religion: Contact, Interaction, and Comparison. Oxford, United Kingdom: Oxford University Press. ISBN 978-0-199-59327-9.
- Sano, Katsuji (2015). "Der Tod des [M]ussi von Tabāl und die anschließende Ankunft seiner ganzen Sippe und seines Heeres in Assyrien" [The Death of [M]ussi of Tabāl and the Subsequent Arrival of His Entire Clan and Army in Assyria]. Nouvelles Assyriologiques Brèves et Utilitaires [Brief and Useful Assyriological News]. 87 (4): 167–168.
- Schramm, W. (1980). "Iškallū". In Edzard, Dietz Otto; Calmeyer, P.; Moortgat, A.; Otten, H.; Röllig, W. [in German]; v. Soden, W.; Wiseman, D. J. (eds.). Reallexikon der Assyriologie und Vorderasiatischen Archäologie [Encyclopaedia of Ancient Near Eastern Studies] (in German). Vol. 5. Berlin, Germany; New York City, United States: Walter de Gruyter. p. 192. ISBN 978-3-110-07192-4.
- Simon, Zsolt (2013a). "Where is the Land of Sura of the Hieroglyphic Luwian Inscription KARKAMIŠ A4b and Why Were Cappadocians Called Syrians by Greeks?". Altorientalische Forschungen [Ancient Near Eastern Research]. 39 (1). Walter de Gruyter: 167–180. doi:10.1524/aofo.2012.0011.
- Simon, Zsolt (2013b). "Überlegungen zu Masaurhisas, einem König aus Tabal, und der Herrscherliste von Tuwana" [Reflections on Masaurhisas, a king from Tabal, and the king-list of Tuwana]. Anatolica. 39: 277–296. doi:10.2143/ANA.39.0.2990791.
- Simon, Zsolt (2017a). "The Northern Border of Tabal". L'hittitologie aujourd'hui: Études sur l'Anatolie hittite et néo-hittite à l'occasion du centenaire de la naissance d'Emmanuel Laroche: 5e Rencontres d'archéologie de l'IFEA, Istanbul 21-22 novembre 2014 [Hittitology today: Studies on Hittite and Neo-Hittite Anatolia in Honor of Emmanuel Laroche's 100th Birthday: 5th IFEA Archeology Meetings, Istanbul November 21-22, 2014]. Istanbul, Turkey: Institut français d'études anatoliennes. pp. 201–211. ISBN 978-2-362-45083-9.
- Simon, Zsolt (2017b). "Kurtis: A Phrygian Name in the Neo-Hittite World". News from the Lands of the Hittites: Scientific Journal for Anatolian Research. 1. Mimesis Edizioni: 113–118.
- Simon, Zsolt (2018). "Sapaziti, Sapalulme und die Suppiluliumas von W/Pal(a)stin(a/i)" [Sapaziti, Sapalulme and the Suppiluliumas of W/Pal(a)stin(a/i)]. Altorientalische Forschungen [Ancient Near Eastern Research]. 45 (1). Walter de Gruyter: 122–132. doi:10.1515/aofo-2018-0011.
- Streck, M. P. [in German] (2016). "Tunni". In Streck, Michael P. [in German]; Frantz-Szabó, Gabriella; Krebernik, Manfred [in German]; Bonacossi, D. Morandi; Postgate, J. N.; Seidl, Ursula [in German]; Stol, M.; Wilhelm, Gernot [in German] (eds.). Reallexikon der Assyriologie und Vorderasiatischen Archäologie [Encyclopaedia of Ancient Near Eastern Studies]. Vol. 14. Berlin, Germany; New York City, United States: Walter de Gruyter. pp. 189–190. ISBN 978-3-110-41761-6.
- Sulimirski, Tadeusz; Taylor, T. F. (1991). "The Scythians". In Boardman, John; Edwards, I. E. S.; Hammond, N. G. L.; Sollberger, E.; Walker, C. B. F. (eds.). The Assyrian and Babylonian Empires and other States of the Near East, from the Eighth to the Sixth Centuries B.C. The Cambridge Ancient History. Vol. 3. Cambridge, United Kingdom: Cambridge University Press. pp. 547–590. ISBN 978-1-139-05429-4.
- Summers, Geoffrey D. (2023). "Resizing Phrygia: Migration, State and Kingdom". Altorientalische Forschungen [Ancient Near Eastern Research]. 50 (1). Walter de Gruyter: 107–128. doi:10.1515/aofo-2023-0009.
- Tokhtas'ev, Sergei R. [in Russian] (1991). "Cimmerians". Encyclopædia Iranica. New York City, United States: Encyclopædia Iranica Foundation; Brill Publishers.
- Weeden, Mark (2010). "Tuwati and Wasusarma: Imitating the Behaviour of Assyria". Iraq. 72. British Institute for the Study of Iraq: 39–61. doi:10.1017/S0021088900000589.
- Weeden, Mark (2017). "Tabal and the Limits of Assyrian Imperialism". In Heffron, Yağmur; Stone, Adam; Worthington, Martin (eds.). At the Dawn of History: Ancient Near Eastern Studies in Honour of J. N. Postgate. Vol. 2. Winona, United States: Eisenbrauns. pp. 721–736. ISBN 978-1-57506-471-0.
- Weeden, Mark (2023). "The Iron Age States of Central Anatolia and Northern Syria". In Radner, Karen; Moeller, Nadine; Potts, Daniel T. (eds.). The Age of Assyria. The Oxford History of the Ancient Near East. Vol. 4. New York City, United States: Oxford University Press. pp. 912–1026. ISBN 978-0-190-68763-2.
- Yakubovich, Ilya (2019). "The Mighty Weapon of Tarhunt". In Avetisyan, Pavel S.; Dan, Roberto; Grekyan, Yervand H. (eds.). Over the Mountains and Far Away: Studies in Near Eastern history and archaeology presented to Mirjo Salvini on the occasion of his 80th birthday. Oxford, United Kingdom: Archaeopress Publishing Limited. pp. 544–559. ISBN 978-1-784-91943-6.
