= National Fashion Design Award (Spain) =

- Premio Nacional de Diseño de Moda
- Sponsored by: Ministry of Culture
- Country: Spain
- Reward: €30,000
- First award: 2009
- Website: http://www.mecd.gob.es/cultura/areas/promociondelarte/mc/premiosbbaa/pn-diseno-moda/pndm/presentacion.html

The National Fashion Design Award (Spanish: Premio Nacional de Diseño de Moda) is one of Spain's annual National Awards awarded by the Ministry of Culture. Established in 2009, it recognizes and rewards the work of the entirety of an individual's professional life, or outstanding contributions in the fashion design field. It is endowed with a monetary prize of 30,000 euros.

Candidates for the award are presented by the members of a jury, or by entities related to the fashion design activities, through reasoned proposals addressed to the Ministry of Culture or to the jurors themselves.

== Laureates ==
| Year | Image | Laureate | Ref |
|---|---|---|---|
| 2009 | | Manuel Pertegaz | |
| 2010 | | Paco Rabanne | |
| 2011 | | Elio Berhanyer | |
| 2012 | | Manolo Blahnik | |
| 2013 | | Amaya Arzuaga | |
| 2014 | | Josep Font | |
| 2015 | | Sybilla | |
| 2016 | | David Delfín | |
| 2017 | | Ágatha Ruiz de la Prada | |
| 2018 | | Miguel Adrover | |
| 2019 | | Adolfo Domínguez | |
| 2020 | | Ana Locking | |
| 2021 | | Antonio Alvarado | |
| 2022 | | Ángel Schlesser | |
| 2023 | | Teresa Helbig | |
| 2024 | | Palomo Spain | |
| 2025 | | Juana Martín Manzano | |
