= Amaya o los vascos en el siglo VIII =

1877 novel by Francisco Navarro Villoslada

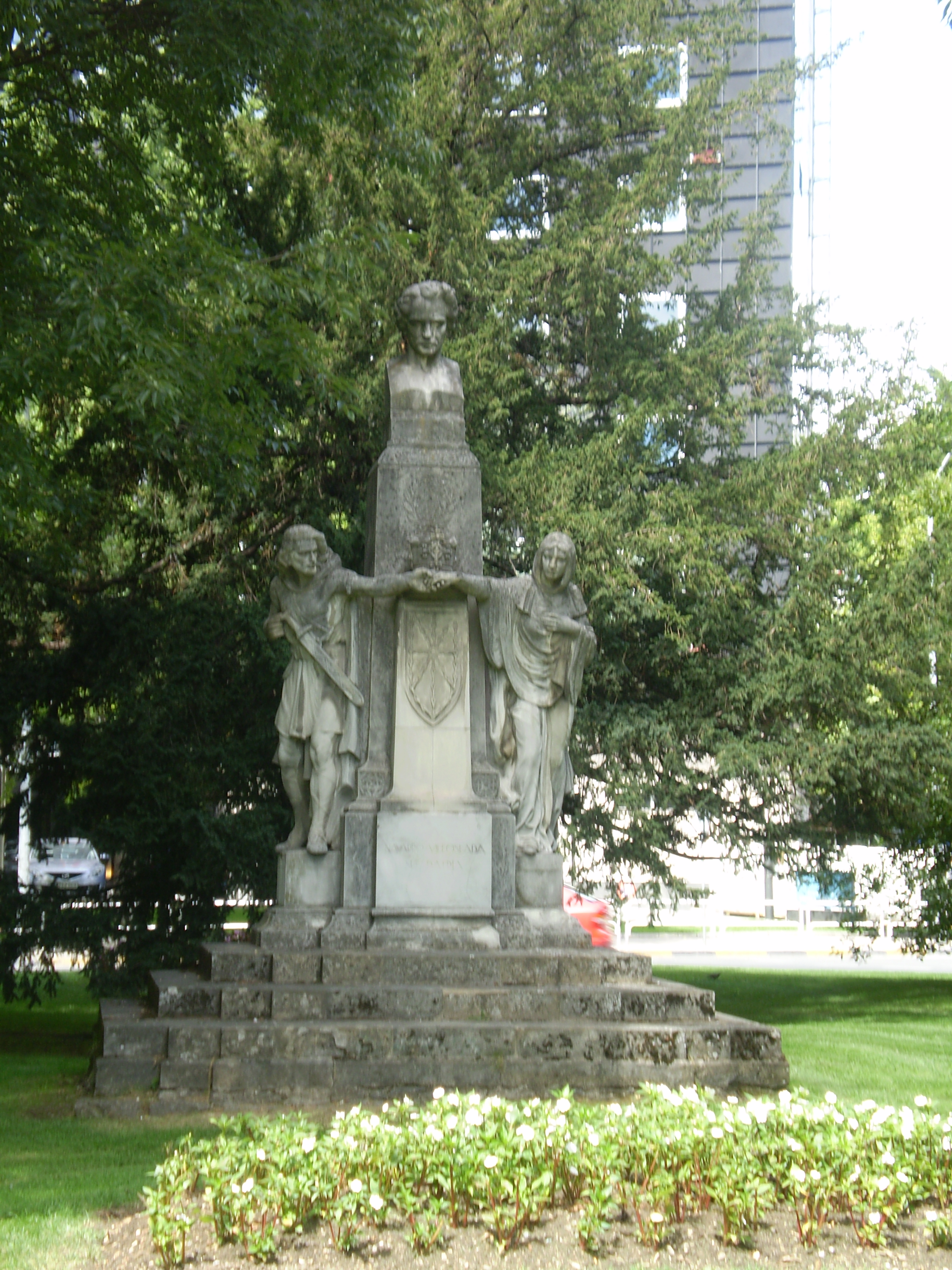
On the monument honoring Navarro Villoslada in Pamplona, Spain, García and Amaya hold hands over the modern coat of arms of Navarre.

Amaya o los vascos en el siglo VIII (Amaya, or the Basques in the 8th century) is a Romantic historical novel published in 1877 (in the magazine Ciencia cristiana) and in 1879 (as a book) by Francisco Navarro-Villoslada, a noted novel by a Navarrese author. The story is placed during the invasion of Visigothic Kingdom by the Moors. In line with the author's conspiracist imaginary, the story-building is permeated by antisemitic prejudice.

== Plot summary ==
Mixing history and legend, it presents a situation in which pagan and Christianized Basques unite under the first king of Navarre and ally with Pelayo, the first king of Asturias to defend Catholic Iberia against the invading Muslims.

Amaya is a Christian noblewoman, daughter of a Basque woman and Ranimiro, the ruthless Visigoth general. She is a niece to pagan leader Amagoya, who prefers her other pagan niece as heiress to the secrets of Aitor, the Basque ancestral patriarch. Pacomio is a Jew conspiring in disguise among Muslims, Visigoths and Basques. Eudes, duke of Cantabria, is Pacomio's son, but, by hiding his Jewish origin, has reached a high post in the Visigoth kingdom and aspires to power beyond what his allies and his father would allow.

At the end, the secret of Aitor is revealed, to recommend Christianity; the pagan Basques (except for Amagoya) convert and Amaya marries the Basque resistance leader, García, becoming the first monarchs of Navarre. The legends of Teodosio de Goñi and San Miguel de Aralar, the Caba Rumía, the Table of Solomon in Toledo, and others are also mentioned in the plot.

== Influences ==
The novel is influenced by the works of Walter Scott and the Catholic movement Carlism, presenting the Navarrese as the defenders of Spanish monarchy and Christianity. The myth of Aitor as an ancestral Basque patriarch comes from Joseph-Augustine Chaho.

The young Miguel de Unamuno was impressed after reading Amaya and Arturo Campión's Blancos y negros. Domingo de Aguirre decided to produce a similar work in Biscayan Basque and published Auñamendiko lorea ("The flower of the Pyrenees")

"Amaia" and "Amagoia" (in modern spelling) are used today as Basque female names. "Asier" is used today as a Basque male name.

Jesús Guridi's opera Amaya (inspired by the novel) debuted at the Coliseo Albia of Bilbao in 1920.

A film version appeared in 1952.

== See also ==
- Irati (film)
