= Asier =

Asier is a male given name of Basque origin, meaning 'the beginning' (hasiera in Standard Basque). It was created for a character in Fernando Navarro Villoslada's 1877 novel Amaya o los vascos en el siglo VIII. Notable people with the name include:

== Given name ==
- Asier Antona (born 1976), Spanish politician
- Asier Arranz (born 1987), Spanish footballer commonly known as Asier
- Asier Barahona (born 1992), Spanish footballer
- Asier Benito (born 1995), Spanish footballer
- Asier Cazalis (born 1972), Venezuelan musician
- Asier Córdoba (born 2000), Spanish footballer
- Asier Cuevas (born 1972), Spanish ultra-marathon runner
- Asier del Horno (born 1981), Spanish footballer
- Asier Eizaguirre (born 1981), Spanish footballer and manager
- Asier Etxaburu (born 1994), Spanish footballer
- Asier Etxeandia (born 1975), Spanish actor
- Asier Fernández (born 1972), Spanish windsurfer
- Asier García Fuentes (born 1966), Spanish footballer commonly known as Asier
- Asier García (born 1981), Spanish wheelchair basketball player
- Asier Garitano (born 1969), Spanish footballer and coach
- Asier Goiria (born 1980), Spanish footballer
- Asier Gomes (born 1998), Spanish footballer
- Asier Guenetxea (born 1970), Spanish cyclist
- Asier Hierro (born 2005), Spanish footballer
- Asier Hormaza (born 1970), Spanish actor
- Asier Illarramendi (born 1990), Spanish footballer commonly known as Illarra
- Asier Maeztu (born 1977), Spanish cyclist
- Asier Martínez (born 2000), Spanish hurdler
- Asier Olaizola (born 1975), Spanish pelota player
- Asier Ormazábal (born 1982), Spanish footballer
- Asier Ortiz de Guinea (born 2002), Spanish footballer
- Asier Osambela (born 2004), Spanish footballer
- Asier Peña Iturria (born 1977), Spanish speed skater
- Asier Polo (born 1971), Spanish cellist
- Asier Riesgo (born 1983), Spanish footballer
- Asier Roldán (born 1980), Puerto Rican Banana Plantation Owner
- Asier Salcedo (born 1980), Spanish footballer
- Asier Santana (born 1979), Spanish football manager
- Asier Villalibre (born 1997), Spanish footballer
- Asier Zengotitabengoa (born 1988), Spanish basketball player

== See also ==
- Amaya (Spanish-language name)
