= Amaya (given name) =

Amaya is a female given name and surname of Spanish origins, derived from the village of Amaya and its neighboring mountain in Castile and León, Spain. The name of the village, in turn, has Indo-European roots and means "am (ma)" or "mother". The suffix io-ia is also used to form action names or toponyms, implying that the meaning of Amaya or Amaia is "mother city", as it will be called later, "the capital". Another hypothesis is that the name derived from the Proto-Basque or Basque word Amaia, meaning "the end". Variations include Amaia, Amayah, Ammaya, and Amya.

Amaya was one of the main villages of the Cantabri Celtic tribes, and played a key role in the Cantabrian wars during the Roman conquest of Hispania, and later, during the Visigothic Kingdom, as the capital of the Duchy of Cantabria. In the first stages of the Reconquista, the city was part of the repopulating efforts of the Kingdom of Asturias in the border region of Bardulia, the primitive territories of Castile.

It became popular in the Basque area after the 1877 novel Amaya o los vascos en el siglo VIII. In 1939, according to the language politics of Francoist Spain, women named Miren Amaia had to change their names to María Fin ("Mary End"). In the 1970s, the reasons for prohibition were that it could lead to confusion about gender. It went against good behavior and it was a Gipsy surname.

A Japanese surname Amaya of unrelated origin also exists, "usually written with characters meaning 'heavenly valley'".

People with the name Amaya, as derived from its Spanish origin, include:

== Given name ==
=== Amaya ===
- Amaya Uranga (born 1947), Spanish singer, member of the Basque folk/pop sextet Mocedades
- Amaya Salazar (born 1951), Dominican artist
- Amaya Arzuaga (born 1970), Spanish fashion designer
- Amaya Garbayo (born 1970), Spanish swimmer
- Amaya Forch (born 1972), Chilean actress and pop singer
- Amaya Valdemoro (born 1976), Spanish basketball player
- Amaya Gastaminza (born 1991), Spanish basketball player
- Amaya Alonso (born 1989), Spanish swimmer
- Maja Keuc (born 1992), Slovenian singer known as Amaya
- Amaya Coppens (born 1994) Nicaraguan student activist
- Amaya Espinal (born 1999), Dominican-American nurse, model and winner of Love Island USA

=== Amaia ===
- Amaia Andrés (born 1966), Spanish middle-distance runner
- Amaia Piedra (born 1972), Spanish athlete who specialized in long-distance running
- Amaia Montero (born 1976), Spanish Basque singer/songwriter, formerly part of the Spanish pop-band La Oreja de Van Gogh
- Amaia Olabarrieta (born 1982), Spanish football player
- Amaia Salamanca (born 1986), Spanish actress
- Amaia González de Garibay (born 1994), Spanish handball player
- Amaia Erbina (born 1997), Spanish rugby sevens player
- Amaia Peña (born 1998), Spanish footballer
- Amaia Romero (born 1999), Spanish singer, representing Spain in Eurovision Song Contest 2018 as a duo Amaia y Alfred

== Surname ==
- See Amaya (surname)

== See also ==
- Amaia, a cultic epithet for the goddess Demeter in Greek mythology
