= Aitor =

- Gender: Male
- Language: Basque, works by Agosti Xaho

Origin
- Meaning: approximately "good father"

Aitor is a Basque masculine given name, created by Agosti Xaho for a Basque ancestral patriarch descending from the Biblical Tubal in his work "The Legend of Aitor" (published in French in the journal Ariel, 1845). Koldo Mitxelena believes Xaho created it from the Souletin Basque expression aitoren semeak or aitonen semeak ("gentry", literally "sons of good fathers" interpreted as "sons of Aitor", aita meaning "father" and on meaning "good"). After Xaho, it was popularized by the Spanish-language novel Amaya o los vascos en el siglo VIII. Nowadays it is a common name among Basque males.

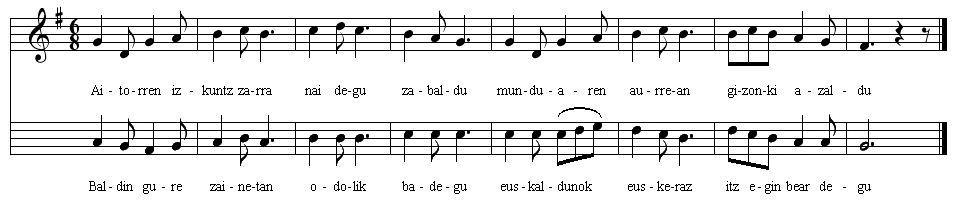
Music for the bertso Aitorren Izkuntz Zarra ("Aitor's Old Language")

Aitorren Izkuntz Zarra

People with the name Aitor include:

== Given name ==
- Aitor Albizua (born 1992), Spanish journalist
- Aitor Aldalur (born 1991), Spanish footballer
- Aitor Ariño (born 1992), Spanish handballer
- Aitor Arregi (born 1990), Spanish footballer
- Aitor Arregi Galdos (born 1977), Spanish filmmaker and screenwriter
- Aitor 'Txiki' Beguiristain (born 1964), Spanish retired footballer who mainly played for Real Sociedad and FC Barcelona, currently director of football of Manchester City
- Aitor Blanco (born 1977), Spanish footballer
- Aitor Buñuel (born 1998), Spanish footballer
- Aitor Calle (born 1976), Spanish footballer and manager
- Aitor Cantalapiedra (born 1996), Spanish footballer, currently playing for Panathinaikos
- Aitor Casas (born 1992), Spanish footballer
- Aitor Córdoba (born 1995), Spanish footballer
- Aitor Elizegi (born 1966), Spanish chef and entrepreneur
- Aitor Embela (born 1996), Spanish footballer, currently playing for UD Somozas
- Aitor Esteban (born 1962), Spanish jurist and politician
- Aitor Etxaburu (born 1966), Spanish handballer and coach
- Aitor Etxeberría (born 1976), Spanish rugby union player
- Aitor Fernández (Spanish footballer, born 1986)
- Aitor Fernández (Spanish footballer, born 1991)
- Aitor Fraga (born 2003), Spanish footballer
- Aitor Gabilondo (born 1972), Spanish screenwriter
- Aitor Galarza (born 2002), Spanish footballer
- Aitor Galdós (born 1979), Spanish road bicycle racer
- Aitor García (born 1994), Spanish footballer
- Aitor Garmendia (born 1968), Spanish cyclist
- Aitor Gelardo (born 2002), Spanish footballer
- Aitor Gismera (born 2004), Spanish footballer
- Aitor González (born 1975), Spanish retired road bicycle racer
- Aitor González (Spanish cyclist, born 1990)
- Aitor Hernández (born 1982), Spanish racing cyclist
- Aitor Iru (born 1968), Spanish footballer and coach
- Aitor Iturrioz (born 1970), Mexican actor
- Aitor Karanka (born 1973), Spanish football manager and retired player who mainly played for Athletic Bilbao and Real Madrid
- Aitor Kintana (born 1975), Spanish cyclist
- Aitor Larrazábal (born 1971), Spanish retired footballer who played for Athletic Bilbao
- Aitor López Rekarte (born 1975), Spanish retired footballer who mainly played for Real Sociedad
- Aitor Luna (born 1981), Spanish actor
- Aitor Mañas (born 2003), Spanish footballer
- Aitor Martínez (born 1985), Spanish footballer and manager
- Aitor Martínez (Spanish swimmer) (born 1993)
- Aitor Monroy (born 1987), Spanish footballer
- Aitor Núñez (born 1987), Spanish footballer, currently playing for Cádiz CF
- Aitor Ocio (born 1976), Spanish retired footballer, well known for playing with Athletic Bilbao and Sevilla FC
- Aitor Oroza Flores (born 1976), Spanish para cyclist
- Aitor Osa (born 1973), Spanish retired road bicycle racer
- Aitor Osorio (born 1975), Andorran swimmer
- Aitor Paredes (born 2000), Spanish footballer
- Aitor Pérez (born 1977), Spanish road bicycle racer
- Aitor Ramos (born 1985), Spanish footballer, currently playing for Arenas Getxo
- Aitor Rodríguez (born 1984), Spanish motorcycle racer
- Aitor Ruibal (born 1996), Spanish footballer
- Aitor Sanz (born 1984), Spanish footballer
- Aitor Seguín (born 1995), Spanish footballer
- Aitor Silloniz (born 1977), Spanish cyclist
- Aitor Throup (born 1980), Argentine artist and designer
- Aitor Tornavaca Fernández (born 1976), Spanish footballer, currently playing for Real Avilés
- Aitor Uzkudun (born 2000), Spanish footballer
- Aitor Zabala (born 1979), Spanish chef
- Aitor Olomo FCB (born 1979), Spanish retired footballer, currently Technical Director at Barca Academy Delhi/NCR

== Middle name ==
- Carlos Aitor Castillo (1913–2000), Peruvian painter, educator and art critic
- Carlos Aitor García (born 1984), Spanish football manager
- Pablo Aitor Bernal (born 1986), Spanish cyclist
