= Tabal =

Tabal may refer to:

- Tabal (region), a region of southern Central Anatolia during the Iron Age.
- Tabal (state), a Luwian-speaking Syro-Hittite petty kingdom that existed during the Iron Age.
