= Ana Locking =

Spanish fashion designer

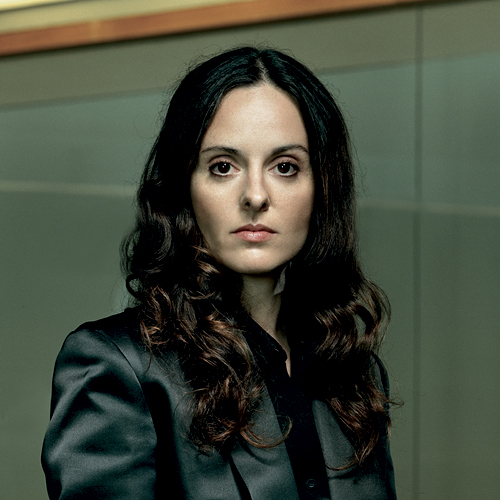
- Latex sculpture made by Ana Locking herself representing herself at MUSAC in 2007
- Born: Ana González Rodríguez; 26 August 1970 (age 56); Toledo, Castilla-La Mancha, Spain
- Education: Complutense University of Madrid
- Occupations: Fashion designer, artist, television personality
- Years active: 1996–present
- Awards: National Fashion Design Award (2020); Gold Medal of Merit in the Fine Arts (2021); Madrid Culture Award (2022)
- Website: http://analocking.com

Ana González Rodríguez (born August 26, 1970), better known as Ana Locking, is a Spanish fashion designer, businesswoman and photographer. She was born in Toledo and educated in Madrid. Ana is also a judge on Drag Race España.

== Career ==
In 1997, Locking, together with Óscar Benito, founded Locking Shocking, a ready-to-wear fashion label claiming to maintain "strong ties with other artistic disciplines." Their partnership lasted until 2007, when the label effectively disappeared due to the decision of their business partner, Humana Cultura y Comunicación. In 2008, Locking launched a new ready-to-wear fashion label, Ana Locking.

In 2021, Locking became a recurring judge on Drag Race España.

== Personal life ==
In 2020, Locking was diagnosed with breast cancer and underwent surgery and radiation therapy. In July 2020, it was confirmed that she was in remission.

== Filmography ==
Year	TV Show	Network	Role
2021–present	Drag Race España	Atresplayer Premium	Judge
2021–present	Tras la carrera	Atresplayer Premium	Host
2024	Drag Race España All Stars	Atresplayer Premium	Judge

== Exhibitions ==
- Back to the Roots Installation - Fashion Collective (Gabarron Foundation- NY)
- 4EYES Video Art - Fashion Collective (New York Public Library - NY)
- Man in a Skirt Fashion Collective (El Casino de la Expo - Sevilla)
- Fashion and the Classics Fashion Collective (Museo Nacional del Teatro - Almagro)
- SkyLight Fashion Collective (Trump Soho - NY)
- Bipolar Installation / sculpture (Forum of Cultures - Barcelona)
- Regret Installation / sculpture (MUSAC - León)
- Nancy dresses in fashion Collective (Museo del Traje - Madrid)
- 20 Icons of the 20th Century Fashion Collective (Museo del Traje - Madrid)
- Not for Three Installation - Video Art (Real Fábrica de Tapices - Madrid)
- 21 Turns to a bag Fashion Collective (IVAM - Valencia)
- Fahrenheit Photography / Video Art (Casa de América - Madrid)
- Köning Video Art (Circuit - Barcelona)

== Awards ==
Year	Award	Ref.
2001	"Generación Joven" Finalist – Caja Madrid "12 Portraits"	
2002	"Generación Joven" Finalist – Caja Madrid "From 35 to 45"	
2003	Premio L'Oréal Paris – Best Young Collection for "Eólica", Locking Shocking	
2004	Marie Claire Gran Prix de la Moda – Best National Designer – Locking Shocking	
2007	Ingenio 400 – Audience Award for the video "Fahrenheit"	
2008	Premio L'Oréal Paris – Best Mercedes-Benz Fashion Week collection for "Reentry"	
2009	CLM Design – Best Designer	
2009	Cosmopolitan Premio Mujer Fun Fearless Female – Best Designer	
2017	MadWoman Award – Best Designer	
2017	Medal of Merit for Fine Arts of Castilla La Mancha – First Edition	
2020	National Fashion Design Award	
2021	Gold Medal of Merit in Fine Arts – Ministry of Culture of Spain	
2022	Madrid Culture Award	
