= Tubal =

Biblical character, son of Japheth

Tubal (Hebrew: תֻּבָל, Tuḇāl), in Genesis 10 (the "Table of Nations"), was a son of Japheth, son of Noah. Modern scholarship has identified him with Tabal. Traditionally, he is considered to be the father of the Caucasian Iberians (ancestors of the Georgians) according to primary sources. Later, Saint Jerome refashioned the Caucasian Iberia (Georgia) into the Iberian Peninsula (Western Europe) and Isidore of Seville consolidated this idea.

== Modern scholarship ==
Modern scholarship has identified the biblical Tubal with Tabal, an Anatolian state and region mentioned in Assyrian sources.

Tabal was a post-Hittite Luwian state in Asia Minor in the 1st millennium BC. Its neighbours, the Mushki, are traditionally associated with Meshech. Some historians further connect Tabal and Tubal with the tribe on the Black Sea coast later known to the Greeks as Tibareni, although this connection is uncertain. The Tibareni and nearby tribes, the Chalybes (Khalib/Khaldi) and the Mossynoeci (Mossynoikoi in Greek), were sometimes considered the founders of metallurgy. The Greeks considered the Tibareni to be a Scythian people.

Most reference books, following Flavius Josephus, identify Tubal in Ezekiel's time as an area that is now in Turkey.

== Early theories ==
Many authors, following the Jewish historian Josephus (1st century AD), related the name to Iber- Caucasian Iberia. Concerning the question of the ethnic affinity of the population of Tubal, Josephus wrote: "Tobal gave rise to the Thobeles, who are now called Iberes" - Caucasian Iberia. This version was repeated by Patriarch Eustathius of Antioch, Bishop Theodoret, and others. However, Jerome, Isidore of Seville, and the Welsh historian Nennius stated another tradition that Tubal was ancestor to not only Iberians, but also the 'Italians' [i.e., Italic tribes] and 'Spanish' [who were also called Iberians]. A divergent tradition recorded by Hippolytus of Rome (3rd century) lists Tubal's descendants as the "Hettali" (or Thessalians in some later copies), while the Book of the Bee (c. 1222) states that he was progenitor of Bithynians.

Tubal's sons are given different names in rabbinic sources. In Pseudo-Philo (written c. AD 70), his son's names are Phanatonova and Eteva, and they were given the land of "Pheed". The later mediaeval Chronicles of Jerahmeel gives these sons' names as Fantonya and Atipa, and says they subdued "Pahath"; elsewhere these chronicles include information derived from Jerome, identifying Tubal's descendants with Iberia and Hispania. In still another place, the Chronicles of Jerahmeel reproduces a more detailed legend taken from the earlier Josippon (c. 950): Tubal's descendants, it says, camped in Tuscany and built a city called "Sabino", while the Kittim built "Posomanga" in neighboring Campania, with the Tiber river as the frontier between the two peoples. However, they soon went to war following the rape of the Sabines by the Kittim. This war was ended when the Kittim showed the descendants of Tubal their mutual progeny. A shorter, more garbled version of this story from Yosippon is also found in the later Book of Jasher, known from c. 1625, which additionally names Tubal's sons as Ariphi, Kesed and Taari.

== Later theories ==
Basque intellectuals like Andrés de Poza (16th century) have named Tubal as the ancestor of Basques, and by extension, the Iberians. The French Basque author Augustin Chaho (19th century) published The Legend of Aitor, asserting that the common patriarch of the Basques was Aitor, a descendant of Tubal.

According to Catalan legend, Japheth's son Tubal is said to have sailed from Jaffa with his family and arrived at the Francolí river of the Iberian Peninsula in 2157 BC, where he founded a city named after his son Tarraho, now Tarragona. He then proceeded to the Ebro (like Iberia, named after his second son Iber), where he built several more settlements, including Amposta. His third son's name is given as Semptofail. Noah himself is said to have visited them here about 100 years later. Tubal is said to have reigned for 155 years, until he died while preparing to colonize Mauretania and was succeeded by Iber.

Other traditions make Tubal son of Japheth (sometimes confounded with Tubal-cain son of Lamech, a figure from before the flood) to be the founder of Ravenna in Italy, Setúbal in Portugal, and Toledo and many other places in Spain. Various authors state that his wife's name was Noya, that he was buried at Cape St. Vincent in Portugal, or that he had 65,000 descendants when he died. The source for many of these legends seems to have been the Pseudo-Berosus published by Annio da Viterbo in 1498, now widely considered a forgery. However, the earlier Chronicle of San Juan de la Peña by the historian-king Pedro IV of Aragon (c. 1370) includes the basic premises, that Tubal was the first person to settle in Iberia, that the Iberians were descended from him as Jerome and Isidore had attested, and that they had originally been called Cetubales and been settled along the Ebro, before changing their name to 'Iberians' after that river.

An earlier scholar-king, Alfonso X of Castile (c. 1280), also included similar details in his history, but claiming Tubal had settled in the "Aspa" mountains (part of the Pyrenees), and deriving the first part of the name Cetubales from cetus, which he said meant "tribe". In his version, they later changed their name to 'Celtiberians'. A still earlier version is found in the history of the Umayyad conquest of Hispania by Tariq ibn Ziyad, written around AD 750 by Abulcasim Tarif Abentarique. It holds that Japheth's son Tubal or (Sem Tofail) divided Iberia among his 3 sons — leaving his eldest Tarraho the northeast section (called Tarrahon, later Aragon); to his second son, Sem Tofail the younger, he left the west, along the ocean (later called Setúbal); and to his youngest, Iber, he left the eastern part, along the Mediterranean, called Iberia. Tubal then built for himself a city he called Morar (today Mérida, Spain) — where Abentarique claimed to have seen a large stone above the main city gate inscribed with these details, which he translated into Arabic.

The Arabic dictionary Taj al-Arus by al-Zubaidi (1790) notes that although some Islamic authors make the Khazars descendants of Japheth's son Khasheh (Meshech), others hold both the Khazars and Saqaliba (Slavs) to have come rather from his brother, Tubal.

Benjamin Martin, an 18th-century lexicographer who compiled one of the early English dictionaries, published in his study on natural philosophy the Bibliotheca Technologica that Tubal "is affirmed to be the father of the Asiatic Iberians". The Caucasian Iberians were ancestors of modern Georgians. Some modern Georgians also claim descent from Tubal, Togarmah and Meshech; a Georgian historian, Ivane Javakhishvili, considered Tabal, Tubal, Jabal and Jubal to be ancient Georgian tribal designations.

== See also ==
- Tabal
- Tubal-cain

== Literature ==
- Ivane Javakhishvili. "Historical-Ethnological problems of Georgia, the Caucasus and the Near East" (a monograph), Tbilisi, 1950, pp. 130–135 (in Georgian)
- Giorgi Melikishvili. "About the history of ancient Georgia" (a monograph), Tbilisi, 1959, pp. 9, 13, 14, 18, 72–78, 108–110, 121, 175, 226, 227, 253 (in Russian)
- Simon Janashia. "Works", vol. III, Tbilisi, 1959, pp. 2–74 (in Georgian)
- Guram Kvirkvelia. "Foreign scientists about the metallurgy of the ancient Georgian tribes" (a monograph), Tbilisi, 1976, pp. 3–90 (in Georgian, Russian summary).
- Nana Khazaradze. "The Ethnopolitical entities of Eastern Asia Minor in the first half of the 1st millennium BC" (a monograph), Tbilisi, 1978, pp. 3–139 (in Georgian, Russian and English)
- * Electronic edition of G. Pujades, Crónica Universal del Principado de Cataluña (in Spanish)
- Jon Ruthven. The Prophecy That Is Shaping History: New Research on Ezekiel's Vision of the End. Fairfax, VA: Xulon Press, 2003. . A major study on the historical geography of Rosh, Meshech, Tubal and the other northern nations listed in Ezekiel 38–39 and elsewhere.
