= Göllü Dağ =

Mountain in Turkey

- Location within Turkey

Highest point
- Elevation: 2,143 m (7,031 ft)
- Coordinates: 38°15′35″N 34°33′0″E

Geography
- Location: Niğde Province, Turkey

Geology
- Mountain type: Lava dome
- Last eruption: Unknown

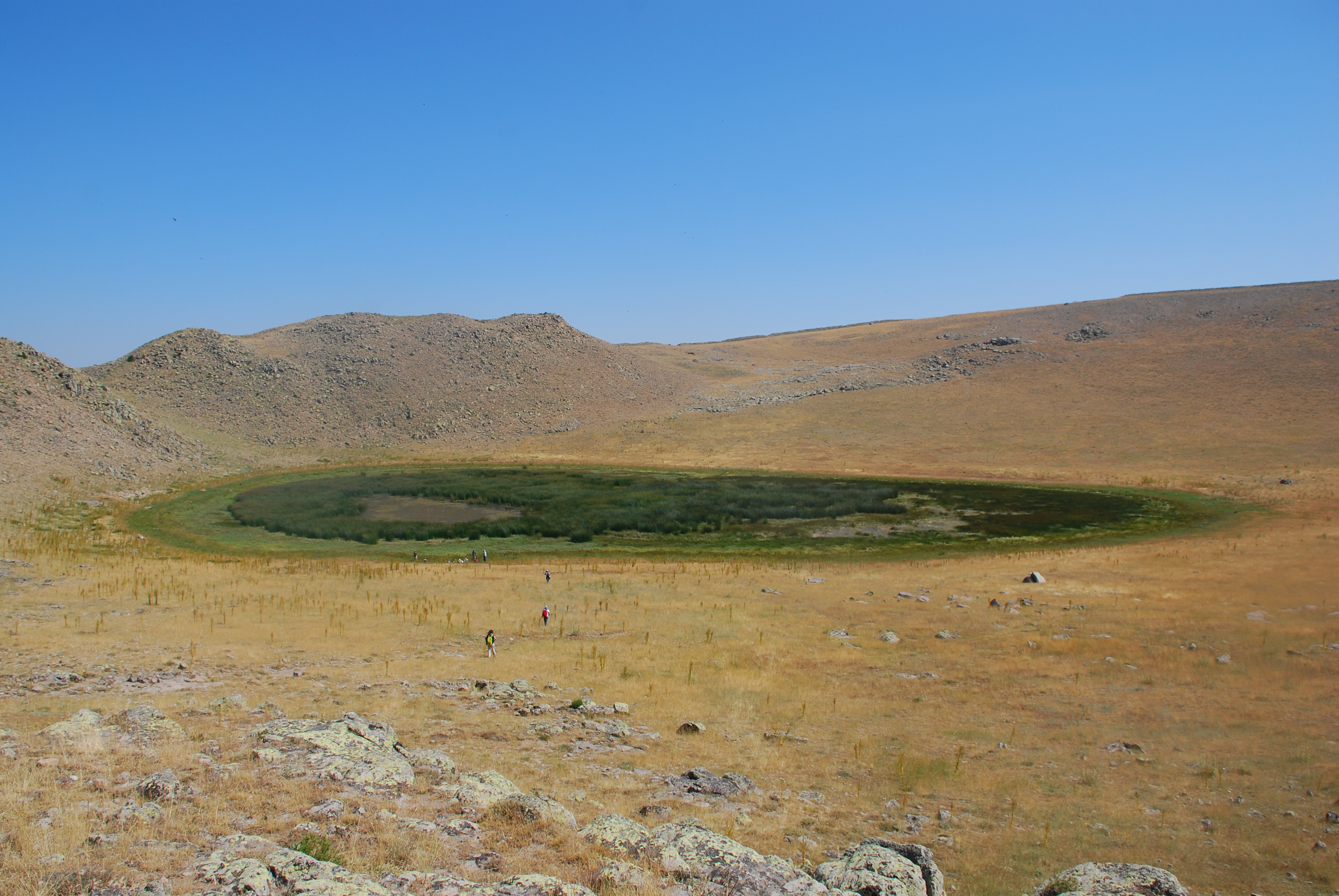
Göllüdağ Crater Lake, Niğde

Göllü Dağ (also Göllüdağ, Golludag) is a volcanic mountain located in central Turkey. This area has a long history of human occupation going back to the Lower Paleolithic period. Humans and human ancestors valued the obsidian found in abundance on the mountain as a raw material for tools and other objects.

== Geology ==
A lava dome of this volcano has produced rhyolite, dacite and basalt. The eruptions have been dated at 1.33 to 0.84 million years by fission track dating of obsidian. The dome lies above the Tertiary Derinkuyu caldera.

== History ==
=== Paleolithic and Neolithic ===
Excavation and pedestrian survey of the slopes of the Göllü Dağ mountain have revealed traces of human occupation extending back to the Lower Paleolithic. Remains of Neolithic and Chalcolithic periods, as well as the Mousterian or Middle Paleolithic, are particularly common. Excavations at the stratified Kaletepe Deresi 3 site brought to light evidence of Middle Paleolithic as well as earlier, Lower Palelolithic occupations with Acheulean handaxes. The ages of the earliest Acheulean occupation layers are not well understood. They are younger than the bedrock, which has been dated to approximately 1.0 million years ago, and older than an overlying layer of tephra dated to roughly 160,000 years ago

Excavations at the Kaletepe (Kömürcü) site revealed an extensive open-air workshop dating to the early Neolithic period. At this locality, obsidian was transformed into blades, most of which were transported away from the site.

=== Obsidian trade ===
Göllü Dağ obsidian was extensively mined, processed and traded to distant areas as far as Cyprus and Syria during the Neolithic and later periods. An artifact made from Göllü Dağ obsidian was discovered in an Upper Paleolithic layer in the Yabrud II rockshelter in Syria, some 700 km distant from the source. Some of the areas where obsidian was processed on Göllü Dağ may be among the earliest such workshops in the world.

=== Iron Age ===
==== Neo-Hittite Tabal ====
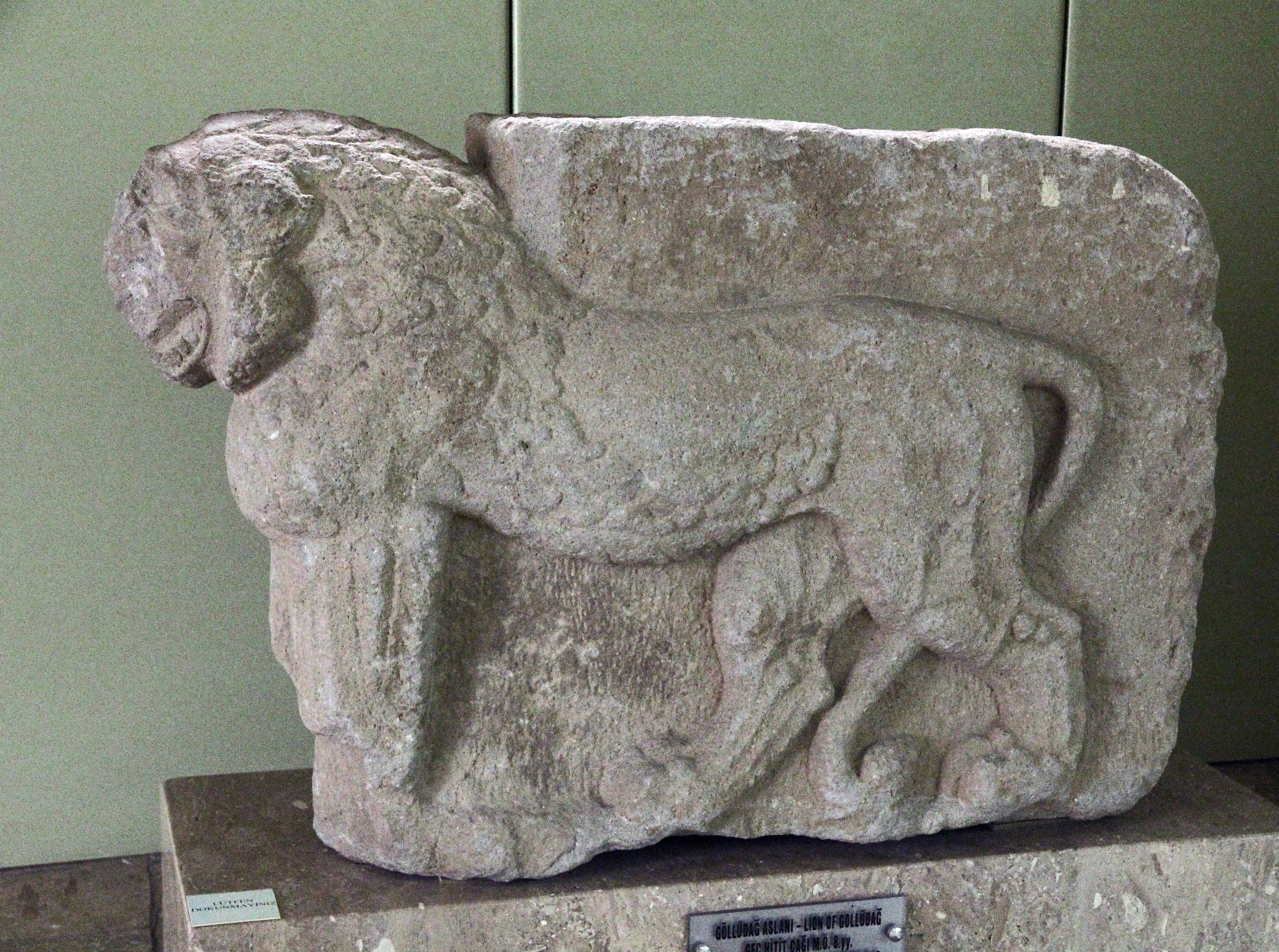
A Neo-Hittite Lion statue from Göllüdağ - Niğde Archaeological Museum

During the early Iron Age period, Göllüdağ belonged to the Tabal state, which was also a part of the larger Tabal (region). High upon the mountain, a large settlement was found dating back to the 8th century BC, the period of Neo-Hittite civilization. The city here was surrounded by a stone wall; the important structures were also protected by a second wall. The largest building at the site, occupying the highest location, measures about 112 by 228 meters.

The lion statues found among the building remains are quite remarkable. Two large double portal lions, two portal lions, and two sphinxes have been discovered. They are now exhibited in the Nigde Museums.

In 2000, a bone fragment thought to belong to an ancestor of horses was found as the result of the erosion of the mountain slope.

Several structural similarities indicate that Göllüdağ was also associated with the settlement on Mount Kerkenes, which is located about 170km north.

== Excavations ==
The excavations here started in 1934 by Remzi Oğuz Arık. Wulf Schirmer excavated here between 1992 and 1998.

== See also ==
- List of volcanoes in Turkey
