= Aitor Ramos =

Spanish footballer

Personal information
- Full name: Aitor Ramos Leniz
- Date of birth: 11 June 1985 (age 41)
- Place of birth: Bilbao, Spain
- Height: 1.78 m (5 ft 10 in)
- Position: Forward

Youth career
- 1995–1996: Bermeo
- 1996–1999: Athletic Bilbao
- 1999–2000: Bermeo
- 2000–2004: Santutxu

Senior career*
Years	Team	Apps	(Gls)
2004–2006	Santutxu	56	(22)
2006–2007	Lemona	22	(5)
2007–2008	Bilbao Athletic	22	(4)
2008	Athletic Bilbao	5	(0)
2008–2009	Écija	18	(3)
2009–2010	Barakaldo	27	(3)
2010–2012	Laudio	61	(17)
2012–2020	Arenas Getxo	211	(45)
2020–2023	Bermeo		
Total		422	(99)
- * Club domestic league appearances and goals

Aitor Ramos Leniz (born 11 June 1985) is a Spanish former footballer who played as a forward.

== Club career ==
Ramos was born in Bilbao, Biscay. After playing with modest Basque clubs in his early career (although he was part of Athletic Bilbao's youth system from ages 11 to 14), he joined Bilbao Athletic for the 2007–08 season, with the reserves competing in the Segunda División B.

Ramos made his first-team debut on 16 January 2008, coming on as a substitute for Tiko during the 1–1 away draw with RCD Espanyol in the round of 16 of the Copa del Rey. His first La Liga appearance came on the 27th in the home fixture against FC Barcelona (45 minutes played, same result), and he went on to play seven competitive matches throughout the campaign, but was mainly registered for the B side.

In July 2008, Ramos was released by Athletic, joining Écija Balompié in the third tier. Remaining in the lower leagues, he returned to his native region after just one season and successively represented Barakaldo CF, amateurs CD Laudio and Arenas Club de Getxo.

Ramos returned to his first club Bermeo FT on 5 June 2020 – two decades after leaving – aged 35.
