= Amaya Garbayo =

Spanish swimmer

Personal information
- Born: March 26, 1970 (age 56)

Sport
- Sport: Swimming

Amaya Garbayo (born 26 March 1970) is a Spanish former swimmer who competed in the 1988 Summer Olympics.
