= Meshech =

Biblical figure, son of Japheth (Genesis 10)

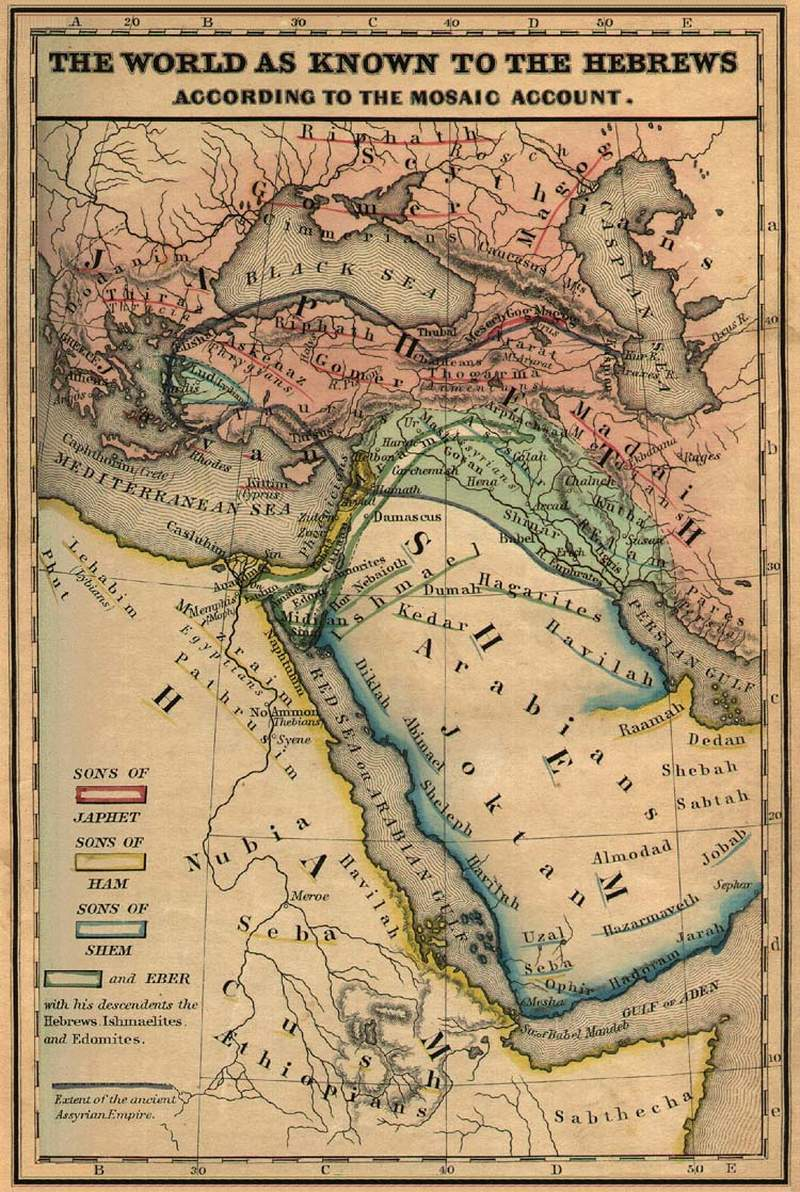
The World as known to the Hebrews. This 1854 map locates Meshech together with Gog and Magog, roughly in the southern Caucasus.

In the Bible, Meshech or Mosoch (Hebrew: מֶשֶׁך Mešeḵ "price" or "precious") is named as a son of Japheth in Genesis 10:2 and 1 Chronicles 1:5.

Another Meshech is named as a son of Shem in 1 Chronicles 1:17 (corresponding to the form Mash in Genesis 10).

== Historical interpretations ==
Meshech is mentioned along with Tubal (and Rosh, in certain translations) as principalities of "Gog, prince of Magog" in Ezekiel 38:2 and 39:1, and is considered a Japhetite tribe, identified by Flavius Josephus with the Cappadocian "Mosocheni" (Mushki, also associated with Phrygians or Bryges) and their capital Mazaca. In Hippolytus of Rome's chronicle (234 AD), the "Illyrians" were identified as Meshech's offspring. In addition, Georgians have traditions that they, and other Caucasus people such as Armenians, share descent from Meshech (Georgian: Meskheti), Tubal, and Togarmah.

In 1498, Annio da Viterbo published fragments known as Pseudo-Berossus, now considered a forgery, claiming that Babylonian records had shown a son of Japheth called Samothes had begun settling what later became Gaul in the 13th year of Nimrod. Later historians such as Raphael Holinshed (1577) identified Samothes as Meshech, and asserted that he first ruled also in Britain.

Beginning from the 16th century, some European scholars proposed the idea that the Muscovites had stemmed from Meshech. Sir Walter Raleigh (c. 1616) attributes this opinion to Philipp Melanchthon (1497–1560) and to Benito Arias Montano (1571), and it was also followed later by Jonathan Edwards (1703–1758). Moreover, according to a legend first appearing in the Kievan Synopsis (1674), Moscow (Moskva) was founded by King Mosokh son of Japheth (i.e. Meshech), and was named for him and his wife, Kva. In this legend, they are also said to have had a son, Ya, and daughter, Vuza, who gave their names to the nearby Yauza River.

According to Archibald Sayce, Meshech can be identified with Muska, a name appearing in Assyrian inscriptions, and generally believed to refer to the Mushki.

Most reference books since Flavius Josephus generally identify Meshech in Ezekiel's time as an area in modern Turkey.

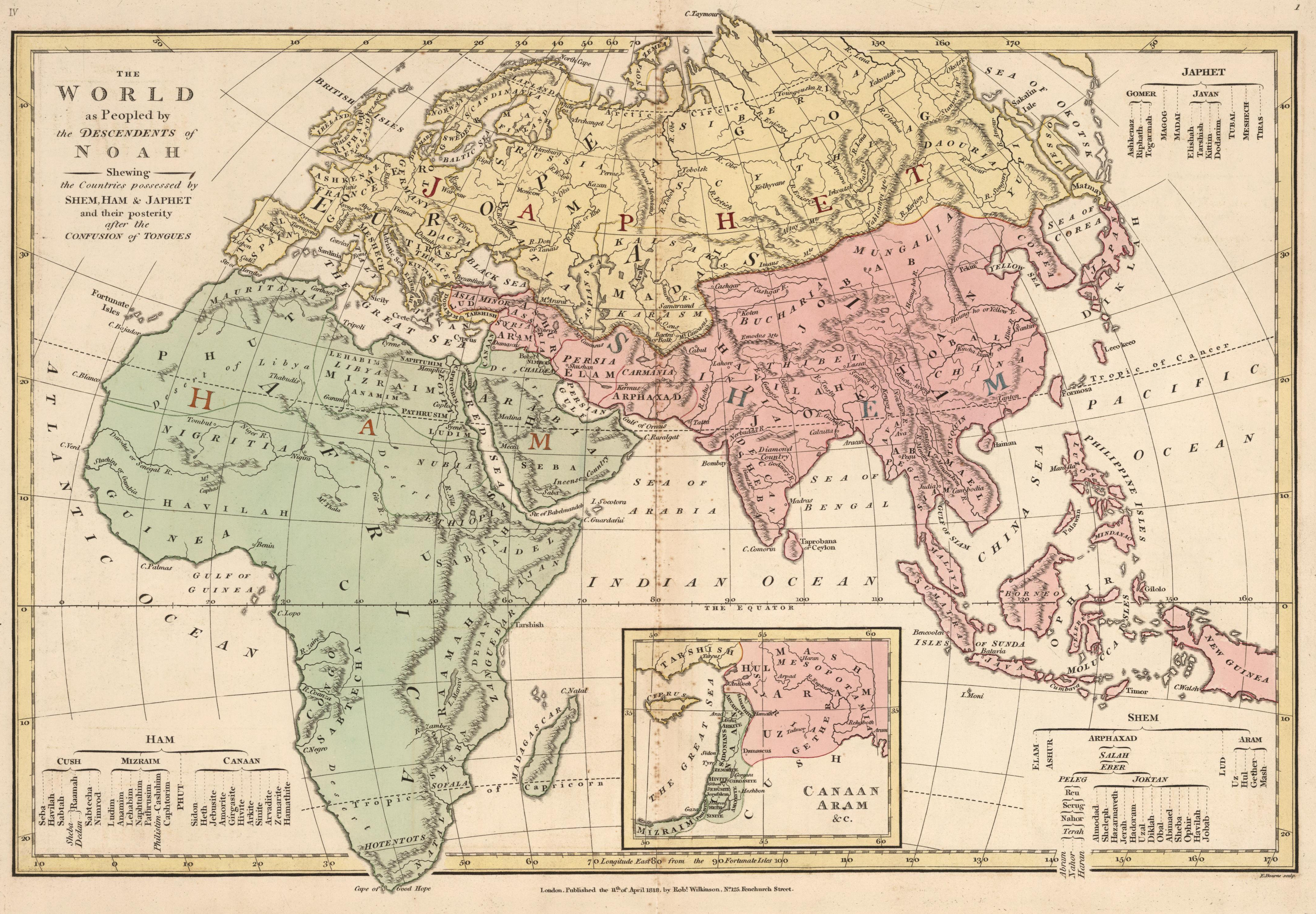
Robert Wilkinson's 1823 map of the descendants of Noah's sons which identifies Meshech with Italy

== See also ==
- Moschia
