= Amaya Arzuaga =

Spanish designer

Amaya Arzuaga (born in Lerma (Burgos), in 1970), is a Spanish designer.

== Early life ==
She studied in the UPM and in 1992 she finished Fashion Design and joined her parents' enterprise, Elipse.

In 1994, she created her own firm. She sells and shows her collections regularly in international fashion fairs like Atmosphère (Paris), Fashion Cotterie (New York), Camera Nazionale della Moda Italiana (Milan), Pasarela Cibeles (Madrid), Passarel·la Gaudí (Barcelona), and London Fashion Week (London). Amaya Arzuaga has more than 200 boutiques in Spain.

== Prizes ==
- Magacines Telva, Elle, Woman
- Empresaria joven de Expansión
- Arte de Vivi
- Primer Premio Cibeles
- Medalla de oro al mérito en las Bellas Artes de 2005
