= Agosti Xaho =

Basque writer (1811–1858)

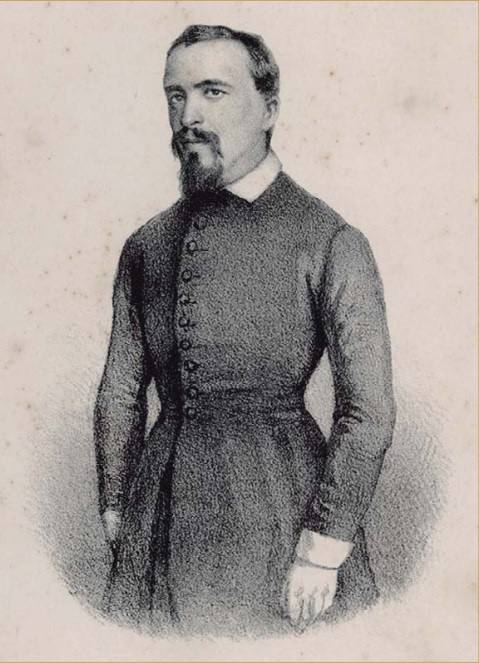
- Born: Agosti Xaho Lagarde; October 10, 1811 Tardets-Sorholus, Basses-Pyrénées, French Empire
- Died: October 23, 1858 (aged 47) Bayonne, Basses-Pyrénées, French Empire
- Resting place: San Leon cemetery (Bayonne)
- Occupation: Politician, journalist and writer
- Language: Basque & French
- Literary movement: Romanticism

Signature
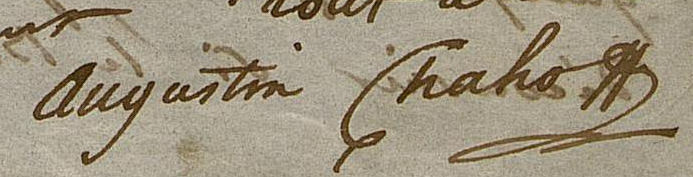

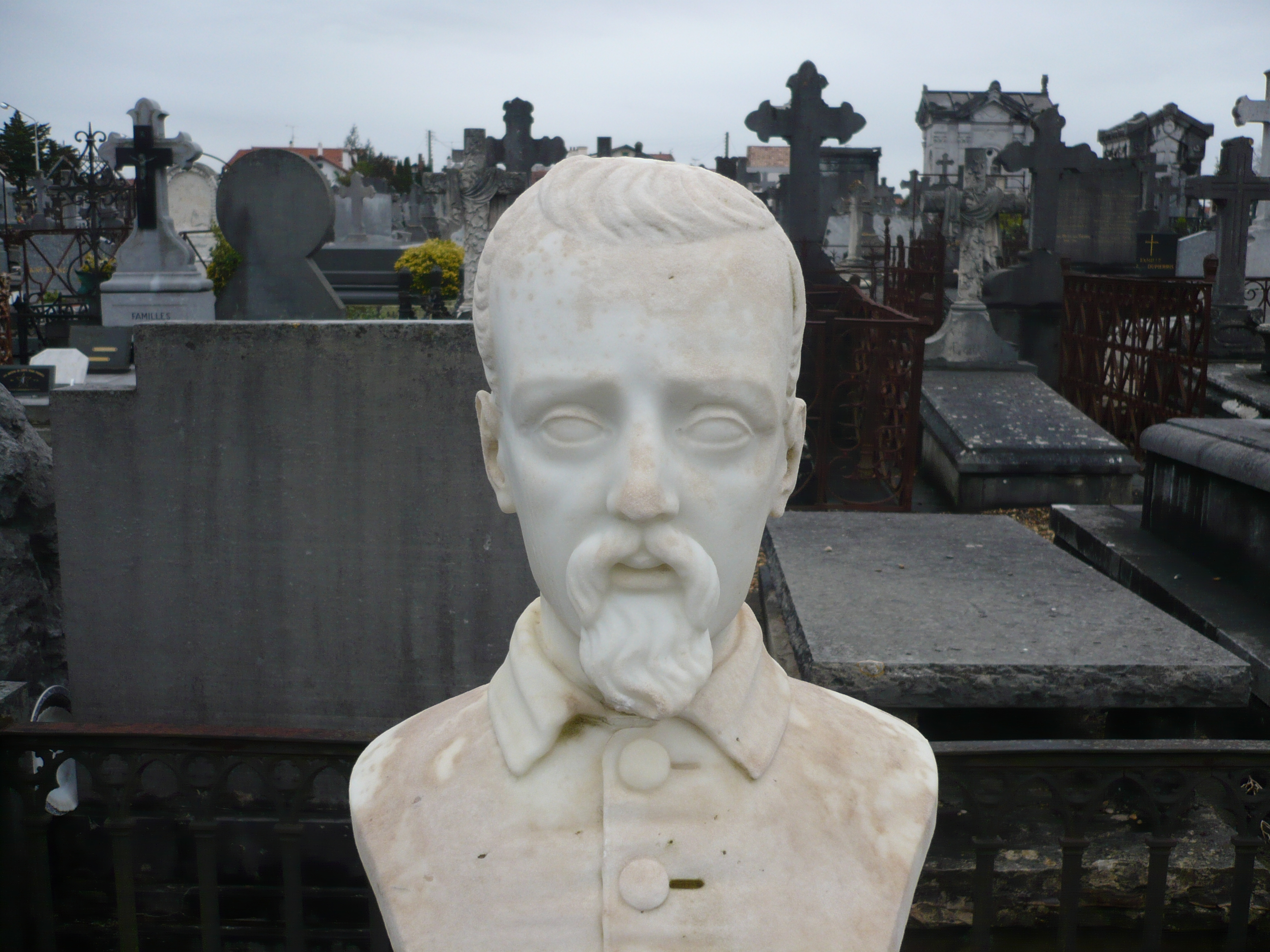
Agosti Xaho

Augustin Chaho in French or Agosti Xaho in Basque was an important Romantic Basque writer. He was born in Tardets (Atharratze in basque), Soule, French Basqueland on 10 October 1811 and died in Bayonne (Baiona in Basque), Labourd 23 October 1858. He is considered a precursor of left-wing Basque patriotism.

It is usually said that he studied in Paris with Charles Nodier. In Paris, he developed his esoteric thought.

He wrote Travel to Navarre during the insurrection of the Basques (1830-1835) (1836, in French, on his experiences in the First Carlist War, which he interprets as an ethnic war of Basques against Spain that would bring about an independent Basque republic.), The Legend of Aitor (in which he invented a national creation myth, that had great acceptance for some time) and Azti-Begia (The Soothsayer's Eye in Souletin Basque).

He was a supporter of republicanism and became a councilor in Bayonne and the Basses-Pyrénées department. He headed the revolution of 1848 in Bayonne. After the Bonapartist coup of 1851, he escaped to Vitoria (Gasteiz in Basque), in Alava, Spanish Basque land.
