= Japhetites =

Outdated grouping of human beings

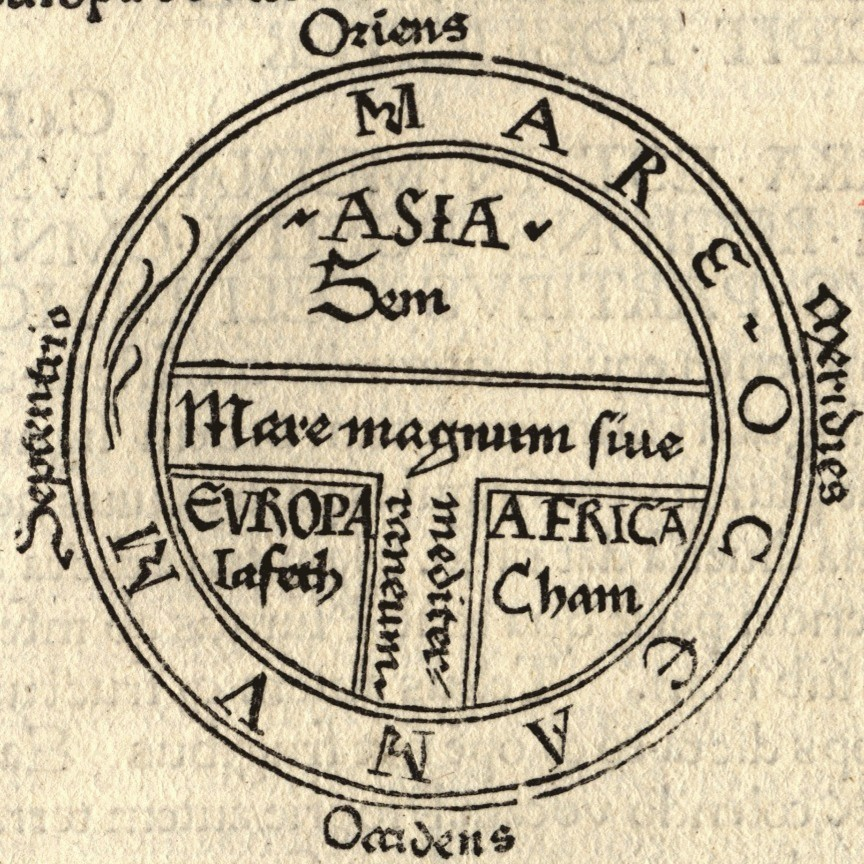
This T and O map, from the first printed version of Isidore's Etymologiae (Augsburg 1472), identifies the three known continents (Asia, Europe, and Africa) as respectively populated by descendants of Sem (Shem), Iafeth (Japheth), and Cham (Ham).

The term Japhetites (sometimes spelled Japhethites; in adjective form Japhetic or Japhethitic) refers to the descendants of Japheth, one of the three sons of Noah in the Book of Genesis. The term was used in ethnological and linguistic writings from the 18th to the 20th centuries as a Biblically derived racial classification for the European peoples, but is now considered obsolete. Medieval ethnographers believed that the world had been divided into three large-scale groupings, corresponding to the three classical continents: the Semitic peoples of Asia, the Hamitic peoples of Africa, and the Japhetic peoples of Europe.

The term has been used in modern times as a designation in physical anthropology, ethnography, and comparative linguistics. In anthropology, it was used in a racial sense for White people (the Caucasian race). In linguistics, it referred to the Indo-European languages. Both of these uses are considered obsolete nowadays. Only the Semitic peoples form a well-defined language family. The Indo-European group is no longer known as "Japhetite", and the Hamitic group is now recognized as paraphyletic within the Afro-Asiatic family.

Among Muslim historians, Japheth is usually regarded as the ancestor of the Gog and Magog tribes, and, at times, of the Turks, Khazars, and Slavs.

== In the Book of Genesis ==
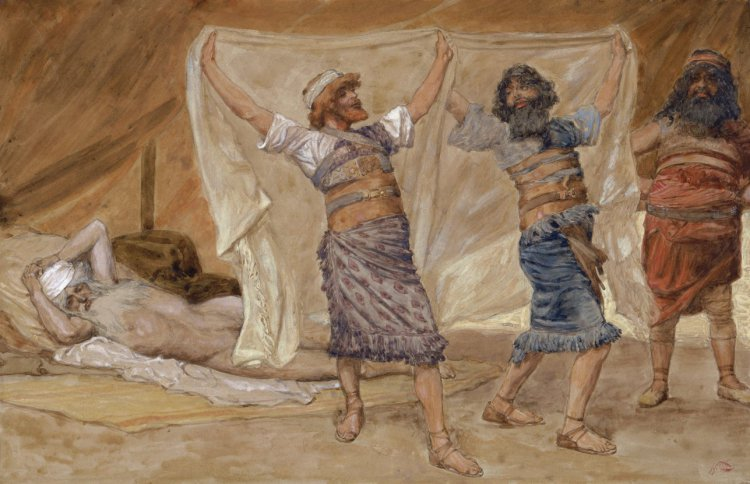
Noah's Drunkenness, painting by James Tissot (between 1896 and 1902), Jewish Museum (Manhattan, New York). The painting depicts Noah lying in his tent; Shem (in purple) and Japheth (blue) are holding up the cloak with their back to Noah; Ham is standing to the side.

Japheth first appears in the Hebrew Bible as one of the three sons of Noah, saved from the Flood through the Ark. In the Book of Genesis, they are always in the order "Shem, Ham, and Japheth" when all three are listed. Genesis 9:24 calls Ham the youngest, and Genesis 10:21 refers ambiguously to Shem as "brother of Japheth the elder", which could mean that either is the eldest. Most modern writers accept Shem–Ham–Japheth as reflecting their birth order, but this is not always the case: Moses and Rachel also appear at the head of such lists despite explicit descriptions of them as younger siblings. However, Japheth is considered to have been the eldest son of Noah in Rabbinic literature.

Following the Flood, Japheth is featured in the story of Noah's drunkenness. Ham sees Noah drunk and naked in his tent and tells his brothers, who then cover their father with a cloak while avoiding the sight; when Noah awakes he curses Canaan, the son of Ham, and blesses Shem and Japheth: "Blessed be the Lord God of Shem and may Canaan be his slave; and may God enlarge Japheth and may he dwell in the tents of Shem, and may Canaan be his slave!" Chapter 10 of Genesis, the Table of Nations, describes how earth was populated by the sons of Noah following the Flood, beginning with the descendants of Japheth:

Japheth
Gomer	Magog	Madai	Javan	Tubal	Meshech	Tiras
Ashkenaz	Riphath	Togarmah	Elishah	Tarshish	Kittim	Dodanim

=== Biblical genealogy ===
Japheth is mentioned as one of the three sons of Noah in the Book of Genesis. The other two sons of Noah, Shem and Ham, are the eponymous ancestors of the Semites and the Hamites, respectively. In the Biblical Table of Nations (Genesis Genesis 10:2–5), seven sons and seven grandsons of Japheth are mentioned:

- Gomer
  - Ashkenaz
  - Riphath
  - Togarmah
- Magog
- Madai
- Javan
  - Elishah
  - Tarshish
  - Kittim
  - Dodanim
- Tubal
- Meshech
- Tiras

The intended ethnic identity of these "descendants of Japheth" is not certain; however, over history, they have been identified by Biblical scholars with various historical nations who were deemed to be descendants of Japheth and his sons — a practice dating back at least to the classical Jewish-Greek encounters. According to the Roman–Jewish historian Flavius Josephus in Antiquities of the Jews, I.VI.122 (Whiston):

Japhet, the son of Noah, had seven sons: they inhabited so, that, beginning at the mountains Taurus and Amanus, they proceeded along Asia, as far as the river Tanais (Don), and along Europe to Cadiz; and settling themselves on the lands which they light upon, which none had inhabited before, they called the nations by their own names.

== Ancient and medieval ethnography ==
=== Ethnogenetic interpretations ===
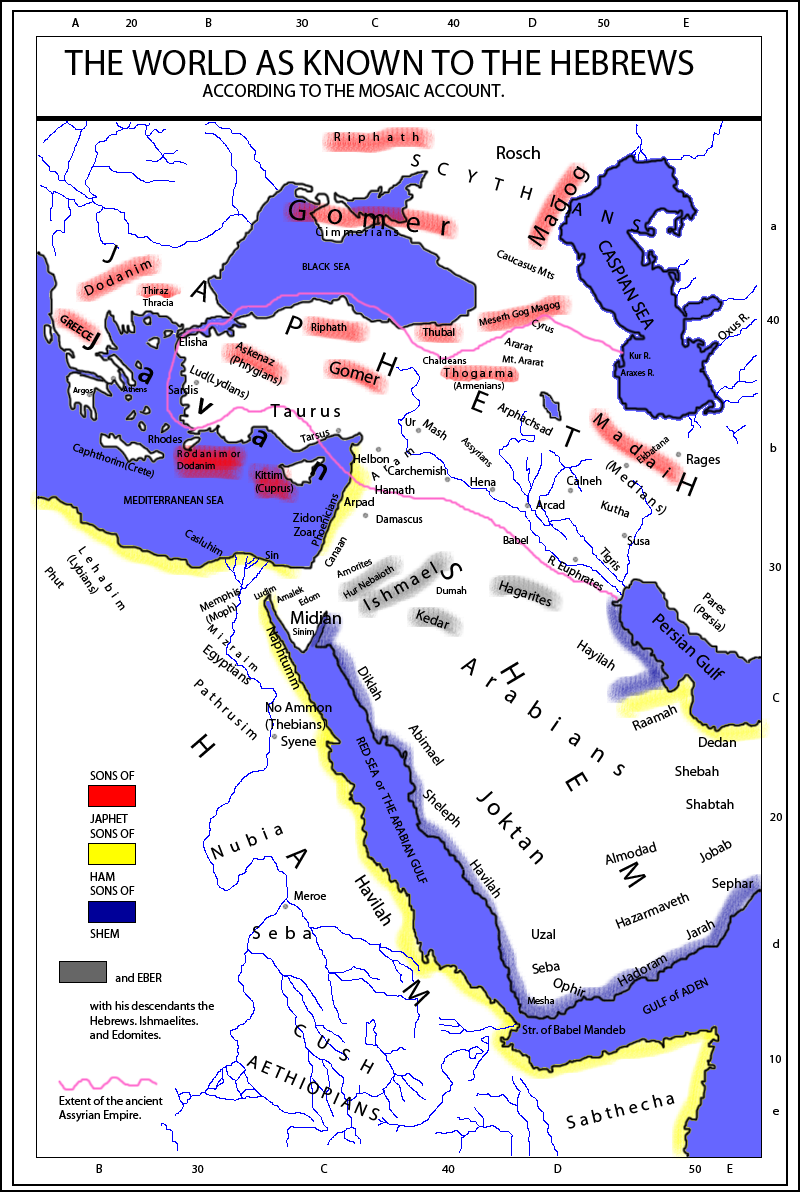
A map showing the distribution of the descendants of Noah according to the Table of Nations. The descendants of Japheth are shown in red.

Japheth (in Hebrew: Yā́p̄eṯ or Yép̄eṯ) may be a transliteration of the Greek Iapetos, the ancestor of the Hellenic peoples. His sons and grandsons associate him with the geographic area comprising the Aegean Sea, Greece, the Caucasus, and Anatolia: Ionia/Javan, Rhodes/Rodanim, Cyprus/Kittim, and other places in the Eastern Mediterranean region. The point of the "blessing of Japheth" seems to be that Japheth (a Greek-descended people) and Shem (the Israelites) would rule jointly over Canaan (Palestine).

From the 19th century until the late 20th century, it was usual to see Japheth as a reference to the Philistines, who shared dominion over Canaan during the pre-monarchic and early monarchic period of Israel and Judah. This view accorded with the understanding of the origin of the Book of Genesis, which was seen as having been composed in stages beginning with the time of King Solomon, when the Philistines still existed (they vanished from history after the Assyrian conquest of Canaan). However, Genesis 10:14 identifies their ancestor as Ham rather than Japheth.

=== Pseudo-Philo ===
An ancient, relatively obscure text known as Pseudo-Philo and thought to have been originally written ca. 70 AD, contains an expanded genealogy that is seemingly garbled from that of the Book of Genesis, and also different from the much later one found in the 17th-century Rabbinic text Sefer haYashar ("Book of Jasher"):

- Sons of Japheth: "Gomer, Magog, and Madai, Nidiazech, Tubal, Mocteras, Cenez, Riphath, and Thogorma, Elisa, Dessin, Cethin, Tudant."
  - Sons of Gomer: Thelez, Lud, Deberlet.
  - Sons of Magog: Cesse, Thipha, Pharuta, Ammiel, Phimei, Goloza, Samanach.
  - Sons of Duden: Sallus, Phelucta Phallita.
  - Sons of Tubal: Phanatonova, Eteva.
  - Sons of Tyras: Maac, Tabel, Ballana, Samplameac, Elaz.
  - Sons of Mellech: Amboradat, Urach, Bosara.
  - Sons of Ascenez: Jubal, Zaraddana, Anac.
  - Sons of Heri: Phuddet, Doad, Dephadzeat, Enoc.
  - Sons of Togorma: Abiud, Saphath, Asapli, Zepthir.
  - Sons of Elisa: Etzaac, Zenez, Mastisa, Rira.
  - Sons of Zepti: Macziel, Temna, Aela, Phinon.
  - Sons of Tessis: Meccul, Loon, Zelataban.
  - Sons of Duodennin: Itheb, Beath, Phenech.

=== Later writers ===
Some of the nations that various later writers (including Jerome and Isidore of Seville, as well as other traditional accounts) have attempted to describe as Japhetites are listed below:

- Gomer: Scythians, Cimmerians, Phrygians, Turks (excluding Avars and Tatars), Bulgarians, Armenians (including most of other related peoples in the Caucasus), Welsh, Picts, Germanic peoples (excluding Norsemen/Scandinavians), Teutons, Celts
- Magog: Goths, Scythians, Norsemen/Scandinavians, Finns, Early Slavs (excluding East Slavs, Bulgarians, and Macedonians), Huns, Magyars (today Hungarians), Irishmen, Armenians (including most of other related peoples in the Caucasus)
- Madai: Mitanni, Mannai, Medes, more generally Iranians
- Javan: Ancient Greeks, Ionians, Tartessians
- Tubal: Tabali, Circassians, Irishmen, Georgians (including most of other related peoples in the Caucasus), Illyrians, Italics (excluding the Latins who are of Etruscan origins), Basques, Iberians
- Meshech: Early Slavs (including Russians), Phrygians (possibly), Moschoi, Meskheti, Georgians, Armenians, Illyrians, Irishmen
- Tiras: Thracians, Etruscans, Romanians

== Renaissance to Early Modern ethnography ==
=== Book of Jasher ===
The Sefer haYashar ("Book of Jasher"), written by Talmudic rabbis in the 17th century (first printed in 1625), ostensibly based on an earlier edition of 1552, provides some new names for Japheth's grandchildren:

- Gomer (sons were Ashkenaz, Riphath and Togarmah)
- Magog (sons were Elichanaf and Lubal)
- Madai (sons were Achon, Zeelo, Chazoni and Lot)
- Javan (sons were Elishah, Tarshish, Kittim and Dodanim)
- Tubal (sons were Ariphi, Kesed and Taari)
- Meshech (sons were Dedon, Zaron and Shebashni)
- Tiras (sons were Benib, Gera, Lupirion and Gilak)

== Anthropology ==
The term "Caucasian" as a racial label for Europeans derives in part from the assumption that the tribe of Japheth developed its distinctive racial characteristics in the Caucasus area, having migrated there from Mount Ararat before populating the European continent. The Georgian historian and linguist Ivane Javakhishvili associated Japheth's sons with certain ancient tribes, called Tubals (Tabals, in Greek: Tibarenoi) and Meshechs (Meshekhs/Mosokhs, in Greek: Moschoi), who claimed to represent non-Indo-European and non-Semitic, possibly "Proto-Iberian" tribes that inhabited Anatolia during the 3rd-1st millennia BC. This theory influenced the use of the term Japhetic in the linguistic theories of Nikolai Marr (see below).

During the 18th and 19th centuries, the Biblical statement attributed to Noah that "God shall enlarge Japheth" (Genesis 9:27) was used by some Christian preachers as a justification for the "enlargement" of European territories through imperialism, which they interpreted as part of God's plan for the world. The subjugation of Africans was similarly justified by the curse of Ham.

== Linguistics ==
The term Japhetic was also applied by philologists such as William Jones, Rasmus Rask, and others to what is now known as the Indo-European language group. The term was used in a different sense by the Soviet linguist Nicholas Marr, in his Japhetic theory, which was intended to demonstrate that the languages of the Caucasus formed part of a once-widespread pre-Indo-European language group.

== See also ==
- Aryan
- Gog and Magog
- Hephthalites
- Indo-Scythians
- Proto-Indo-Europeans
