= Caucas =

Supposed ancestor of Nakh peoples according to Georgian chronicles

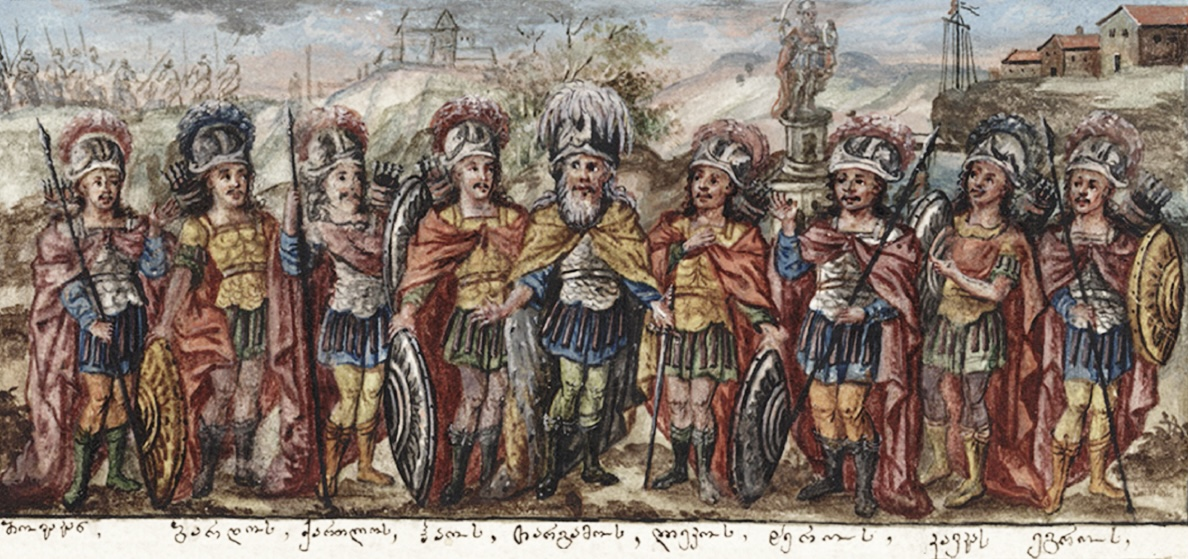
Thargamos and his sons. The order of the figures from left to right is: Movakan, Bardos, Kartlos, Hayk, Lekos, Thargamos, Caucas, Egros. An opening folio of the Georgian Chronicles (Vakhtangiseuli redaction), 1700s.

Caucas or Kavkasos (Georgian: კავკასოსი, romanized: k'avk'asosi) was the supposed ancestor of Vainakh peoples (Chechens and Ingush) according to The Georgian Chronicles. His story is narrated in the compilation of the medieval Georgian chronicles, Kartlis Tskhovreba, taken down from oral tradition by Leonti Mroveli in the 11th century. The legend has it that he was a son of Targamos and, thus, brother of Hayk (known to be ancestor of Armenian people), Movakos, Lekos (referred to as the ancestor of Lezgic peoples), Heros, Kartlos (known to be ancestor of Georgian people), and Egros.

Caucas' descendant Dzurdzuk is said to be the ancestor of the Chechens and Ingush.

== Genealogy ==
Noah
Japheth
Gomer
Togarmah
Caucas

== Descendants ==
- Ingush and Chechens (Vainakhs)
