= Baath mac Magog =

Figure in Irish legendary history

Clan or Tribe
- Clan/Tribe: The Gaedil

Name spelling variants
- Names & Epithets: Baath, Baoth, Bathath.

Ancestry/Family
- Grandfather: Japheth
- Father: Magog
- Siblings: Ibath, Barachan, Emoth and Aithechta. Possibly Eochu
- Children: Fénius Farsaid
- Date of Birth: Circa 2900BC. (Shortly after the Biblical Flood. AFM Timeline).

Baath or Baath mac Magog is a figure in Irish legendary history. He was a son of Magog, son of Japheth, the progenitor of the Scythians, son of Noah, and the father of Fénius Farsaid, according to a version "M" of Lebor Gabála Érenn, also known as the Great Book of Lecan. He is described as being from Scythia, and the Goths, or the Gaedil. According to the same version of the story, he had four brothers, Ibath, Barachan, Emoth, and Aithechta. But the story further states that "Feinius Farrsaid was son of Baath, son of Ibath, son of Gomer, and son of Iafeth".

There are several competing genealogies in the sources deriving Fénius, Baath, the Milesians, etc., either from Magog, Gomer, or sometimes even Javan. In some versions Baath or Ibath occupy the same position as Rifath Scot (Riphath son of Gomer), while in others Fénius himself is treated as interchangeable with Rifath Scot. The earliest traditions regarding Fénius and Baath in Auraicept na n-Eces (ca. 7th century) seem to combine figures with exploits placed at the Tower of Babel and at the Exodus of Moses.

Much of this is also reflected in the Historia Brittonum (9th century) which includes similar tales and also derives the ancestry of Europeans, in part, through Baath son of Jobath son of Joham or Javan son of Japheth.

In the much earlier account of Pseudo-Philo (c. 70), the sons of Javan's son Dodanim are called Itheb, Beath, and Phenech; the last of these is made the prince of the Japhethites at the time of the Tower of Babel.
