= Hebrew culture =

Hebrew culture may refer to:

- Canaanite culture
- Jewish culture

== See also ==
- Semitic culture
