= Kartlos =

Legendary father of the Georgian people

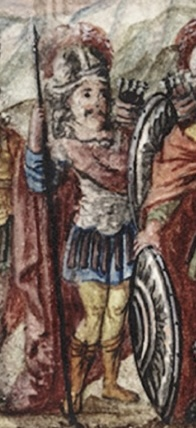
Kartlos from The Georgian Chronicles (King Vakhtang VI redaction), 1700s.

Kartlos (Georgian: ქართლოსი) is the legendary progenitor and "father of all Georgians" in the Georgian mythology, more specifically of the nation of Kartli, known as the Kingdom of Iberia in the classical antiquity. He was a descendant of Japheth, second son of Targamos (i.e. Togarmah), the common ancestor of the Caucasians, and Kartlos, himself becoming the patriarch of the Georgians. According to the myth, he controlled a large territory in the Caucasus and participated, with his brothers, in a war to free himself from the domination of a giant and Titan king Nebrot (i.e. Nimrod).

While Kartlos is only a mythological figure, his story has been explained by modern historiography for many reasons, whether political, ethnological, or religious. Even though, Kartlos is not styled as mepe (i.e. king), his activities and powers anticipate those of the first pre-Christian Georgian kings. According to a chronicle, Kartlos would establish Kartli prior to the foundation of Rome, a polity, that will dominate and define the national Georgian experience, tracing its ascendancy in the early Hellenistic age, soon after the death of Alexander the Great.

The Moktsevay Kartlisay chronicle and an early medieval Georgian Church clerics, notably, Arsen of Iqalto, would actively ignore and omit Kartlos, alongside Ancient Hebrews.

== Legend ==
The myth of Kartlos is part of the Judeo-Christian mythology, a series of medieval legends that attempts to find a connection between the ancestors of the Georgians and biblical characters from an Old Testament. The medieval text of The Georgian Chronicles, first mentions him around the 11th century, leading modern historiography to attribute the myth of Kartlos and his family to Leonti Mroveli, although, the tradition might be dated to c. 800. The historian Giorgi Melikishvili dates the myth back to the early 8th century.

The legend of Kartlos is unique to Georgian mythology, while that of his father, Targamos, features widely in medieval Jewish mythology. The letters of the Khazar king Joseph ben Aaron (10th century), the Josippon (10th century), the Chronicles of Jerahmeel (14th century) and the Sefer haYashar (11th century) all mention Targamos (under the name Togarmah) as well as his sons, but do not relate it to the peoples of the Caucasus and do not cite Kartlos. The Georgian historian Ivane Javakhishvili theorizes that the creation of the myth of Kartlos and his family was only a political tool of the Georgian rulers to justify the Georgian unification.

According to historian Korneli Kekelidze, the association of Kartlos with Togarma is inspired by Hippolytus of Rome, who makes him the ancestor alongside the Armenians from the 3rd century. Nikoloz Berdzenishvili, for his part, explains the legend of Kartlos as an attempt by the Georgian chronicler to continue the myth of Togarma started by Moses of Khorene in the 5th century and who made his character the master of all Caucasians and the lands between the Black Sea and the Caspian Sea, as well as the ancestor of the Armenians, and their progenitor Haos (i.e. Hayk).

W.E.D. Allen theorized that the myth of Kartlos was directly linked to the ancient cult of Armazi, the principal god of the pre-Christian Georgian pantheon, as well as the modern veneration of Saint George.

== Family ==
Kartlos is the second son of Targamos and one of his “several wives”. He has a multitude of brothers and sisters. His father, who is claimed to be a great-grandson of Japheth, took possession of the Caucasus following the collapse of the Tower of Babel who divided his territories between his eight principal sons. Each becomes the ancestor of different Caucasian peoples. Kartlos had seven brothers: Haos (patriarch of the Armenians), Bardos and Movakan (patriarchs of the Caucasian Albanians), Lekos (patriarch of the Lezgins), Heros (patriarch of the Heretians), Kavkas (patriarch of the North Caucasian tribes) and Egros (patriarch of the Egrisians).

Kartlos would unite his people to become their chieftain and founded the country of Kartli. He would later have sons: Mtskhetos, Gardabos, Kakhos, Kukhos, Gachios, Uphlos, Odzrkhos, Javakhos, the respective eponymous founders of Mtskheta, Gardabani, Kakheti, Kukheti, Gachiani, Uplistsikhe, Odzrkhe, and Javakheti.

== Genealogy ==
Noah
Japheth
Gomer
Targamos
Kartlos

== Bibliography ==
- Rapp, S. H. (2003) Studies in Medieval Georgian Historiography, Early Texts and Eurasian Contexts, Peeters Publishers, ISBN 978-90-429-1318-9
- W.E.D. Allen (1932) A History of the Georgian People, London, Routledge, ISBN 978-0-7100-6959-7
- Brosset, M. (1849) Histoire de la Géorgie - 1re Partie, Saint-Petersburg, Imprimerie de l'Académie impériale des Sciences
- Akhvlediani, G. (1990) "ქართლის ცხოვრების" ფოლკლორული წყაროები [Folklore sources of The Georgian Chronicles], Tbilisi, Sakartvelo Publishing, ISBN 978-5-529-00504-0
