= Ashkenaz =

Biblical figure

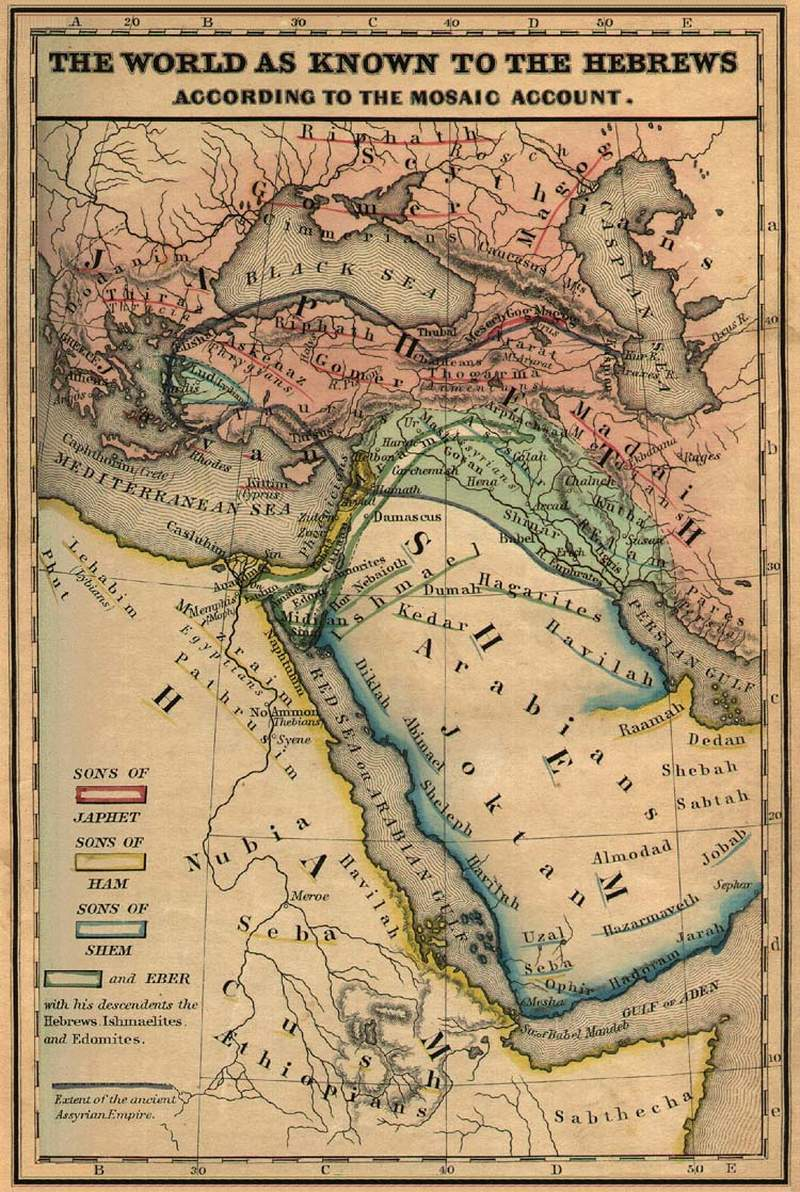
Ashkenaz is shown in Phrygia in this 1854 map of "The World as known to the Hebrews" (Lyman Coleman, Historical Textbook and Atlas of Biblical Geography)

Ashkenaz (Hebrew: אַשְׁכְּנָז ʾAškənāz) in the Hebrew Bible is one of the descendants of Noah. Ashkenaz is the first son of Gomer, and a Japhetic patriarch in the Table of Nations. In rabbinic literature, the descendants of Ashkenaz were first associated with the Scythian cultures, then later with the Slavic territories, and, from the 11th century onwards, with Germany and northern Europe, or the Indo-European people, in a manner similar to Tzarfat or Sefarad.

His name is related to the Assyrian Aškūza (Aškuzai, Iškuzai), the Scythians who expelled the Gimirri (Gimirrāi) from the Armenian highland of the Upper Euphrates area.

== Hebrew Bible ==
In the genealogies of the Hebrew Bible, Ashkenaz (Hebrew: אַשְׁכְּנַז, ’Aškənaz; Greek: Ἀσχανάζ, romanized: Askhanáz) was a descendant of Noah. He was the first son of Gomer and brother of Riphath and Togarmah (Genesis 10:3, 1 Chronicles 1:6), with Gomer being the grandson of Noah through Japheth.

In Jeremiah 51:27, a kingdom of Ashkenaz was to be called together with Ararat and Minni against Babylon, which reads:

Set ye up a standard in the land, blow the trumpet among the nations, prepare the nations against her [i.e. Babylon], call together against her the kingdoms of Ararat, Minni, and Ashchenaz; appoint a captain against her; cause the horses to come up as the rough caterpillars.

According to the Encyclopaedia Biblica, "Ashkenaz must have been one of the migratory peoples which in the time of Esar-haddon, burst upon the northern provinces of Asia Minor, and upon Armenia. One branch of this great migration appears to have reached Lake Urumiyeh; for in the revolt which Esar-haddon chastised, the Mannai, who lived to the SW of that lake, sought the help of Ispakai 'of the land of Asguza,' a name (originally perhaps Asgunza) which the skepticism of Dillmann need not hinder us from identifying with Ashkenaz, and from considering as that of a horde from the north, of Indo-Germanic origin, which settled on the south of Lake Urumiyeh."

== Medieval reception ==
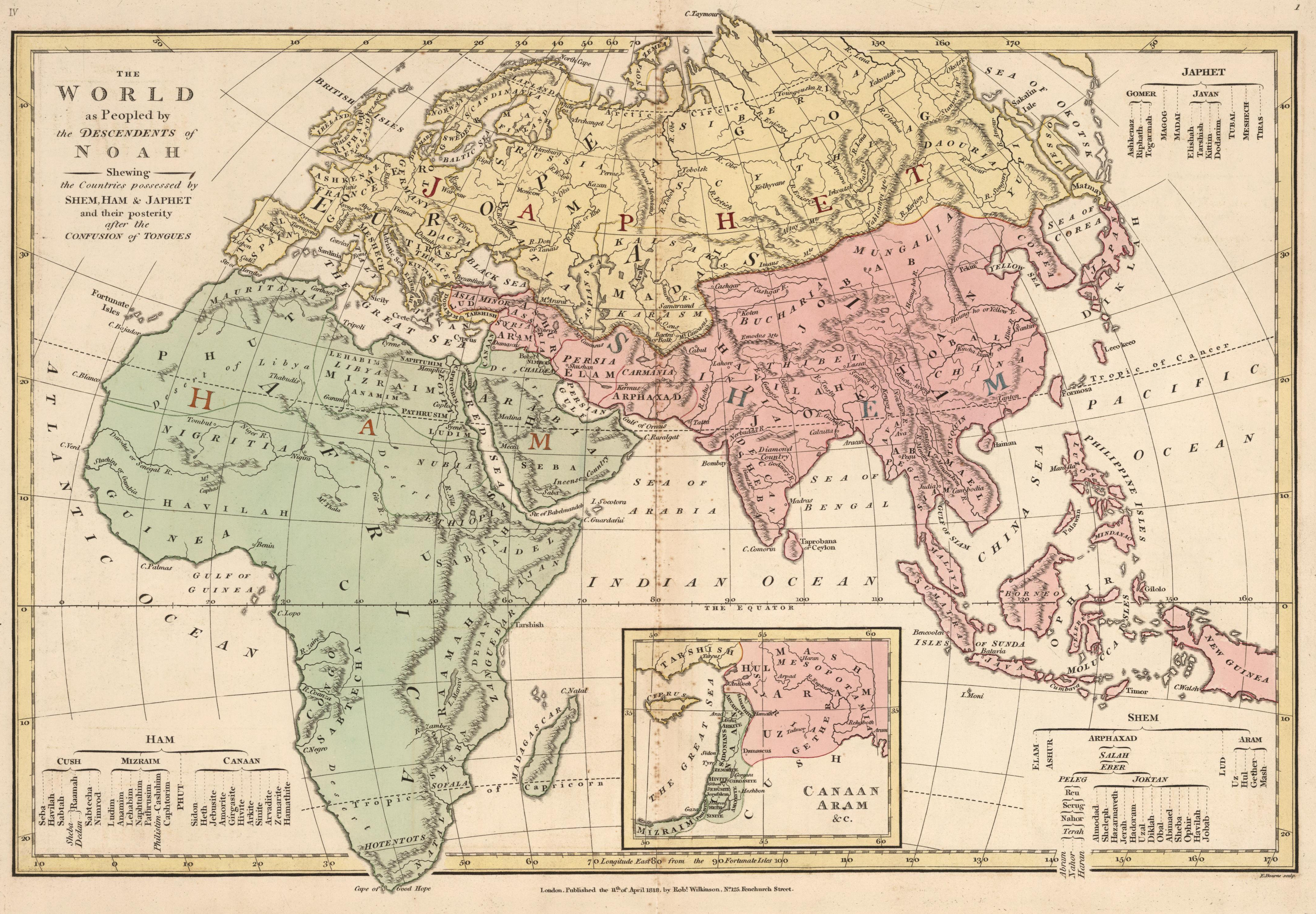
Robert Wilkinson's 1823 map of the descendants of Noah's sons, showing Ashkenaz as France

The Karaite philologist David ben Abraham al-Fāsi, writing around the year 1000 CE, identified Ashkenaz as the ancestor of the Khazars.

=== Rabbinic Judaism ===
In rabbinic literature, the kingdom of Ashkenaz was first associated with the Scythian region, then later with the Slavic territories, and, from the 11th century onwards, with northern Europe and Germany. The region of Ashkenaz was centred on the Rhineland and the Palatinate (notably Worms and Speyer), in what is now the westernmost part of Germany. Its geographic extent did not coincide with the German Christian principalities of the time, and it included northern France.

How the name of Ashkenaz came to be associated in the rabbinic literature with the Rhineland is a subject of speculation.

In rabbinic literature from the 11th century, Ashkenaz was considered the ruler of a kingdom in the North and of the Northern and Germanic people. (See below.)

=== Ashkenazi Jews ===
Sometime in the Early Middle Ages, the Jews east of France came to be called by the name Ashkenazim, in conformity with the custom of designating areas of Jewish settlement with biblical names, Spain as Sepharad (Obadiah 1:20), France as Tzarfat (1 Kings 17:9), and Bohemia as Canaan. By the High Middle Ages, Talmudic commentators like Rashi began to use Ashkenaz/Eretz Ashkenaz to designate Germany, earlier known as Loter, where, especially in the Rhineland communities of Speyer, Worms, and Mainz, the most important Jewish communities arose. Rashi uses leshon Ashkenaz (Ashkenazi language) to describe the German language, and Byzantium and Syrian Jewish letters referred to the Crusaders as Ashkenazim.

Given the close links between the Jewish communities of France and Germany following the Carolingian unification, the term Ashkenazi came to refer to both the Jews of medieval Germany and France. Ashkenazi Jewish culture later spread in the 16th century into Eastern Europe, where their rite replaced that of existing Jewish communities whom some scholars believe to have been larger in demographics than the Ashkenazi Jews themselves, and then to all parts of the world with the migrations of Jews who identified as "Ashkenazi Jews".

=== Armenian tradition ===
Armenian authors usually identified Togarmah, Ashkenaz's younger brother, as the ancestor of the Armenians. Less frequently, the Armenian nation's ancestry was traced to Ashkenaz. In the earliest known original work written in Armenian, the Life of Mashtots by Koriun, the Armenian nation is called "Ask’anazean ", i.e., "descended from Ashkenaz". The Life of Mashtots begins with these words:

I had been thinking of the God-given script of the nation descended from Ashkenaz and of the land of Armenia, as to when or at what time it was bestowed […]

The Armenian catholicos and historian, Hovhannes Draskhanakerttsi (10th century), probably trying to reconcile the varying appellations tracing Armenian descent from either Togarmah or Ashkenaz, writes:

The sixth son was Tiras from whom were born our very own Ashkenaz [Ask'anaz] and Togarmah [T'orgom] who named the country that he possessed Thrace after himself, as well as Chittim [K'itiim] who brought under his sway the Macedonians. 7. The sons of Tiras were Ashkenaz, from whom descended the Sarmatians, Riphath, whence the Sauromatians [Soramatk'], and Togarmah, who according to Jeremiah subjugated the Ashkenazian army and called it the House of Togarmah; for at first Ashkenaz had named our people after himself in accord with the law of seniority, as we shall explain in its proper place.

Because of this tradition, Askanaz is a male given name still used today by Armenians.

=== German royal genealogy ===
In 1498, a monk named Annio da Viterbo published fragments known as "Pseudo-Berossus", now considered a forgery, claiming that Babylonian records had shown that Noah had more sons than the three sons of his listed in the Bible. Specifically, Tuiscon or Tuisto is given as the fourth son of Noah, who had been the first ruler of Scythia and Germany following the dispersion of peoples, with him being succeeded by his son Mannus as the second king.

Later historians (e.g., Johannes Aventinus and Johann Hübner) managed to furnish numerous further details, including the assertion by James Anderson in the early 18th century that this Tuiscon was in fact none other than the biblical Ashkenaz, son of Gomer. James Anderson's 1732 tome Royal genealogies reports a significant number of antiquarian or mythographic traditions regarding Askenaz as the first king of ancient Germany, for example the following entry:

Askenaz, or Askanes, called by Aventinus Tuisco the Giant, and by others Tuisto or Tuizo (whom Aventinus makes the 4th son of Noah, and that he was born after the flood, but without authority) was sent by Noah into Europe, after the flood 131 years, with 20 Captains, and made a settlement near the Tanais, on the West coast of the Euxin sea (by some called Asken from him) and there founded the kingdom of the Germans and the Sarmatians ... when Askenaz himself was 24 years old, for he lived above 200 years, and reigned 176.

In the vocables of Saxony and Hessia, there are some villages of the name Askenaz, and from him the Jews call the Germans Askenaz, but in the Saxonic and Italian, they are called Tuiscones, from Tuisco his other name. In the 25th year of his reign, he partitioned the kingdom into Toparchies, Tetrarchies, and Governments, and brought colonies from diverse parts to increase it. He built the city Duisburg, made a body of laws in verse, and invented letters, which Kadmos later imitated, for the Greek and High Dutch are alike in many words.

The 20 captains or dukes that came with Askenaz are: Sarmata, from whom Sarmatia; Dacus or Danus – Dania or Denmark; Geta from whom the Getae; Gotha from whom the Goths; Tibiscus, people on the river Tibiscus; Mocia – Mysia; Phrygus or Brigus – Phrygia; Thynus – Bithynia; Dalmata – Dalmatia; Jader – Jadera Colonia; Albanus from whom Albania; Zavus – the river Save; Pannus – Pannonia; Salon – the town Sale, Azalus – the Azali; Hister – Istria; Adulas, Dietas, Ibalus – people that of old dwelt between the rivers Oenus and Rhenus; Epirus, from whom Epirus.

Askenaz had a brother called Scytha (say the Germans) the father of the Scythians, for which the Germans have of old been called Scythians too (very justly, for they came mostly from old Scythia) and Germany had several ancient names; for that part next to the Euxin was called Scythia, and the country of the Getes, but the parts east of the Vistule or Weyssel were called Sarmatia Europaea, and westward it was called Gallia, Celtica, Allemania, Francia and Teutonia; for old Germany comprehended the greater part of Europe; and those called Gauls were all old Germans; who by ancient authors were called Celts, Gauls and Galatians, which is confirmed by the historians Strabo and Aventinus, and by Alstedius in his Chronology, p. 201 etc. Askenaz, or Tuisco, after his death, was worshipped as the ambassador and interpreter of the gods, and from thence called the first German Mercury, from Tuitseben to interpret.

In the 19th century, the German theologian August Wilhelm Knobel again equated Ashkenaz with the Germans, deriving the name of the Aesir from Ashkenaz.
