= Semitic people =

Obsolete racial category

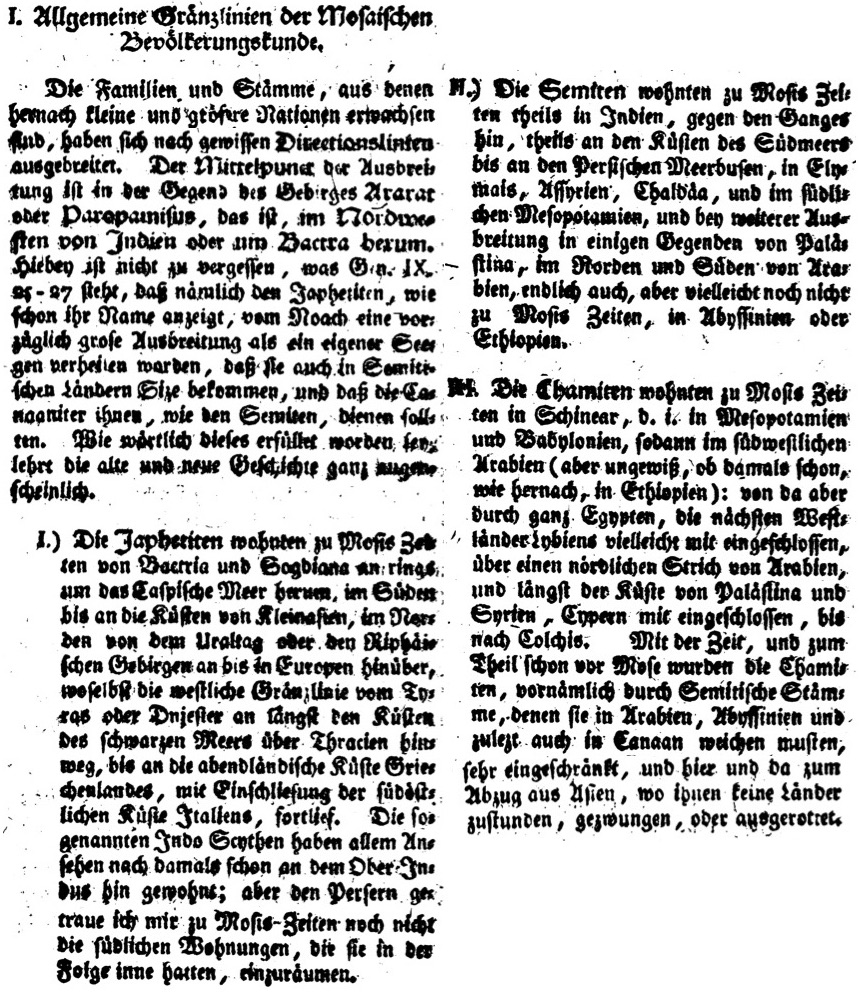
In his 1771 book Introduction to Synchronic Universal History (German: Einleitung in die Synchronistische Universalhistorie) Johann Christoph Gatterer depicts the first historical ethnology of the world separated into the biblical sons of Noah: Semites, Hamites, and Japhetites. Gatterer's view is that modern history has shown the truth of the biblical prediction of Japhetite supremacy (Genesis 9:25–27). Click the image for a transcription of the text.

Semitic people or Semites is an obsolete term for an ethnic, cultural or racial group formerly used in connection with ancient and modern peoples of the Middle East including Akkadians (Assyrians and Babylonians), Arabs, Ammonites, Arameans, Canaanites, Edomites, Israelites, Jews, Judahites, Moabites, Phoenicians, Samaritans, and others. Use of the terminology is now largely confined to the field of linguistics in reference to "Semitic languages". However, the term is sometimes still used colloquially as a shorthand for Semitic-speaking peoples.

Coined in the 1770s by members of the Göttingen school of history, this biblical terminology for race was derived from Shem (שֵׁם), one of the three sons of Noah in the Book of Genesis, and roughly corresponded to the Hebrews and related groups. In this worldview, the other two sons of Noah corresponded to the remaining races; Hamites referred to dark-skinned African peoples, and Japhetites referred to the Medes, Persians, Greeks, and other peoples who were later called Aryans.

== Antisemitism ==
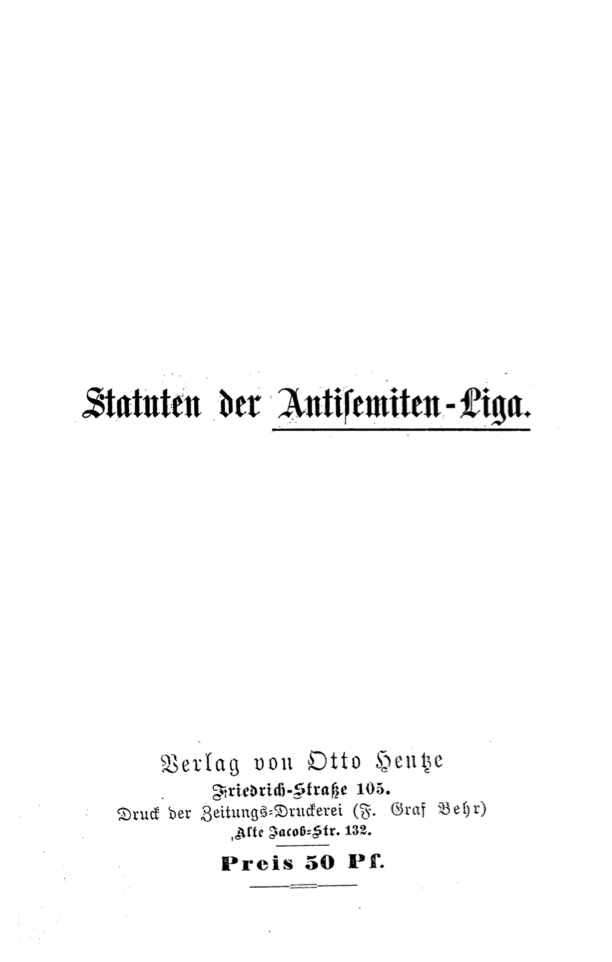
1879 statute of the Antisemitic League, the organization which first popularized the term

German historian Christoph Meiners, supporter of the polygenist theory of human origins, became a favorite intellectual ancestor of the Nazis. In his "binary [greater] racial scheme" of superior Caucasians and inferior Mongoloids, Meiners did not include Jews as Caucasians and ascribed to them a "permanently degenerate nature". Other members of the Göttingen school of history would make the addition of Negroids.

Meiners resented the French Revolution for leading to French Jewish emancipation and threatening the Germans' supposed rightful place in a racial hierarchy in which they were assessed as superior in all domains. According to Meiners, Germans had inherited more advantageous physical, intellectual and moral characteristics, including purer blood, from their ancestors, but the decadence of eighteenth-century life had caused them to decline. In 1772 he became extraordinary professor, and in 1775 full professor, of Weltweisheit, also at the University of Göttingen, when over the course of tenures he had the opportunity to join the Göttingen school of history.

The terms "anti-Semite" or "antisemitism" came by a circuitous route to refer more narrowly to anyone who was hostile or discriminatory towards Jews in particular.

Anthropologists of the 19th century such as Ernest Renan readily aligned linguistic groupings with ethnicity and culture, appealing to anecdote, science and folklore in their efforts to define racial character. Moritz Steinschneider, in his periodical of Jewish letters Hamaskir (3 (Berlin 1860), 16), discusses an article by Heymann Steinthal criticising Renan's article "New Considerations on the General Character of the Semitic Peoples, In Particular Their Tendency to Monotheism". Renan had acknowledged the importance of the ancient civilisations of Mesopotamia, Israel etc. but called the Semitic races inferior to the Aryan for their monotheism, which he held to arise from their supposed lustful, violent, unscrupulous and selfish racial instincts. Steinthal summed up these predispositions as "Semitism", and so Steinschneider characterised Renan's ideas as "anti-Semitic prejudice".

In 1879, the German journalist Wilhelm Marr began the politicisation of the term by speaking of a struggle between Jews and Germans in a pamphlet called Der Weg zum Siege des Germanenthums über das Judenthum ("The Way to Victory of Germanism over Judaism"). He accused the Jews of being liberals, a people without roots who had Judaized Germans beyond salvation. In 1879, Marr's adherents founded the "League for Anti-Semitism", which concerned itself entirely with anti-Jewish political action.

Characterizations of "Semite" as having little to no value on the socially constructed racial spectrum have been made since at least the 1930s. Identification as an antisemite was politically advantageous in Europe at least during the late 19th century. For example, Karl Lueger, the popular mayor of fin de siècle Vienna, skillfully exploited antisemitism as a way of channeling public discontent to his political advantage.

== See also ==
- Ancient Semitic-speaking peoples
- Pan-Semitism
- Generations of Noah
- Hamites
- Japhetites

== Bibliography ==
- Anidjar, Gil (2008). Semites: Race, Religion, Literature. Stanford University Press. ISBN 978-0-8047-5694-5.
- Liverani, Mario (January 1995). "Semites". In Geoffrey W. Bromiley (ed.). The International Standard Bible Encyclopedia. Wm. B. Eerdmans Publishing. pp. 387–392. ISBN 978-0-8028-3784-4.
