= Madai =

Biblical character

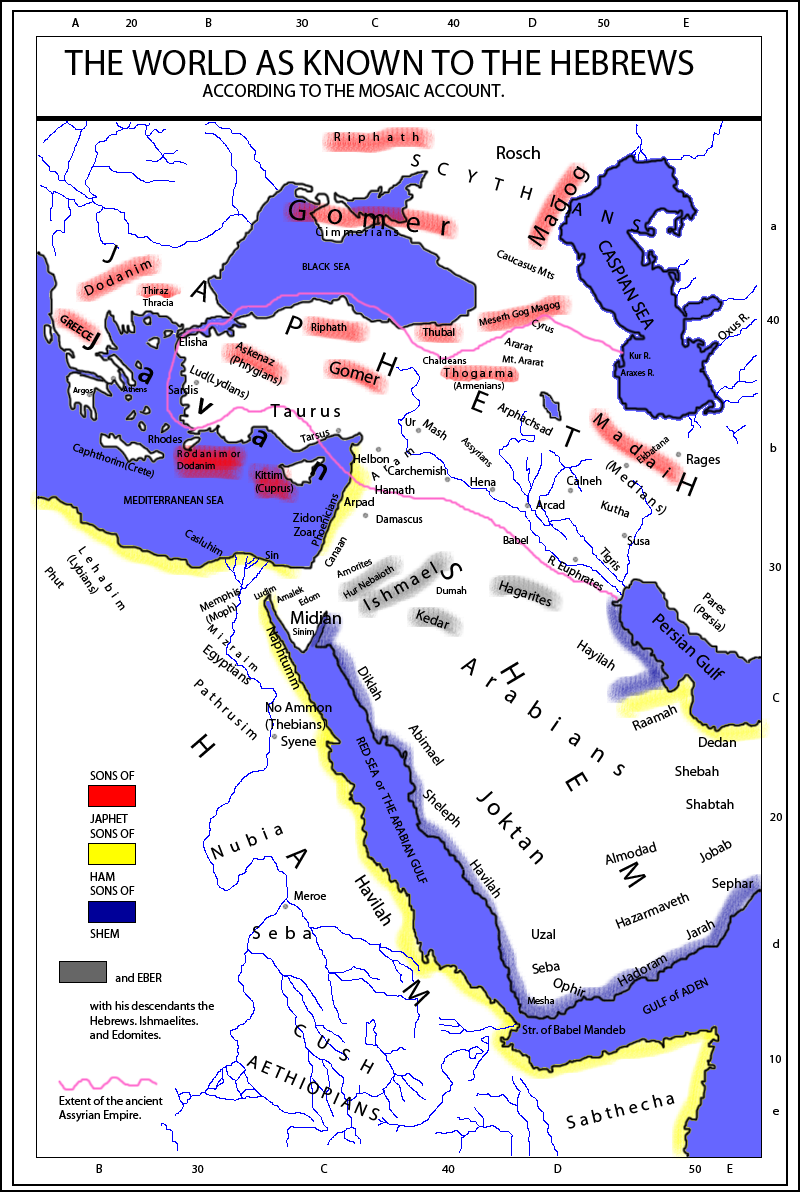

Madai (Hebrew: מָדַי, pronounced [maˈdaj]; Greek: Μηδος, [mɛːˈdos]) is a son of Japheth and one of the 16 grandsons of Noah in the Book of Genesis of the Hebrew Bible.

== Associated nations ==
=== Medes and related Iranian nations ===
Biblical scholars have generally identified Madai with the Iranian Medes of much later records. The Medes, reckoned to be his offspring by Josephus and most subsequent writers, were also known as Madai, including in both Assyrian and Hebrew sources.

Also linked with Madai is the Iranian city of Hamadan.

The Kurds, Balochs, Azeris (before Turkification) still maintain traditions of descent from Madai.

=== Others ===
Some scholars in more modern times have also proposed connections with various earlier nations, such as Mitanni, Matiene, and Mannai.

== In the Book of Jubilees ==
According to the Book of Jubilees (10:35-36), Madai had married a daughter of Shem, and preferred to live among Shem's descendants, rather than dwell in his allotted inheritance beyond the Black Sea (seemingly corresponding to the British Isles), so he begged his brothers-in-law, Elam, Asshur and Arphaxad, until he finally received from them the land that was named after him, Media.

Another line in Jubilees (8:5) states that a daughter of Madai named Milcah (Aramaic: Melkâ) married Cainan, who is an ancestor of Abraham also mentioned in the Septuagint version of Genesis and in the Gospel of Luke (3:36).

== Purported link with Medos and Medea ==
Medos (Μηδος), and his mother Medea, were also reckoned to be the ancestors of the Medes in classical Greek mythical history. Christian scholars have proposed linking Hebrew Madai and Greek Medos since at least the time of Isidore of Seville [Etym 9.2.28], ca. 600 AD.
