= Japheth =

Biblical figure, son of Noah

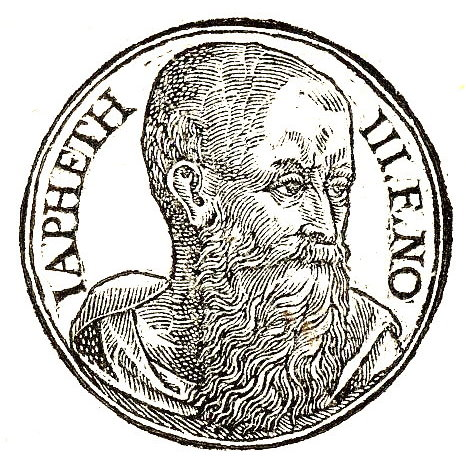
- "Japhet third son of Noah", as depicted in Promptuarii Iconum Insigniorum (c. 1553)
- Children: Gomer; Magog; Madai; Javan; Tubal; Meshech; Tiras
- Parent: Noah
- Relatives: Shem and Ham (Genesis) (brothers)

Japheth (/ˈdʒeɪfɛθ/; Biblical Hebrew: יֶפֶת, romanized: Yép̄eṯ, or in pausa, יָפֶת, Yā́p̄eṯ; Greek: Ἰάφεθ, romanized: Iápheth; Latin: Iapetus, Iafeth, Iapheth, or Iaphethus; Arabic: يافث, romanized: Yāfiṯ) was one of the three sons of Noah in the Book of Genesis. In the narrative of the Hebrew Bible, he plays a role in the story of Noah's drunkenness and the curse of Ham, and subsequently in the Table of Nations, he is named as the ancestor of the peoples of the Aegean Sea, Anatolia, Caucasus, Greece, and elsewhere in Eurasia. In medieval and early modern European tradition, he was considered to be the progenitor of the European peoples.

== Etymology ==
The meaning of the name Japheth (יפת, y-p̄-t) is disputed. There are two possible sources to the meaning of the name, according to the Jewish Encyclopedia:

- From the Aramaic root פתה (p-t-h), meaning "to extend". In this case, the name would mean "may He (i.e., God) extend", according to the interpretation of Rashi.
- From the Biblical Hebrew root יפה (y-p-h, lit. 'beauty' or 'pretty'), in which case the name would mean "beautiful".

== In the Book of Genesis ==
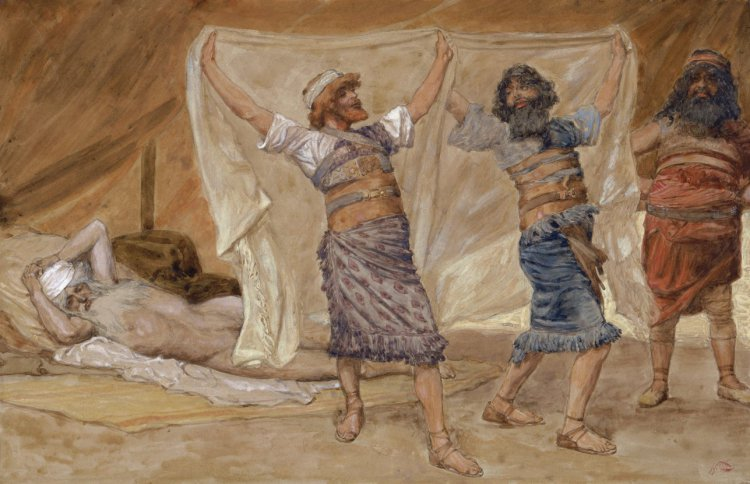
Noah's Drunkenness, painting by James Tissot (between 1896 and 1902), Jewish Museum (Manhattan, New York). The painting depicts Noah lying in his tent; Shem (in Tyrian purple) and Japheth (in blue) are holding up the cloak with their back to Noah; Ham is standing to the side.

Japheth first appears in the Hebrew Bible as one of the three sons of Noah, saved from the Flood through the Ark. In the Book of Genesis, they are always in the order "Shem (שֵׁם, Šēm), Ham (חָם, Ḥām), and Japheth" when all three are listed. Genesis 9:24 calls Ham the youngest, and Genesis 10:21 refers ambiguously to Shem as "brother of Japheth the elder", which could mean that either is the eldest. Most modern writers accept Shem–Ham–Japheth as reflecting their birth order, but this is not always the case: Moses and Rachel also appear at the head of such lists despite explicit descriptions of them as younger siblings. However, Japheth is considered to have been the eldest son of Noah in the Rabbinic literature.

Following the Flood, Japheth is featured in the story of Noah's drunkenness. Ham sees Noah drunk and naked in his tent and tells his brothers, who then cover their father with a cloak while avoiding the sight; when Noah wakes, he curses Canaan, the son of Ham, and blesses Shem and Japheth:

^{25}He said,
"Cursed be Canaan;
The lowest of slaves
Shall he be to his brothers."
^{26}And he said,
"Blessed be the ETERNAL,
The God of Shem;
Let Canaan be a slave to them.
^{27}May God enlarge Japheth,
And let him dwell in the tents of Shem;
And let Canaan be a slave to them."

— THE JPS TANAKH: Gender-Sensitive Edition

Chapter 10 of Genesis, the Table of Nations, describes how the earth was populated by the sons of Noah following the Flood, beginning with the descendants of Japheth:

Japheth
Gomer	Magog	Madai	Javan	Tubal	Meshech	Tiras
Ashkenaz	Riphath	Togarmah	Elishah	Tarshish	Kittim	Dodanim

== Ethnogenetic interpretations ==
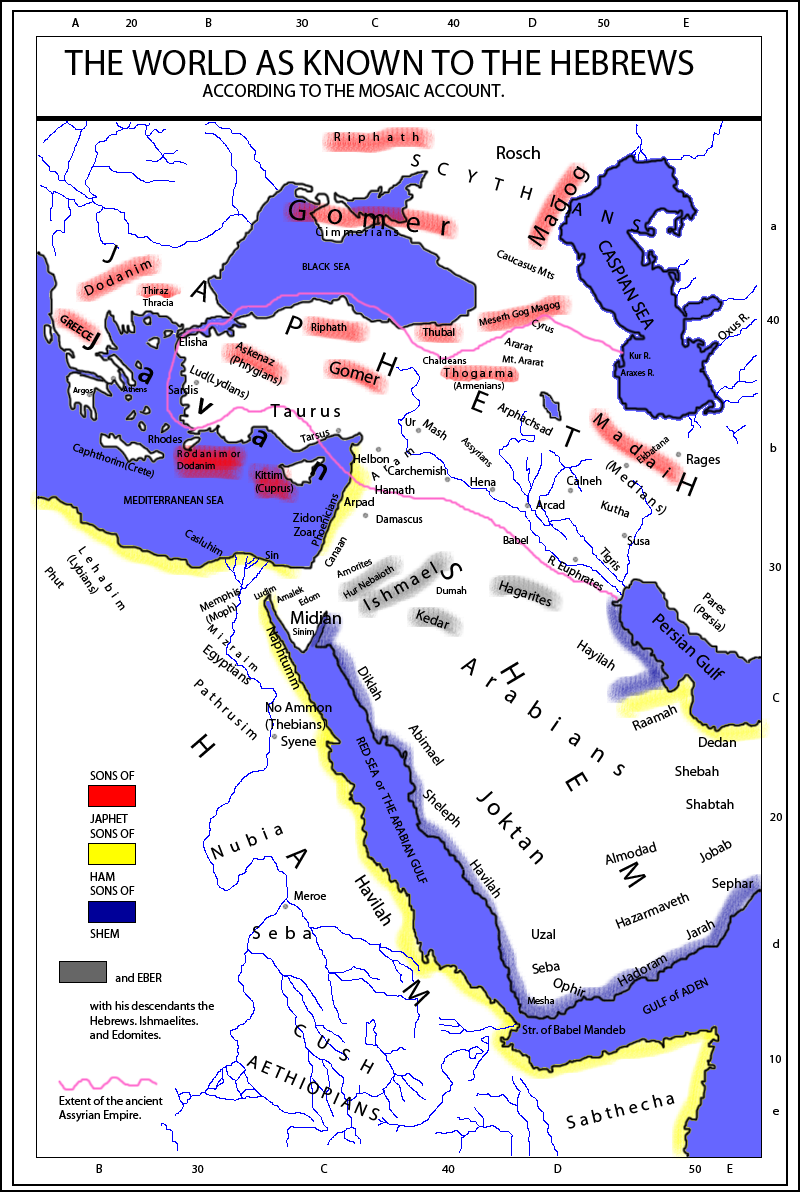
A map showing the distribution of the descendants of Noah according to the Table of Nations. The descendants of Japheth are shown in red.

"Japheth" (Yā́p̄eṯ or Yép̄eṯ in the original Biblical Hebrew) may be a transliteration of the Greek "Iapetus", the mythological ancestor of the Hellenic peoples. His sons and grandsons associate him with the geographic area comprising the Aegean Sea, Greece, the Caucasus, and Anatolia, including Ionia (Javan), Rhodes (Rodanim), Cyprus (Kittim), and other places in the Eastern Mediterranean region. The point of the "blessing of Japheth" of Genesis 9:27 seems to be that "Japheth" (i.e., Greek-descended people) and "Shem" (i.e., the Israelites) would rule jointly over Canaan (Palestine).

From the 19th century until the late 20th century, it was usual to see "Japheth" as a reference to the Philistines, who shared dominion over Canaan during the pre-monarchic and early monarchic period of Israel and Judah. This view accorded with the understanding of the origin of the Book of Genesis, which was seen as having been composed in stages beginning with the time of King Solomon, when the Philistines still existed. The Philistines vanished from the historical record c. the 5th century BCE, after the Assyrian conquest of Canaan). However, Genesis 10:14 identifies their ancestor as Ham rather than Japheth.

== Biblical descendants ==
Geographic identifications of the sons of Noah, according to Flavius Josephus (c. 100 CE); Japheth's sons shown in red.

In the Hebrew Bible, Japheth is ascribed seven sons: Gomer (גֹמֶר, gōmer), Magog (מָגוֹג, māgōg), Tiras (תִירָס, tîrās), Javan (יָוָן, yāwān), Meshech (מֶשֶׁךְ, mešek), Tubal (תֻבָל, tubāl), and Madai (מָדַי, mādai). According to the Roman Jewish historian Flavius Josephus, the author of the historigraphical Antiquities of the Jews:

Japhet, the son of Noah, had seven sons: they inhabited so, that, beginning at the mountains Taurus and Amanus, they proceeded along Asia, as far as the river Tansis, and along Europe to Cádiz; and settling themselves on the lands which they light upon, which none had inhabited before, they called the nations by their own names.

The midrashic Sefer haYashar (ספר הישר, Sēfer ha‑Yāshār, 'Book of the Upright'), not to be confused with the since-lost Book of Jasher mentioned in Joshua 10:13 and 2 Samuel 1:18, attributed some new names to Japheth's grandchildren that are not found in the Hebrew Bible and provided a much more detailed genealogy. In Jewish tradition, Abraham's wife Keturah is sometimes considered a descendant of Japheth.

=== Europeans ===
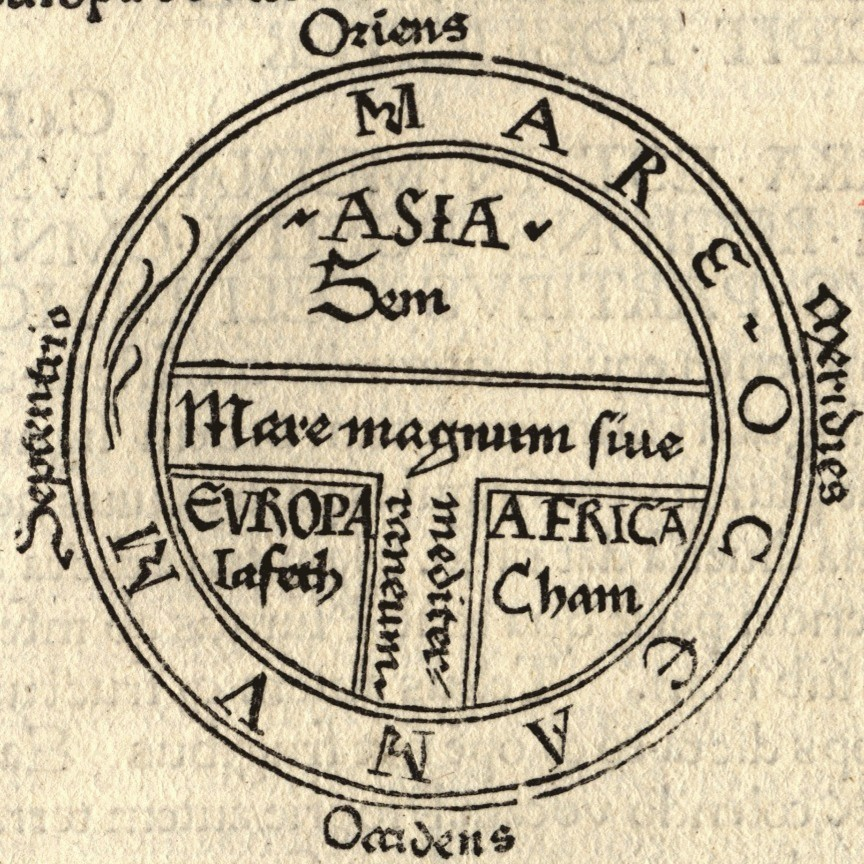
This T and O map, from the first printed version of Isidore of Seville's Etymologiae (Augsburg 1472), identifies the three known continents (Asia, Europe, and Africa) as populated by descendants of Sem (Shem), Iafeth (Japheth), and Cham (Ham), respectively.

In the 7th century CE, Hispano–Roman archbishop and scholar Isidore of Seville wrote his encyclopedic-historical treatise titled Etymologiae, in which he traces the origins of most of the Ethnic groups in Europe back to Japheth. Scholars in almost every European nation continued to repeat and develop Isidore of Seville's assertion of descent from Noah through Japheth into the 19th century. Additionally, William Shakespeare's play Henry IV, Part II contains a wry comment about people who claim to be related to royal families. Prince Hal notes of such people:

"...they will be kin to us, or they will fetch it from Japhet." (II.ii 117-18)

The Georgian historian and linguist Ivane Javakhishvili associated Japheth's sons with certain ancient tribes, called Tabals (Ancient Greek: Τιβαρηνοί, romanized: tibarenoí, lit. 'Tibarenians') and Meshechs (Μόσχοι, móskhoi, 'calves'), who claimed to represent non-Indo-European and non-Semitic, possibly proto-Iberian tribes that inhabited Anatolia throughout the 3rd to 1st millennia BCE. In the Polish tradition of Sarmatism, the Sarmatians, an Iranian people, were said to be descended from Japheth, son of Noah, enabling the Polish nobility to believe that its ancestry could be traced directly to Noah. In Scotland, histories tracing the Scottish people to Japheth were published as late as George Chalmers's well-received Caledonia, published in 3 volumes from 1807 to 1824.

== In the Islamic tradition ==
Japheth (in Arabic, Yāfith) is not mentioned by name in the Quran but is referred to indirectly in the narrative of Noah. Muslim exegesis of the Quran, however, names all of Noah's sons, and these include Japheth. In identifying Japheth's descendants, Muslim exegesis mostly agrees with the biblical tradition.

In the Islamic tradition, he is usually regarded as the ancestor of the tribes of Gog and Magog. Islamic tradition also tends to identify the descendants of Japheth as including the Turks, Khazars, Chinese, Mongols, and Slavs. According to Abu al-Ghazi Bahadur, who wrote the 17th-century ethnographic treatise Shajara-i Tarākima (Genealogy of the Turkmen), the descendants of Ham migrated to Africa, Shem to the Iran, and Japheth went to the banks of the Itil and Yaik rivers, and had eight sons named Turk, Khazar, Saqlab, Rus, Ming, Chin, Kemeri, and Tarikh. As Japheth was dying, he appointed Turk, his firstborn son, as his successor.

According to the 18th-century Hui Muslim writer Liu Zhi, after Noah's flood, Japheth inherited China as the eastern portion of the Earth, Shem inherited Arabia as the middle portion, and Ham inherited Europe as the western portion. Some Muslim traditions narrate that 36 languages of the world could be traced back to Japheth.

== In popular culture ==
Japheth is a major character in the second act of Stephen Schwartz's musical, Children of Eden. In this rendition, Japheth has fallen in love with the family servant, Yonah (created entirely for the show). He wants to bring her onto the Ark to allow her to survive the flood, but Noah forbids this as Father (i.e., God) is trying to wipe the world free of those descended from Cain. Yonah is descended from Cain, despite her good heart and love from the family. Japheth secretly brings her aboard, and Ham and Shem eventually discover her. Japheth defends her from Noah and is about to kill Shem in his rage. Yonah stops and calms him, and Noah decides to let her stay. The flood passes, and the brothers all depart for different regions to populate the world, but Japheth and Yonah decide they want to search for Eden. Noah blesses their journey by passing the staff of Adam to Japheth. Smaller casts of the show usually have the actor who portrays Cain also portray Japheth.

== See also ==
- Caucasian race
- Groups claiming affiliation with Israelites
- Japhetic theory
- Japhetites
- Iapetos
- Proto-Indo-Europeans
- Sons of Noah
- Wives aboard the Ark
- Jami' al-tawarikh
