= Togarmah =

Biblical figure

Togarmah תֹּגַרְמָה
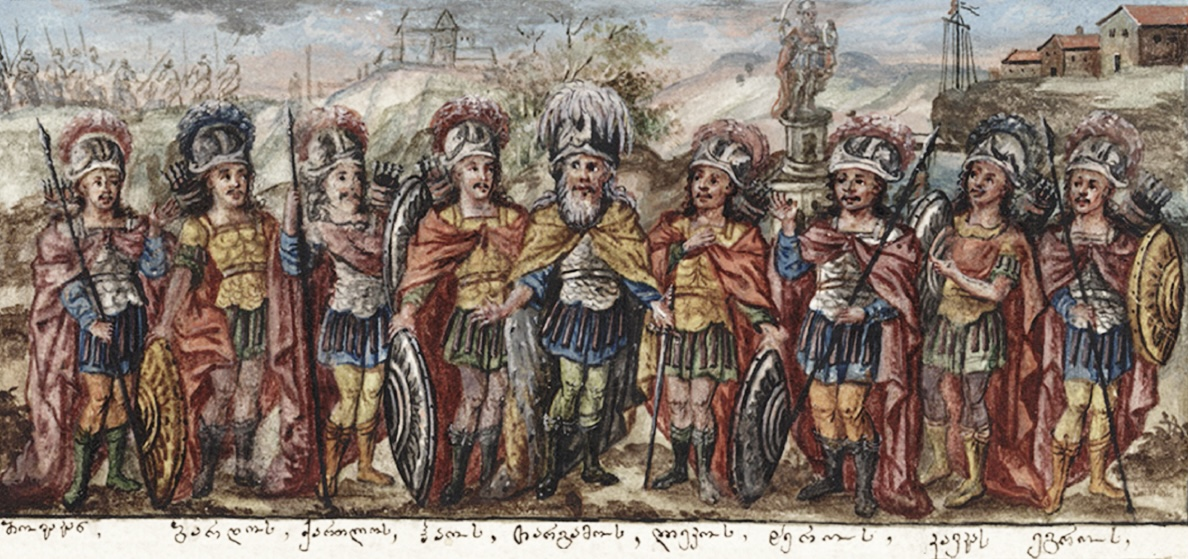
- Thargamos and his sons. The order of the figures from left to right is: Movakan, Bardos, Kartlos, Hayk, Thargamos, Lekos, Heros, Caucas, Egros. An opening folio of the Georgian Chronicles (Vakhtang VI redaction), 1700s.
- Parents: ... (see the complete family tree); Lamech (great great grandfather); Noah (great grandfather); Japheth (grandfather); Gomer (father)

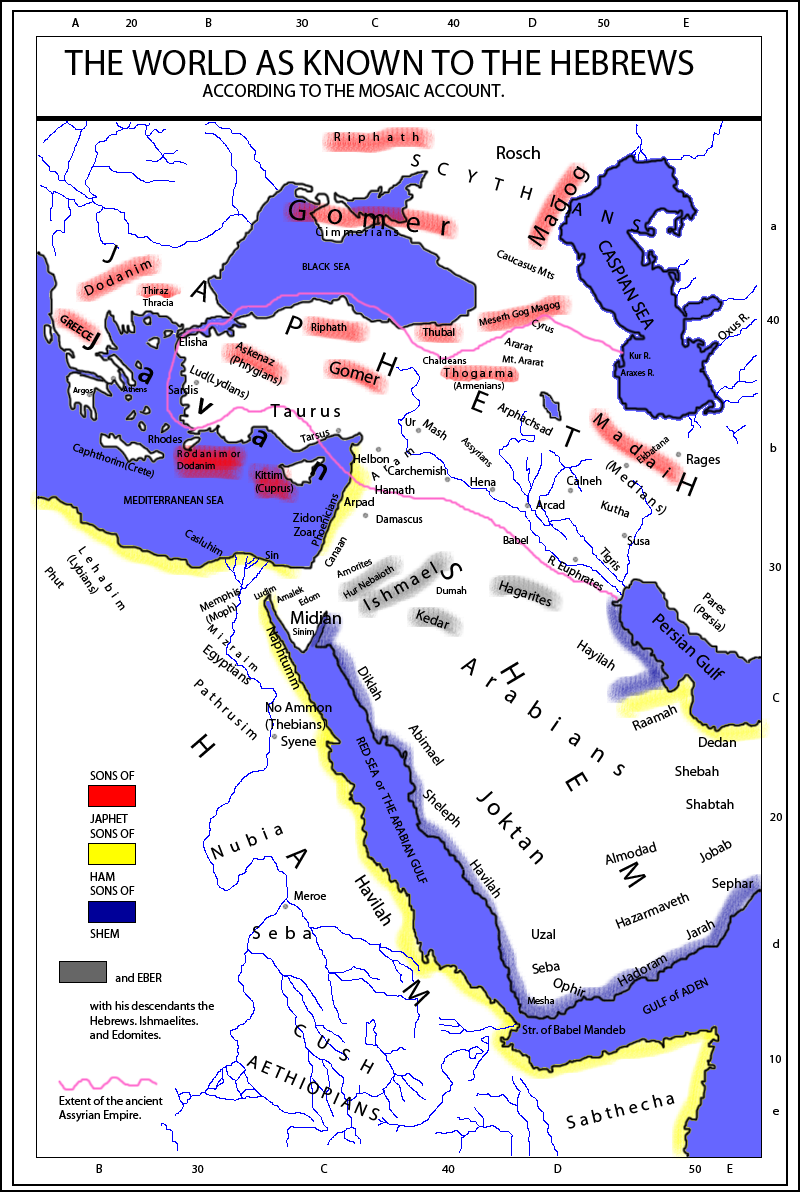
Red: Son of Japhet, Yellow: Son of Ham. Blue: Son of Shem

Togarmah (Hebrew: תֹּגַרְמָה, romanized: Toḡarmā, Armenian: Թորգոմ, romanized: Torgom, Georgian: თარგამოსი, romanized: Targamosi) is a figure in the Generations of Noah in the Book of Genesis that represents the peoples known to the Hebrews. Togarmah is among the descendants of Japheth and is thought to represent some people located in Anatolia. Medieval sources claimed that Togarmah was the legendary ancestor of several ethnic groups in the Caucasus, including Armenians and Georgians. (Note: The legendary ancestor of Georgians was also stated to be Tubal.)

== Biblical attestations and historical geography ==
Togarmah is listed in Genesis 10:3 as the third son of Gomer, and grandson of Japheth, brother of Ashkenaz and Riphath. The name is again mentioned in the Book of Ezekiel as a nation from the "far north". Ezekiel 38:6 mentions Togarmah together with Tubal as supplying soldiers to the army of Gog. Ezekiel 27:14 mentions Togarmah together with Tubal, Javan and Meshech as supplying horses to the Tyrians.

Most scholars identify Togarmah with the capital city called Tegarama by the Hittites and Til-Garimmu by the Assyrians. O.R. Gurney placed Tegarama in Southeast Anatolia.

=== Later traditions ===
Several later ethnological traditions have claimed Togarmah as the legendary ancestor of various peoples located in western Asia and the Caucasus. Jewish historian Flavius Josephus (37 – c. 100 AD) and the Christian theologians Jerome (c. 347 – 420 AD) and Isidore of Seville (c. 560 – 636 AD) regarded Togarmah as the father of the Phrygians. Several ancient Christian authors, including Saint Hippolytus (c. 170-c. 236 AD), Eusebius of Caesarea (c. 263 – c. 339 AD), and bishop Theodoret (c. 393 – c. 457 AD), regarded him as a father of Armenians. Medieval Jewish traditions linked him with several Turkic peoples including the Khazars.

=== Armenian and Georgian traditions ===
Another Togarmah, this one being the son of both Tiras and Gomer, is mentioned by Armenian Moses of Chorene (c. 480) and Georgian Leonti Mroveli who regarded Togarmah as the founder of their nations along with other Caucasian peoples.

According to Moses of Chorene's History of Armenia and to Leonti Mroveli's medieval Georgian Chronicles, "Thargamos" was thought to have lived in Babylon, before he received the "land between two Seas and two Mountains" (i.e. the Caucasus) in his possession. He then settled near Mount Ararat and divided his land among his sons:

1. Hayk (Հայկ) - first son of Thargamos, inherited Mount Ararat and founded the Armenian nation.
2. Kartlos (ქართლოსი) - settled in north-east from Ararat, founder of Kartli (Sa'kartvelo) who united other brothers and founded the Georgian nation.
3. Bardоs (ancestor of the Aghbanians/Aghuanians/Aghuans)
4. Movkan (ancestors of the Movkans)
5. Lekos ancestors of the "Lek" tribe of the North Caucasus.
6. Heros (Herans) - settled in the eastern part of Ararat
7. Caucas (Kovkases) - settled beyond the Caucasus Range, ancestor of the Ingush and Chechens.
8. Egros (Egers) - settled between the Black Sea and Likhi Range (Western Georgia)

=== Jewish traditions ===
Togarmah was linked to several medieval Turkic peoples by Jewish traditions. The Khazar ruler Joseph ben Aaron (c. 960) writes in his letters:

You ask us also in your epistle: "Of what people, of what family, and of what tribe are you?" Know that we are descended from Japhet, through his son Togarmah. I have found in the genealogical books of my ancestors that Togarmah had ten sons.

He then goes on to enumerate ten names, which Korobkin (1998) reconstructs as:

1. Agyor (Orkhon Uyghurs?)
2. Tiros (or scribal error for **Twrq, meaning Göktürks?)
3. Ouvar (Avars)
4. Ugin (or Uguz, possibly Oghuz Turks)
5. Bisal (Pechenegs?)
6. Tarna (cf. a Tarniach people who fled to the Avars from the Turks)
7. Khazar (Khazars)
8. Zanor (or Janur) (cf. a Zabender people who fled to the Avars from the Turks)
9. Balnod (likely scribal error for Bulgar, meaning Bulgars)
10. Savir (Sabirs)

The anonymous Jewish author of the medieval historical chronicle Josippon lists the ten sons of Togarmas as follows:

1. Kwzar (כוזר) (the Khazars)
2. Pyṣynq (פיצינק) (the Pechenegs)
3. ˀln (אלן) (the Alans)
4. Bwlgr (בולגר) (the Bulgars)
5. Knbynˀ (כנבינא) (Kanbina? or a scribal error for Kotzager, a people who fled to the Avars from the Turks, or Kutrigurs; cf. Kánnai's uncertain reconstruction Kotrakh)
6. Ṭwrq (טורק) (possibly the Göktürks)
7. Bwz (בוז) (Flusser corrects this to כוז **Kwz for Ghuzz "Oghuzes", east of the Khazars)
8. Zkwk (זכוך) (Zakhukh? or זיכוס **Zykws = Zikhūs, meaning the Northwest Caucasian Zygii?) (or a Zabender people who fled to the Avars from the Turks)
9. ˀwngr (אוגר) (Ungar; either the Hungarians or the Oghurs/Onogurs)
10. Tolmaṣ (תולמץ) (cf. the Pecheneg tribe Βορο-ταλμάτ < *Boru-Tolmaç mentioned by Byzantine emperor Constantine VII).

An 11th-century Yemenite Jew created for the Josippon an Arabic translation, wherefrom Pritsak (1978) extracts and reconstructs these names:

1. al-Khazar (Khazars)
2. al-Bajanāq (Pechenegs)
3. al-Ās-Alān (Alans)
4. al-Bulġar (Bulgars)
5. [...]
6. [...]
7. [...]
8. Khyabars (Kabars? or Sabirs?)
9. Unjar (Hungarians or Oghurs/Onogurs)
10. Ṭalmīs (cf. the Pecheneg tribe Βορο-ταλμάτ < *Boru-Tolmaç mentioned by Byzantine emperor Constantine VII).

Meanwhile, from that same Arabic translation, Kánnai (2004) extracts and reconstructs eleven names:

1. Khazar (Khazars)
2. Badsanag (Pechenegs)
3. Asz-alân (Alans)
4. Bulghar (Bulgars)
5. Zabub (the Northwest Caucasian Zygii? or a Zabender people who fled to the Avars from the Turks)
6. Fitrakh (or Kotrakh?) (Kutrigurs? or a Kotzager people who fled to the Avars from the Turks)
7. Nabir (possibly a scribal error for Sabir, meaning the Sabirs)
8. Andsar (or Ajhar?) (Hungarians or Oghurs/Onogurs)
9. Talmisz (cf. the Pecheneg tribe Βορο-ταλμάτ < *Boru-Tolmaç mentioned by Byzantine emperor Constantine VII))
10. Adzîgher (Utigurs? or Adyghe?)
11. Anszuh

In the Chronicles of Jerahmeel, the three "children" are listed as:

1. Abihud
2. Shāfaṭ
3. Yaftir

And the ten "families" are listed as:

1. Cuzar (the Khazars)
2. Pasinaq (the Pechenegs)
3. Alan (the Alans)
4. Bulgar (the Bulgars)
5. Kanbinah (or a scribal error for Kotzager a people who fled to the Avars from the Turks, or Kutrigurs; cf. Kánnai's uncertain reconstruction Kotrakh)
6. Turq (possibly the Göktürks)
7. Buz (possibly scribal error for **Kwz, meaning Oghuz Turks)
8. Zakhukh (scribal error for **Zykws, meaning Zygii?) (or a Zabender people who fled to the Avars from the Turks)
9. Ugar (either the Hungarians or the Oghurs/Onogurs)
10. Tulmes (cf. the Pecheneg tribe Βορο-ταλμάτ < *Boru-Tolmaç mentioned by Byzantine emperor Constantine VII)

Another medieval rabbinic work, the Book of Jasher, give the names:

1. Buzar (possibly scribal error for Kuzar, meaning Khazars)
2. Parzunac (the Pechenegs)
3. Elicanum (the Alans?)
4. Balgar (the Bulgars)
5. Ragbib (or a scribal error for Kotzager a people who fled to the Avars from the Turks, or Kutrigurs; cf. Kánnai's uncertain reconstruction Kotrakh)
6. Tarki (possibly the Göktürks)
7. Bid (possibly scribal error for **Kuz, meaning Oghuz Turks)
8. Zebuc (scribal error for Zykws, meaning Zygii?) (or a Zabender people who fled to the Avars from the Turks)
9. Ongal (Hungarians or Oghurs/Onogurs)
10. Tilmaz (cf. the Pecheneg tribe Βορο-ταλμάτ < *Boru-Tolmaç mentioned by Byzantine emperor Constantine VII)).

In the 18th century, the French Benedictine monk and scholar Calmet (1672–1757) placed Togarmah in Scythia and Turcomania (in the Eurasian Steppes and Central Asia).

== See also ==
Japheth
