= Lekos (Dagestan) =

Lekos (Lek, Lekas) is the legendary ancestor-eponym of "Legae" tribe of the Caucasus. In Georgian sources, the fifth son (or offspring) of Togarmah.

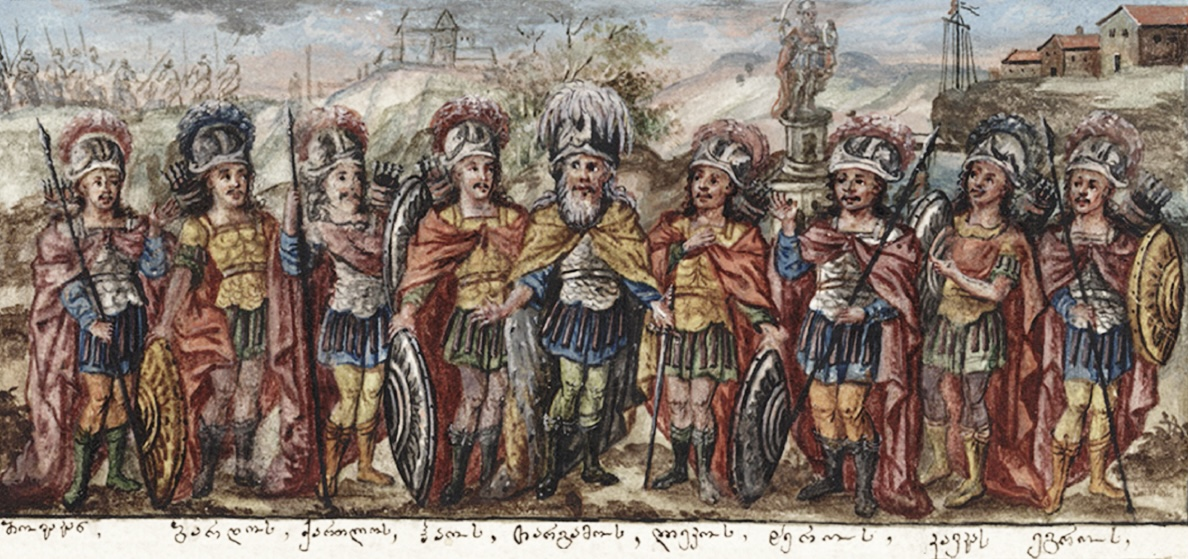
Thargamos and his sons. The order of the figures from left to right is: Movakan, Bardos, Kartlos, Hayk, Thargamos, Lekos, Heros, Caucas, Egros. An opening folio of the Georgian Chronicles (Vakhtangiseuli redaction), 1700s.

== Ancient history ==
According to Leonti Mroveli, Togarmah "gave to Lekos territories from the Sea of Daruband to the river Lomek, to the north up to the great river of Khazareti".

== Historical background ==
In Georgian sources, ethnonym "Leki" (Legae) is usually used to refer to all the peoples of Dagestan. In Georgian history, during the 18th century, "Leki-anoba" was the name given to sporadic forays by Northeast Caucasian people into Georgia. But historically the Leki are one of the tribes of Caucasian Albania. Leki were located in the territories of the current residence of the Lezgins, according to one of the leading experts on the history of Caucasian Albania, Kamilla Trever, the legae mentioned next to the gelae apparently lived in the mountainous regions of the Samur River basin.

== Etymology ==
Georgian "Leki" is naturally associated with the Lezgins. The self-name of the Lezgin people is "leq'er". Louis Vivien, a French geographer of the 19th century, writes that “The Lekzi, also called Lakzi by other Arab authors, are the Legae of the ancient Greeks, the Leki of the Georgians, the Legki of the Armenians, the Lezgi of our travelers; they have not changed either their place of residence or their name”.

== See also ==
- Legae
- Lezgins
- Lezgistan
- Caucasian Albania
- Dagestan
- Northeastern Caucasian languages
