= Elishah =

Figure in the Book of Genesis

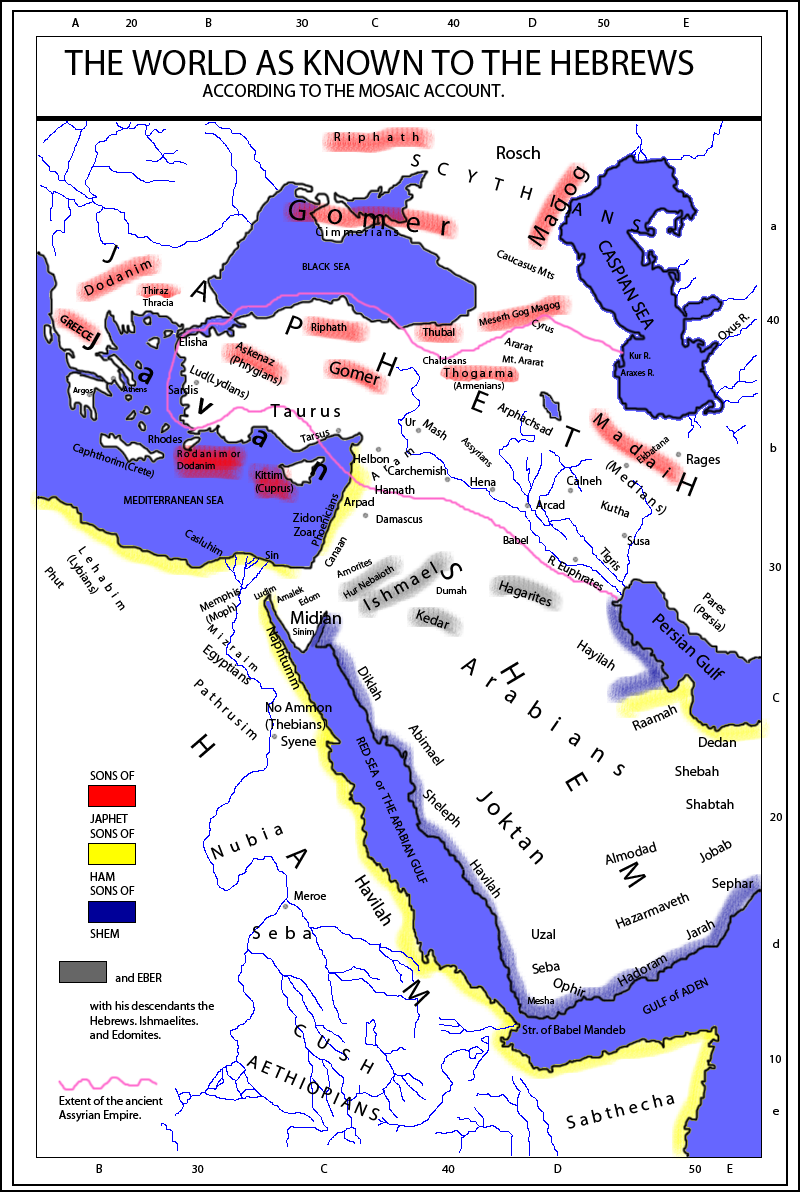
The Table of Nations according to the Bible

Elishah (אֱלִישָׁה ’Ĕlîšāh) was the son of Javan according to the Book of Genesis (10:4) in the Masoretic Text. The Greek Septuagint of Genesis 10 lists Elisa as the son of Javan and a grandson of Japheth. In Hebrew, his name is differentiated from that of the prophet Elisha by its ending in a hei (ה) rather than an ayin (ע).

Elishah has traditionally been associated with Cypriots, as the island of Cyprus is a possible location of the Bronze Age kingdom of Alashiya. According to the Jewish Encyclopedia, Elishah is to be identified with Magna Graecia and Sicels.Flavius Josephus related the descendants of Elishah to the Aeolians, one of the ancestral branches of the Greeks. Other traditions identify Elishah with Hellas and Carthage ("Elissa").

Elishah is also mentioned in the mediaeval rabbinic Book of Jasher (Hebrew transliteration: Sefer haYashar); he is said in Jasher to have been the ancestor of the "Almanim", possibly a reference to Germanic tribes (Alemanni). An older and more common tradition refers to him as a settler of Greece, particularly Elis in the Peloponnese.

== Portuguese traditions ==
Elishah features heavily in the folk traditions and national mythography of Portugal. According to tradition, Elishah (called Lysias or Lísias) is an ancestor of Lusus, son of Bacchus. Elisha is older than Lusus, reaching the Iberian Peninsula with his uncle, the Biblical character Tubal, and founding the city of Portalegre. He is traditionally considered the first "cultivator" of Lusitania. Tradition places Lusus' reign in the 16th - 15th centuries BC, as in the Livro Primeiro da Monarchia Lusitana of Bernardo de Brito.

The Portuguese orator and mythographer Father António Vieira (1608-1697) refers to Elishah as founder and eponym of both Lisbon and Lusitania, as well as Elysium of Greek mythology. Vieira also identified Elisha's Biblical brother Tarshish as the founder of Tartessos in Andalucia. Elishah in this portrayal is identified with Bacchus' captain Lysias/Lísias as well as with Lusus and Phoroneus,. He is said to have founded Portalegre, and was buried at the Ermida de São Cristovão (Chapel of Saint Christopher).

== See also ==
- Dodanim
- Javan
- Kittim
- Tarshish
- Sons of Noah
