= Kittim =

Biblical term

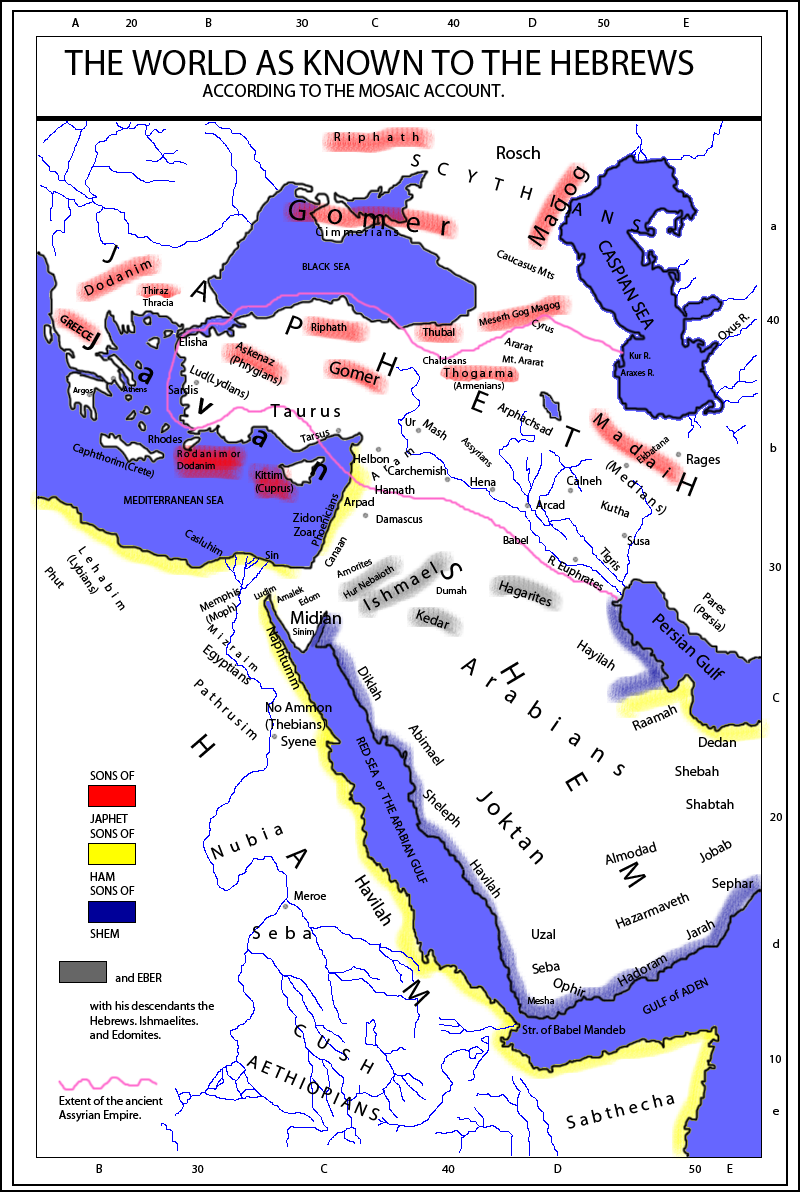
The world as known to the Hebrews (1854 construction)

Kittim was a settlement in present-day Larnaca on the east coast of Cyprus, known in ancient times as Kition. On this basis, the whole island became known as "Kittim" in Hebrew, including the Hebrew Bible. However the name seems to have been employed with some flexibility in Hebrew literature. It was often applied to the Aegean Islands and even to "the W[est] in general, but esp[ecially] the seafaring W[est]". Flavius Josephus (c. 100 AD) records in his Antiquities of the Jews that

Cethimus [son of Javan] possessed the island Cethima: it is now called Cyprus; and from that it is that all islands, and the greatest part of the sea-coasts, are named Cethim by the Hebrews: and one city there is in Cyprus that has been able to preserve its denomination; it has been called Citius [or Citium/Κίτιον] by those who use the language of the Greeks, and has not, by the use of that dialect, escaped the name of Cethim.

The expression "isles of Kittim", found in the Book of Jeremiah 2:10 and Ezekiel 27:6, indicates that, some centuries prior to Josephus, this designation had already become a general descriptor for the Mediterranean islands. Sometimes this designation was further extended to apply to Romans, Macedonians or Seleucid Greeks. The Septuagint translates the occurrence of "Kittim" in the Book of Daniel 11:30 as Ῥωμαῖοι ("Romans"). 1 Maccabees 1:1 states that "Alexander the Great the Macedonian" had come from the "land of Kittim". In the War of the Sons of Light Against the Sons of Darkness from the Dead Sea Scrolls, the Kittim are referred to as being "of Asshur". Eleazar Sukenik argued that this reference to Asshur should be understood to refer to the Seleucid Empire which controlled the territory of the former Assyrian Empire at that time, but his son Yigael Yadin interpreted this phrase as a veiled reference to the Romans. Kittim is also referenced in Numbers 24:24 in the Old Testament of the Bible.

== Etymology ==
Some authors have speculated that it comes from an Akkadian word meaning "invaders". Others (following Max Müller) have identified Kittim with the land of Hatti (Khatti), as the Hittite Empire was known.

=== Hebrew Bible ===
Kittim (Hebrew: כִּתִּים, alternately transliterated as Chittim or Cethim) in the genealogy of Genesis 10 in the Hebrew Bible, is the son of Javan, Genesis 10:4, the grandson of Japheth, and Noah's great-grandson.

== Account in Yosippon ==
The mediaeval rabbinic compilation Yosippon contains a detailed account of the Kittim. As the peoples spread out, it says, the Kittim camped in Campania and built a city called "Posomanga", while descendants of Tubal camped in neighboring Tuscany and built "Sabino", with the Tiber river as their frontier. However, they soon went to war following the rape of the Sabines by the Kittim, who are correlated to the Romans. This war was ended when the Kittim showed the descendants of Tubal their mutual progeny. They then built cities called Porto, Albano, and Aresah. Later, their territory is occupied by Agnias, King of Carthage, but the Kittim end up appointing Zepho, son of Eliphaz and grandson of Esau, as their king, with the title Janus Saturnus. The first king of Rome, Romulus, is made in this account to be a distant successor of this line. A shorter, more garbled version of this story is also found in the later Sefer haYashar.

== See also ==
- Alashiya
- Generations of Noah
- Javan
  - Dodanim
  - Elishah
  - Tarshish
- Larnaca
