= Dodanim =

Biblical character

Dodanim (דֹּדָנִים Dōḏānīm) or Rodanim, (רֹדָנִים Rōḏānīm, Greek: Ρόδιοι, Ródioi) was, in the Book of Genesis, a son of Javan (thus, a great-grandson of Noah). Dodanim's brothers, according to Genesis 10:4, were Elishah, Tarshish and Chittim. He is usually associated with the people of the island of Rhodes as their progenitor. "-im" is a plural suffix in Hebrew, and the name may refer to the inhabitants of Rhodes. Traditional Hebrew manuscripts are split between the spellings Dodanim and Rodanim — one of which is probably a copyist's error, as the Hebrew letters for R and D (ר and ד respectively) are quite similar graphically. The Samaritan Pentateuch, as well as 1 Chronicles 1:7, have Rodanim, while the Septuagint has Rodioi.

The Targum Pseudo-Jonathan calls his country Dordania, while the Targum Neofiti names it Dodonia.

Connections have been suggested with Dodona in Epirus and Dardania in Illyria (as in Genesis Rabbah), as well as with the island of Rhodes. Samuel Bochart associated the form Rodanim with the river Rhone's Latin name, Rhodanus. Franz Delitzsch identified the figure of Dodanim with the Dardanus of Greek mythology, while Joseph Mede equated him with the Jupiter Dodonaeus who had an oracle at Dodona.

Kenneth Kitchen discusses two additional possible etymologies. One possibility he suggests is that "both Dodanim and Rodanim have been reduced from Dordanim -- by loss of medial r in Gen. 10:4 (Dordanim > Dodanim) and of an initial d in 1 Chron. 1:7 (<Do>rdanim > Rodanim). The Dardanayu occur in an Egyptian list of Aegean names under Amenophis III ... and among the Hittite allies against Ramesses II at the Battle of Qadesh in 1275; some would link these with the classical Dardanoi." He also suggests that the name Dodanim may be an altered form of Danunim, an ancient Near Eastern people mentioned in the Amarna letters whose origin and identity is still surrounded by "considerable doubt".

In Pseudo-Philo (c. 70), Dodanim's sons are Itheb, Beath, and Phenech; the last of these is made prince of the Japhethites at the time of the Tower of Babel.
