= Javan =

Son of Japheth and father of the Greeks according to the Bible

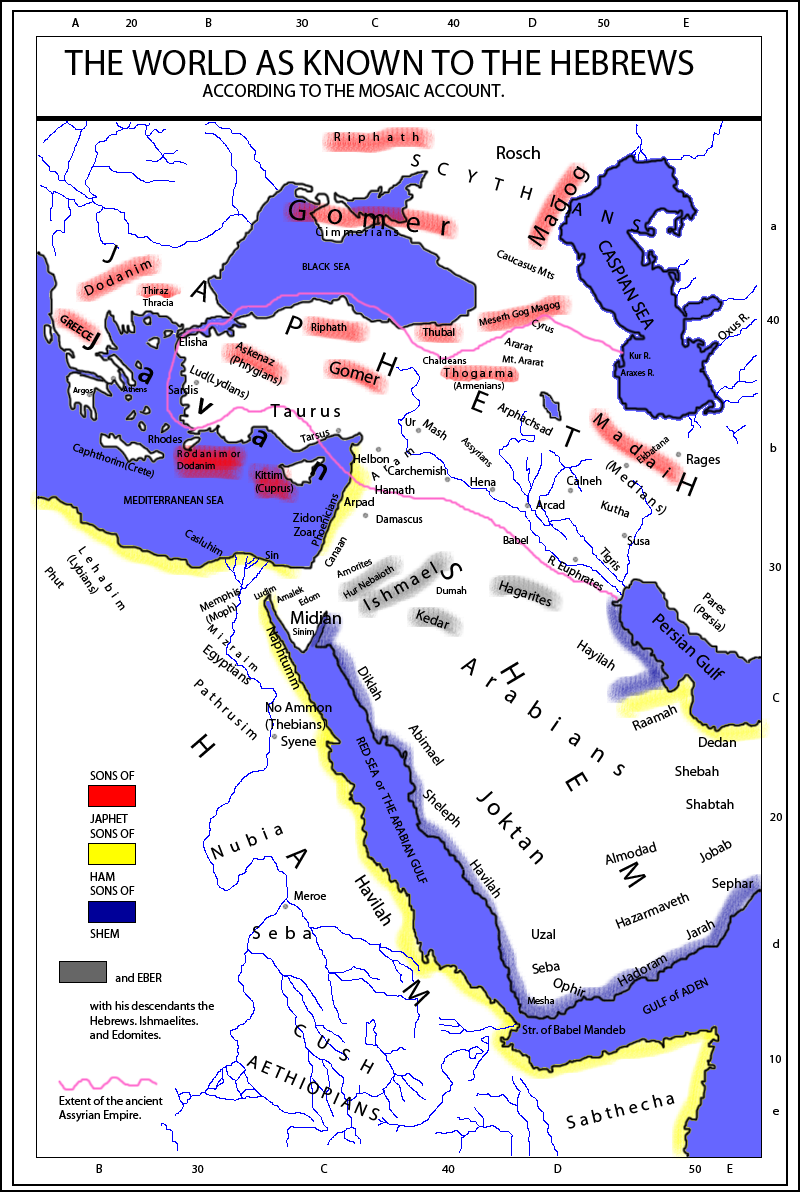
The world as known to the Hebrews

Javan (Hebrew: יָוָן, romanized: Yāwān) was the fourth son of Noah's son Japheth according to the "Generations of Noah" (Book of Genesis, chapter 10) in the Hebrew Bible. Josephus states the traditional belief that this individual was the ancestor of the Greeks.

Also serving as the Hebrew name for Greece or Greeks in general, יָוָן Yavan or Yāwān has long been considered cognate with the name of the eastern Greeks, the Ionians (Greek Ἴωνες Iōnes, Homeric Greek Ἰάονες Iáones; Mycenaean Greek *Ιαϝονες Iawones). Given that all Torah scrolls are strictly unpunctuated, the name יון could also be pronounced Yon, since the letter Waw functions as either consonant (read "w") or vowel (read "o" or "ʊ"). Cognate names were applied to the ancient Greeks throughout the Eastern Mediterranean, Near East and beyond such as the Sanskrit Yavana and Prakrit Yona.

In Greek mythology, the eponymous forefather of the Ionians is similarly called Ion, a son of Apollo. The opinion that Javan is synonymous with Greek Ion and thus fathered the Ionians is common to numerous writers of the early modern period, including Sir Walter Raleigh, Samuel Bochart, John Mill and Jonathan Edwards, and is still frequently encountered today.

Javan is also found in apocalyptic literature in the Book of Daniel, 8:21-22 and 11:2, about the King of Yawan—most commonly interpreted as a reference to Alexander the Great.

Javan is generally associated with the ancient Greeks and Greece (cf. Gen. 10:2, Dan. 8:21, Zech. 9:13, etc.); his sons (as listed in Genesis 10) have usually been associated with locations in the Northeastern Mediterranean Sea and Anatolia: Elishah (Cyprus), Tarshish (Tarsus in Cilicia, but after 1646 often identified with Tartessus in Spain), Kittim (also Cyprus), and Dodanim (alt. 1 Chron. 1:7 'Rodanim,' the island of Rhodes, west of modern Turkey between Cyprus and the mainland of Greece).
