= Gomer =

Biblical figure

Gomer (Hebrew: גֹּמֶר Gōmer; Greek: Γαμὲρ, romanized: Gamér) was the eldest son of Japheth (and of the Japhetic line), and father of Ashkenaz, Riphath, and Togarmah, according to the "Table of Nations" in the Hebrew Bible (Genesis 10).

The eponymous Gomer, "standing for the whole family," as the compilers of The Jewish Encyclopedia expressed it, is also mentioned in Book of Ezekiel 38:6 as the ally of Gog, the chief of the land of Magog.

The Hebrew name Gomer refers to the Cimmerians, who dwelt in Pontic–Caspian steppe, "beyond the Caucasus", and attacked Assyria in the late 7th century BC. The Assyrians called them Gimmerai; the Cimmerian king Teushpa was defeated by Assarhadon of Assyria sometime between 681 and 668 BC.

== Traditional identifications ==
Josephus placed Gomer and the "Gomerites" in Anatolian Galatia: "For Gomer founded those whom the Greeks now call Galatians, but were then called Gomerites." Galatia in fact takes its name from the ancient Gauls (Celts) who settled there. However, the later Christian writer Hippolytus of Rome in c. 234 assigned Gomer as the ancestor of the Cappadocians, neighbours of the Galatians. Jerome (c. 390) and Isidore of Seville (c. 600) followed Josephus' identification of Gomer with the Galatians, Gauls and Celts.

According to tractate Yoma, in the Talmud, Gomer is identified as "Germamya".

The Muslim historian Muhammad ibn Jarir al-Tabari (c. 915) recounts a Persian tradition that Gomer lived to the age of 1000, noting that this record equalled that of Nimrod, but was unsurpassed by anyone else mentioned in the Torah.

The Cimbri were a tribe settled on Jutland peninsula in Germania (now Denmark) c. 200 BC, who were variously identified in ancient times as Cimmerian, Germanic or Celtic. In later times, some scholars connected them with the Welsh people, and descendants of Gomer. Among the first authors to identify Gomer, the Cimmerians, and Cimbri, with the Welsh name for themselves, Cymri, was the English antiquarian William Camden in his Britannia (first published in 1586). In his 1716 book Drych y Prif Oesoedd, Welsh historian Theophilus Evans also posited that the Welsh were descended from the Cimmerians and from Gomer; this was followed by a number of later writers of the 18th and 19th centuries.

This etymology is considered false by modern Celtic linguists, who follow the etymology proposed by Johann Kaspar Zeuss in 1853, which derives Cymry from the Brythonic word *Combrogos ("fellow countryman"). The name Gomer (as in the pen-name of 19th century editor and author Joseph Harris, for instance) and its (modern) Welsh derivatives, such as Gomeraeg (as an alternative name for the Welsh language) became fashionable for a time in Wales, but the Gomerian theory itself has long since been discredited as an antiquarian hypothesis with no historical or linguistic validity.

In 1498 Annio da Viterbo published fragments known as Pseudo-Berossus, now considered a forgery, claiming that Babylonian records had shown that Comerus Gallus, i.e. Gomer son of Japheth, had first settled in Comera (now Italy) in the 10th year of Nimrod following the dispersion of peoples. In addition, Tuiscon, whom Pseudo-Berossus calls the fourth son of Noah, and says ruled first in Germany/Scythia, was identified by later historians (e.g. Johannes Aventinus) as none other than Ashkenaz, Gomer's son.

== Gomer's descendants ==
Three sons of Gomer are mentioned in Genesis 10, namely:

- Ashkenaz
- Riphath (spelled Diphath in I Chronicles)
- Togarmah

Children of Ashkenaz were originally identified with the Scythians (Assyrian Ishkuza), then after the 11th century, with Germany.

Ancient Armenian and Georgian chronicles lists Togarmah as the ancestor of both people who originally inhabited the land between two Black and Caspian Seas and between two inaccessible mountains, Mount Elbrus and Mount Ararat respectively.

According to Khazar records, Togarmah is regarded as the ancestor of the Turkic-speaking peoples.

== General and cited references ==
- Lloyd, John Edward (1912). A History of Wales from the Earliest Times to the Edwardian Conquest.
- Piggot, Stuart (1968). The Druids. Thames and Hudson: London.
- University of Wales Dictionary, Vol. II.
