= Tarshish =

Biblical term, generally a place-name

Suggested locations of Tarshish

Tarshish (Phoenician: 𐤕𐤓𐤔𐤔, romanized: tršš; Hebrew: תַּרְשִׁישׁ, romanized: Taršiš; Koine Greek: Θαρσεῖς, romanized: Tharseis) occurs in the Hebrew Bible with several uncertain meanings, most frequently as a place (probably a large city or region) far across the sea from Phoenicia and the Land of Israel. Tarshish was said to have exported vast quantities of important metals to Phoenicia and Israel. The same place name occurs in the Akkadian inscriptions of the Neo-Assyrian emperor Esarhaddon (died 669 BC) and also on the Phoenician inscription of the Nora Stone (around 800 BC) in Sardinia; its precise location was never commonly known, and was eventually lost in antiquity. Legends grew up around it over time, so its identity has been the subject of scholarly research and commentary for more than two thousand years.

Its importance stems in part from the fact that Hebrew biblical passages tend to understand Tarshish as a source of King Solomon's tremendous wealth in metals – especially silver, but also gold, tin, and iron according to Ezekiel 27. The metals were reportedly obtained in partnership with the Phoenician king Hiram I of Tyre and fleets of ships from Tarshish, according to Isaiah 23.

Tarshish is also the name of a modern village in the Mount Lebanon Governorate, Lebanon, and Tharsis, Huelva is a village in Andalusia, Spain.

According to the Jewish Encyclopedia Da'at, the biblical phrase "ships of Tarshish" refers not to ships from a particular location, but to a class of ships: large vessels for long-distance trade.

== Hebrew Bible ==
Tarshish occurs 25 times in the Masoretic Text of the Hebrew Bible. Although, as stated in the previous section, the phrase "ships of Tarshish" may refer only to huge ships fit for ocean journeys and not to a location or nation, possible references to Tarshish as a location or nation include:

- In Genesis 10:4 Tarshish appears among the Sons of Noah: "And the sons of Javan [were:] Elishah, Tarshish, Kittim, and Dodanim." This is closely restated in 1 Chronicles 1:7.
- 1 Kings 10:22 notes that King Solomon had "a fleet of ships of Tarshish" at sea with the fleet of his ally King Hiram of Tyre: "Once every three years the fleet of ships of Tarshish used to come bringing gold, silver, ivory, apes, and peacocks." This is echoed (with some notable changes) in 2 Chronicles 9:21.
- 1 Kings 22:48 states that "Jehoshaphat made ships of Tarshish to go to Ophir for gold, but they did not go, for the ships were wrecked at Ezion-geber." This is repeated in 2 Chronicles 20:37, preceded by the information that the ships were built at Ezion-Geber, and emphasizing the prophecy of Eliezer son of Dodavahu of Mareshah against Jehoshaphat: "Because you have joined with Ahaziah, the Lord will destroy what you have made." And the ships were wrecked and were not able to go to Tarshish. This may be referenced in Psalms 48:7: "By the east wind you shattered the ships of Tarshish." From these verses, commentators conclude that "ships of Tarshish" was used to denote any large trading ships intended for long voyages, whatever their destination, and some Bible translations, including the NIV, go as far as to translate the phrase ship(s) of Tarshish as "trading ship(s)".
- Psalms 72:10, often interpreted as Messianic in Jewish and Christian tradition, has "May the kings of Tarshish and of the coastlands render him tribute; may the kings of Sheba and Seba bring gifts!" This verse is the source text of the liturgical antiphon Reges Tharsis in Christian Cathedral music. In this Psalm, the 'chain of scaled correlates' consisting of 'mountains and hills', 'rain and showers', 'seas and river' leads up to the phrase 'Tarshish and islands', indicating that Tarshish was a large island.
- Isaiah contains three prophecies mentioning Tarshish. First, at 2:16 "against all the ships of Tarshish, and against all the beautiful craft", then Tarshish is mentioned at length in Chapter 23 against Tyre: "Wail, O ships of Tarshish, for Tyre is laid waste, without house or harbor!" (23:1 and 23:14) and "Cross over to Tarshish; wail, O inhabitants of the coast!" (23:6). In 23:10, Tyre is identified as a "daughter of Tarshish". These prophecies are reversed in Isaiah 60:9: "For the coastlands shall hope for me, the ships of Tarshish first, to bring your children from afar"; and 66:19: "and I will set a sign among them. And from them I will send survivors to the nations, to Tarshish, Pul, and Lud, who draw the bow, to Tubal and Javan, to the coastlands far away, that have not heard my fame or seen my glory. And they shall declare my glory among the nations."
- Jeremiah only mentions Tarshish in passing as a source of silver: "Beaten silver is brought from Tarshish, and gold from Uphaz" (10:9).
- Ezekiel describes Tyre's trading relations with Tarshish: "Tarshish did business with you because of your great wealth of every kind; silver, iron, tin, and lead they exchanged for your wares" (27:12) and "The ships of Tarshish traveled for you with your merchandise. So you were filled and heavily laden in the heart of the seas" (27:25). The metals from Tarshish were stored in Tyre and resold, probably to Mesopotamia. In the prophecy against Gog, Ezekiel predicts: "Sheba and Dedan and the merchants of Tarshish and all its leaders will say to you, 'Have you come to seize spoil? Have you assembled your hosts to carry off plunder, to carry away silver and gold, to take away livestock and goods, to seize great spoil?'" (38:13)
- Jonah 1:3 and 4:2 mention Tarshish as a distant place: "But Jonah rose to flee to Tarshish from the presence of the Lord. He went down to Jaffa and found a ship going to Tarshish." Jonah's fleeing to Tarshish may need to be taken as "a place very far away" rather than a precise geographical term.

== Other ancient and classical-era sources ==
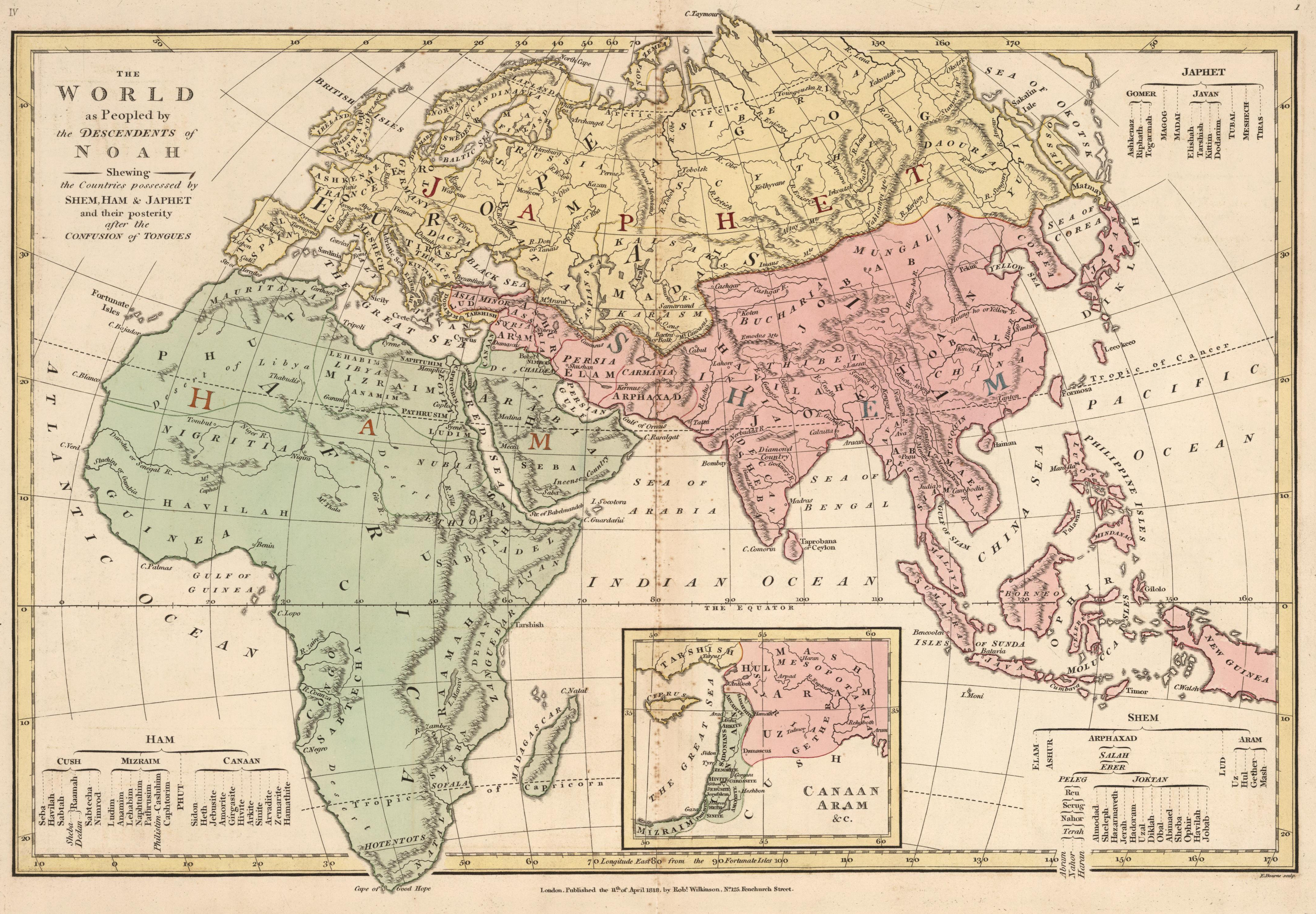
The 19th-century "World as Peopled by the Descendants of Noah", showing "Tarshish" as the countryside around Tarsus in southeastern Anatolia

- Esarhaddon, Aššur Babylon E (AsBbE) preserves "All the kings from the lands surrounded by sea – from the country Iadanana (Cyprus) and Iaman, as far as Tarsisi (Tarshish) – bowed to my feet." Here, Tarshish is certainly a large island, and cannot be confused with Tarsus (Thompson and Skaggs 2013).
- Flavius Josephus (1st century) reads "Tarshush", identifying it as the city of Tarsus in southern Asia Minor, which some have later equated with the Tarsisi mentioned in Assyrian records from the reign of Esarhaddon. Phoenician inscriptions were found at Karatepe in Cilicia. Bunsen and Sayce have seemed to agree with Josephus, but the Phoenicians were active in many regions where metals were available, and classical authors, some biblical authors, and the Nora Stone inscription mentioning Tarshish generally place Phoenician expansion aimed at metals-acquisition in the western Mediterranean.
- The Septuagint and the Vulgate in several passages translate it with Carthage, apparently following a Jewish tradition found in the Targum of Jonathan ("Afriki", i.e., Carthage).

== Identifications and interpretations ==
Tarshish is placed on the shores of the Mediterranean Sea by several biblical passages, and more precisely: west of Israel. It is described as a source of various metals: "beaten silver is brought from Tarshish" (Jeremiah 10:9), and the Phoenicians of Tyre brought from there silver, iron, tin and lead (Ezekiel 27:12).

The context in Isaiah 23:6 and 66:19 seems to indicate that it is an island, and from Israel it could be reached by ship, as attempted by Jonah (Jonah 1:3) and performed by Solomon's fleet (2 Chronicles 9:21). Some modern scholars identify Tarshish with Tartessos, a port in southern Spain, described by classical authors as a source of metals for the Phoenicians, while Josephus' identification of Tarshish with the city of Tarsus in Cilicia (south-central Turkey) is even more widely accepted. However, a clear identification is not possible, since a whole array of Mediterranean sites with similar names are connected to the mining of various metals.

=== Mediterranean Sea ===
According to Rashi, a medieval rabbi and commentator of the Bible, quoting Tractate Hullin 9lb, 'tarshish' means the Mediterranean Sea.

=== Carthage ===
The Targum of Jonathan along with several passages of the Septuagint and the Vulgate render Tarshish as Carthage. The Jewish-Portuguese scholar, politician, statesman and financier Isaac Abarbanel (1437–1508 AD) described Tarshish as "the city known in earlier times as Carthage and today called Tunis."

=== Sardinia ===
Thompson and Skaggs argue that the Akkadian inscriptions of Esarhaddon (AsBbE) indicate that Tarshish was an island (not a coastland) far to the west of the Levant. American scholars William F. Albright (1891–1971) and Frank Moore Cross (1921–2012) suggested Tarshish was Sardinia, because of the discovery of the Nora Stone, whose Phoenician inscription mentions Tarshish. Cross read the inscription to understand that it was referring to Tarshish as Sardinia.

In 2003, Christine Marie Thompson identified the Cisjordan Corpus, a concentration of hacksilver hoards in Israel and Palestine (Cisjordan). This Corpus dates between 1200 and 586 BC, and the hoards in it are all silver-dominant. The largest hoard was found at Eshtemo'a, present-day as-Samu, and contained 26 kg of silver. Within it, and specifically in the geographical region that was part of Phoenicia, is a concentration of hoards dated between 1200 and 800 BC. There is no other known such concentration of silver hoards in the contemporary Mediterranean, and its date-range overlaps with the reigns of King Solomon (970–931 BC) and Hiram of Tyre (980–947 BC).

Hacksilver objects in these Phoenician hoards have lead isotope ratios that match ores in the silver-producing regions of Sardinia and Spain, only one of which is a large island rich in silver. Contrary to translations that have been rendering Assyrian tar-si-si as 'Tarsus' up to the present time, Thompson argues that the Assyrian tablets inscribed in Akkadian indicate tar-si-si (Tarshish) was a large island in the western Mediterranean, and that the poetic construction of Psalm 72:10 also shows that it was a large island to the very distant west of Phoenicia. The island of Sardinia was always known as a hub of the metals trade in antiquity, and was also called by the ancient Greeks as Argyróphleps nésos "island of the silver veins".

The same evidence from hacksilver is said to fit with what the ancient Greek and Roman authors recorded about the Phoenicians exploiting many sources of silver in the western Mediterranean to feed developing economies back in Israel and Phoenicia soon after the fall of Troy and other palace centers in the eastern Mediterranean around 1200 BC. Classical sources starting with Homer (8th century BC), and the Greek historians Herodotus (484–425 BC) and Diodorus Siculus (d. 30 BC) said the Phoenicians were exploiting the metals of the west for these purposes before they set up the permanent colonies in the metal-rich regions of the Mediterranean and Atlantic.

=== Either Sardinia or Spain ===
The editors of the New Oxford Annotated Bible, first published in 1962, suggest that Tarshish is either Sardinia or Tartessos.

=== Spain ===
Rufus Festus Avienus the Latin writer of the 4th century AD, identified Tarshish as Cádiz. This is the theory espoused by Father Mapple in Chapter 9 of Moby Dick.

Some biblical commentators as early as 1646 (Samuel Bochart) read it as Tartessos in ancient Hispania (the Iberian Peninsula), near Huelva and Sevilla today. Bochart, the 17th century French Protestant pastor, suggested in his Phaleg (1646) that Tarshish was the city of Tartessos in southern Spain. He was followed by others, including Hertz (1936).

=== Phoenician coast ===
Sir Peter le Page Renouf (1822–1897) thought that "Tarshish" meant a coast, and, as the word occurs frequently in connection with Tyre, the Phoenician coast is to be understood.

=== Tyrsenians or Etruscans ===
T. K. Cheyne (1841–1915) thought that "Tarshish" of Genesis 10:4 and "Tiras" of Genesis 10:2 are really two names of one nation derived from two different sources, and might indicate the Tyrsenians or Etruscans.

=== Britain ===
Some 19th-century commentators believed that Tarshish was Britain, including Alfred John Dunkin who said "Tarshish demonstrated to be Britain" (1844), George Smith (1850), James Wallis and David King's The British Millennial Harbinger (1861), John Algernon Clarke (1862), and Jonathan Perkins Weethee of Ohio (1887). This idea stems from the fact that Tarshish is recorded to have been a trader in tin, silver, gold, and lead, all of which were mined in Cornwall. This is still reputed to be the "Merchants of Tarshish" today by some Christian sects.

=== Southeast Africa ===
Augustus Henry Keane (1833–1912) believed that Tarshish was Sofala, and that the biblical land of Havilah was centered on the nearby Great Zimbabwe.

=== Southern India and Sri Lanka ===
Bochart, apart from Spain (see there), also suggested eastern localities for the ports of Ophir and Tarshish during King Solomon's reign, specifically the Tamilakkam continent (present day South India and Northern Ceylon) where the Dravidians were well known for their gold, pearls, ivory and peacock trade. He fixed on "Tarshish" being the site of Kudiramalai, a possible corruption of Thiruketheeswaram.

=== Cilicia ===
Tarshish may refer to Tarsus in Cilicia, where Saul, later Paul, hailed from (Acts 9:11, 21:39, 22:3).

=== Tarxien ===
There are several indications that Tarshish could have been located at Malta, where still today a local council is called Tarxien. The pronunciation in the Semitic language of the Maltese people is rather similar to the Hebrew pronunciation of Tarshish (namely [tɐrˈʃɪːn]). All megalithic temples from the Neolithic epoch of Malta are assigned to the Tarxien phase of the island. The inhabitants claim that Tarxien was founded by the Carthaginians.

== Controversy ==
The existence of Tarshish in the western Mediterranean, along with any Phoenician presence in the western Mediterranean before c. 800 BC, has been questioned by some scholars in modern times, because there is no direct evidence. Instead, the lack of evidence for wealth in Israel and Phoenicia during the reigns of Solomon and Hiram, respectively, prompted a few scholars to opine that the archaeological period in Mediterranean prehistory between 1200 and 800 BC was a 'Dark Age'.

== Other usage ==
- The Hebrew term has a homonym, tarshish, occurring seven times and translated beryl in older English versions. According to Exodus 28:20, it is one of the precious stones set into the priestly breastplate ("the fourth row [shall be] a beryl [tarshish], and ..."). It is associated with the Tribe of Asher, and has been identified by the Septuagint and Josephus as the "gold stone" χρυσόλιθος (whose identification remains in dispute, possibly topaz, probably not modern chrysolite), and later as aquamarine.
- 1 Chronicles 7:10, part of a genealogy, mentions in passing a Jewish man named Tarshish, son of Bilhan.
- Esther 1:14 mentions in passing a Persian prince named Tarshish among the seven princes of Persia.
- Tarshish is the name of a village in Lebanon, about 50 km (31 mi) from Beirut. It is located in the Baabda Kadaa at 1,400 m (4,600 ft) elevation.
- Tarshish is a family name found among Jews of Ashkenazic descent. A variation on the name, Tarshishi, is found among the Lebanese, and likely indicates a family connection to the Lebanese village Tarshish.
- Tarshish was also the name of a short-lived political party founded by Moshe Dwek, would-be assassin of Israeli Prime Minister David Ben-Gurion.
- The Greek form of the name, Tharsis, was given by Giovanni Schiaparelli to a region on Mars.
- The classic short story "Ship of Tarshish" by John Buchan refers to the Book of Jonah.
- Around 1665, some followers of Sabbatai Zvi in İzmir prophesied that "ships of Tarshish, that is, with Dutch crews", would transport them to the Holy Land.

== See also ==
- Sons of Noah
- Javan
- Elishah
- Kittim
- Dodanim
- Sepharad
- Tarsus, Mersin
