= Riphath =

Biblical figure

Riphath (Hebrew: ריפת) was great-grandson of Noah, grandson of Japheth, son of Gomer (Japheth's eldest), younger brother of Ashkenaz, and older brother of Togarmah according to the Table of Nations in the Hebrew Bible (Genesis 10:3, 1 Chronicles 1:6). The name appears in some copies of 1 Chronicles as "Diphath", due to the similarities of the characters resh and dalet in the Hebrew and Aramaic alphabets.

== Analysis ==
His identity is "completely unknown."

He was supposed by Flavius Josephus to have been the ancestor of the "Riphatheans, now called Paphlagonians". Hippolytus of Rome made him the ancestor of the Sauromatians (as distinct from the "Sarmatians", whom he called descendants of Riphath's elder brother, Ashkenaz).

Riphath has often been connected with the Riphean Mountains of classical Greek geography, in whose foothills the Arimaspi (also called Arimphaei or Riphaeans) were said to live. These generally regarded as the western branch of the Ural Mountains.

August Wilhelm Knobel proposed that Riphath begat the Celtic peoples, who according to Plutarch had crossed from the Riphaean Mountains while en route to Northern Europe. Smith's Bible Dictionary also forwards Knobel's notion that the Carpathian Mountains "in the northeast of Dacia" is the site of the Riphath or Riphean Mountains.

Some versions of the Middle Irish work Lebor Gabála Érenn give as an alternate name "Riphath Scot" son of Gomer, in place of Fenius Farsa, as a Scythian ancestor of the Goidels.
