= Magog (Bible) =

Figure in the biblical Book of Genesis

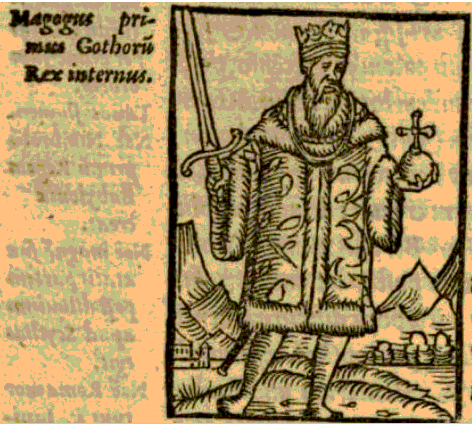
Illustration of Magog as the first king of Sweden, from Johannes Magnus' Historia de omnibus Gothorum Sueonumque regibus, 1554 ed.

Magog (/ˈmeɪɡɒɡ/; Hebrew: מָגוֹג, romanized: Māgōg, Tiberian: [mɔˈɣoɣ]; Ancient Greek: Μαγώγ, romanized: Magṓg) is the second of the seven sons of Japheth mentioned in the Table of Nations in Genesis 10.

== Etymology ==
The origin of the name Magog is not clear; this name indicates either a person, or a tribe, or a geographical reality (country or city). In the book of Ezekiel, the pagan Magog people live "north of the World", and metaphorically represent the forces of Evil, which associates it with Apocalyptic traditions. It has been conjectured to come from the Akkadian mat Gugi, "land of Gog", that is, the land of Gyges: Lydia.

== In the Bible ==
Magog is often associated with apocalyptic traditions, mainly in connection with Ezekiel 38 and 39 which mentions "Gog of the land of Magog, the chief prince of Meshech and Tubal" (Ezek 38:2 NIV); on the basis of this mention, "Gog and Magog" over time became associated with each other as a pair. In the New Testament, this pairing is found in the Book of Revelation 20:8, in which instance they may merely be metaphors for archetypal enemies of God.

== Ancient and medieval views ==
Josephus refers to Magog son of Japheth as progenitor of Scythians, or peoples north of the Black Sea. According to him, the Greeks called Scythia Magogia. An alternative identification, derived from an examination of the order in which tribal names are listed in Ezekiel 38, "would place Magog between Cappadocia and Media." According to Rabbi Shlomo Ganzfried (19th century), Magog refers to the Mongols. He cites an Arab writer who refers to the Great Wall of China with the name 'Magog'.

Jordanes' Getica (551) mentions Magog as ancestor of the Goths, as does the Historia Brittonum, but Isidore of Seville (c. 635) asserts that this identification was popular "because of the similarity of the last syllable" (Etymologiae, IX, 89). Johannes Magnus (1488–1544) stated that Magog migrated to Scandinavia (via Finland) 88 years after the flood, and that his five sons were Suenno (ancestor of the Swedes), Gethar (or Gog, ancestor of the Goths), Ubbo (who later ruled the Swedes and built Old Uppsala), Thor, and German. Magnus's accounts was accepted at the Swedish court for a long time, and even caused the dynastic numerals of the Swedish monarchs to be renumbered accordingly. Queen Christina of Sweden reckoned herself as number 249 in a list of kings going back to Magog. Magnus also influenced several later historians such as Daniel Juslenius (1676–1752), who derived the roots of the Finns from Magog.

According to several medieval Irish chronicles, most notably the Auraicept na n-Éces and Lebor Gabála Érenn, the Irish race are a composite including descendants of Japheth's son Magog from "Scythia". Baath mac Magog (Boath), Jobhath, and Fathochta are the three sons of Magog. Fenius Farsaid, Partholón, Nemed, the Fir Bolg, the Tuatha de Danann, and the Milesians are among Magog's descendants. Magog was also supposed to have had a grandson called Heber, whose offspring spread throughout the Mediterranean.

There is also a medieval Hungarian legend that says the Huns, as well as the Magyars, are descended from twin brothers named Hunor and Magor respectively, who lived by the sea of Azov in the years after the flood, and took wives from the Alans. The version of this legend in the 14th-century Chronicon Pictum identifies this Magor as the descendant of Magog, son of Japheth.

== In Islam ==
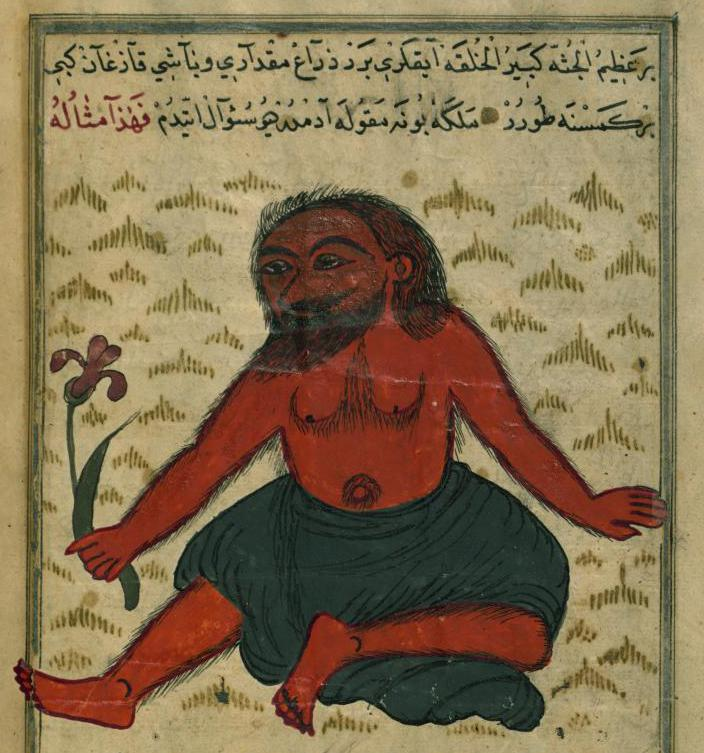
The Monster of Gog and Magog, Muhammad ibn Muhammad Shakir Ruzmah-'i Nathani

Magog's appearance in the Quran and other Islamic sources is chiefly due to his apocalyptic renown as part of the pairing of Gog and Magog (Arabic: Ya'juj wa Ma'juj). In sura Al-Kahf ("The Cave", 18:83–98) of the Quran (early 7th century AD), an individual called Dhul-Qarnayn ("The Two-horned One") journeys to a distant land in a pass between two mountains where he finds people who are suffering from the mischief of Gog and Magog. Dhul-Qarnayn then makes a wall of copper and iron to keep Gog and Magog out, but warns that it will be removed in the Last Age. In sura 21, Al-Anbiyā (The Prophets), the wall is mentioned again: there Allah tells His Prophet (Muhammad) that there is a "prohibition upon [the people of] a city which We have destroyed that they will [ever] return, until [the dam of] Gog and Magog has been opened and thou shall see them, from every higher ground, descending."

== In popular culture ==
- In the season 13 episode "Good Intentions" of the TV series Supernatural, Magog appears as a warrior, alongside another named Gog. They battle protagonists Castiel and Dean Winchester. After Dean kills them, Magog and Gog are revealed to be primitive beasts formed of rock and sand, a type of creature Castiel had believed to have gone extinct during the Great Flood.
- In the 23-minute epic Genesis song "Supper's Ready" from 1972, the "Guards of Magog" are mentioned in the 6th section entitled "Apocalypse in 9/8 (Co-Starring the Delicious Talents of Gabble Ratchet)". During live performances of the song, lead singer Peter Gabriel would wear an outfit to represent Magog.
- In the TV series Andromeda, the Magog are depicted as a hostile race of aliens who attack earth and decimate its population. They are shown to reproduce by laying eggs in human hosts only to devour the host upon birth.
- In the Oddworld video game series, the villainous conglomerate opposing the protagonist in every game is named the Magog Cartel.

== Bibliography ==
- (in French) Jocelyn Rochat, "George W. Bush et le Code Ezéchiel", Allez savoir !, no. 39, September 2007.
