= The Asatir =

Collection of Samaritan Biblical legends

The Asaṭīr (Arabic: الاساطير, al-Asāṭīr), also known as the Samaritan Book of the Secrets of Moses, is a collection of Samaritan Biblical legends, parallel to the midrash, and which draws heavily upon oral traditions known among Jews in the Rabbinic period, written in the 10th or 11th centuries CE.

The book is written in the form of a chronicle, its narrative covering the whole of the Samaritan Torah, starting with Adam, the first man, and concluding with the death of Moses, adding thereto anecdotal material not available in the Hebrew Bible. It primarily deals with the succession of personages from Adam to Moses, spanning approximately 26 generations. The entire book is written around the story of their lives, as passed down through oral traditions. The book ascribes 2800 years from the first man, Adam, to Israel's victory over the Midianites.

The book, preserved by the Samaritans of Nablus, compiled on parchment in late Samaritan Aramaic mixed with an antiquated Arabic vernacular, and divided into twelve chapters, was discovered by Gaster in 1907. Its antiquity is attested to by the fact that it was written when the vestiges of a "peculiar Samaritan Hebrew-Aramaic" were still in practice and Arabic had only begun to supersede it. Since there is no evidence that Moses conveyed the oral traditions contained therein, various Samaritan writers merely refer to its author as "the Master of the Asatir" or the "Author of the Asatir" (Baal Asatir), leaving it undecided whether Moses was the source of these legends. The book is therefore considered pseudepigraphic. The account tells of the Pharaoh in the time of Moses being from the progeny of Japheth, rather than of Ham. Pharaoh in the time of Joseph, the same account says, was from the progeny of Ishmael.

== Name ==
The book's title, "Asatir," was thought by Gaster to mean "secrets," and he renamed it "The Secrets of Moses." Even so, such an interpretation has nothing to do with the contents of the book or its subject. A more precise translation of the Arabic title of the work, al-Asāṭīr, would be "legends" or "tales," as in the Quranic expression asāṭīr al-awwalīn "the legends of the Ancients".

== Date ==
The consensus is that the Asatir was written in the 10th or 11th century.

In the 1920s, Moses Gaster dated the text to the third century BC. However, this theory was discredited by Ze'ev Ben-Hayyim in the 1940s, who produced the last critical edition of the text. Ben-Hayyim showed that the text could not have been written before the 10th century CE. The Aramaic used to write the Asatir was the Aramaic being used from the 10th and 11th centuries, and the Asatir is aware of Islamic developments in history. Some historians have posited that the language of the Asatir is particularly comparable to the literary style of the 11th century Arabic poetry of Abū'l-Ḥasan aṣ-Ṣūrī. (Note: Ab Isda (Ab Ḥisda) of Tyre of the eleventh century, also known by his kunya أبو الحسن (Abu'l Ḥasan), to whom the authorship of the first (original) Samaritan Arabic translation is attributed, is the author of the كتاب الطباخ (Kitāb aṭ-Ṭabbāḫ) [see: JRUL Sam. codex 9A], the famous polemic treatise against Judaism, Christianity, Islam and Karaism. A certain number of prayers in late Aramaic are also ascribed unto him [see: SL 70–72, 79–81, 875–877].)

== Literary style and content ==
The epithet used to describe Nimrod in Genesis 10:8, namely, Gibbor, is rendered by the author of The Asatir as "giant," rather than "mighty one." According to The Asatir, there were several kings, one in succession after the other, one of whose names was Nimrod. Seth is said to have built the city of Antioch, one of the cities inhabited before the Genesis flood narrative. In contrast, Noah, after the Great Deluge, is said to have been buried in the Tomb of the Patriarchs in Hebron, along with Adam, the first man. The alleged grave of Adam aligns with Jewish tradition.

The Asatir describes the descendants of two of the sons of Shem, viz. Lud and Aram, as having settled in a region of Afghanistan formerly known as Khorasan but known in Arabic as the Jazirah "region, island". Elam and Ashur are said to have settled in places north of Ur of the Chaldees.

The first half of the 11th chapter contains a description of the borders of the Land of Israel, in which some of the place names mentioned are no longer identifiable. Some suggest that the author's familiarity with the geography of Syria leads to the conclusion that he may have lived in the Levant, where large Samaritan communities then flourished in Acre, Tyre, and Damascus.

=== Traditions parallel with Jewish tradition ===
While the author of The Asatir and Jewish traditions are in general agreement, there are differences in minor details. For example, according to Seder Olam Rabba, there were 340 years from the Great Deluge in the time of Noah (dated at 1656 anno mundi) to the Division of the earth (dated at 1996 anno mundi) when his sons were sent into their respective countries at the confounding of the languages, only ten years before the death of Noah, when he was aged 940. The Samaritan tradition, as conveyed by The Asatir, avers differently, that Noah divided the earth among his three sons and their descendants some twenty years before his death, when he was aged 930.

== Translations of work ==
Today, there exists an English translation of the work, made by Moses Gaster. A partial Hebrew translation was later published by Zeev Ben-Ḥayyim in 'The Book of Asatir', Tarbiz 14 (1943), 104–125, 174–190; Tarbiẕ 15 (1944), 71–87. An Arabic translation was also made of the text, as also a Samaritan modern Hebrew translation, called Pitron. An English translation of the Samaritan modern Hebrew translation, Pitron, was made by Gaster.

The Asatir is often cited by 17th and 18th-century Arabic authors, Muslim al-Danār and Ibrahim al-Ayya, in their Bible commentaries.

== See also ==
- Book of Joshua (Samaritan)
- Chronicles of Jerahmeel
- Tolidah
- Samaritan Pentateuch
