= Ashur (Bible) =

Son of Shem

- Parent: Shem

Ashur (אַשּׁוּר ʾAššūr) was the second son of Shem, the son of Noah. Ashur's brothers were Elam, Arphaxad, Lud, and Aram.

== Status as a city builder ==
Prior to the discovery of the Dead Sea Scrolls, there was contention in academic circles regarding whether Ashur or Nimrod built the Assyrian cities of Nineveh, Resen, Rehoboth-Ir and Calah, since the name Ashur can refer to both the person and the country (compare Genesis 10:8–12 AV and Genesis 10:8–12 ESV). Sir Walter Raleigh devoted several pages in his History of the World (c. 1616) to reciting past scholarship regarding the question of whether it had been Nimrod or Ashur who built the cities in Assyria. Both the JPS Tanakh 1917 and the 1611 King James Bible clarify the language of the Septuagint and Vulgate translations of Genesis 10:11-12, by explicitly crediting Ashur as the founder of the cities of Nineveh, Rehoboth, Calah, and Resen.

== Book of Jubilees ==
The Ge'ez version of the Book of Jubilees, affirmed by the 15 Jubilees scrolls found amongst the Dead Sea Scrolls, affirms that the contested lands in Genesis 10:8–12 were apportioned to Ashur. Jubilees 9:3 states,

"And for Ashur came forth the second Portion, all the land of Ashur and Nineveh and Shinar and to the border of India, and it ascends and skirts the river."

== Flavius Josephus ==
The 1st century Judaeo-Roman historian Flavius Josephus also gives the following statement:

"Ashur lived at the city of Nineveh; and named his subjects Assyrians, who became the most fortunate nation, beyond others" (Antiquities, i, vi, 4).

== Sons in mediaeval Jewish texts ==
According to the Mediaeval Jewish text or midrash Sefer HaYashar, Asshur had sons called Mirus and Mokil.

Another text, Chronicles of Jerahmeel, gives the names of Asshur's sons as Gezrôn and Ishai.

== See also ==
- Ashuri
- Assyrian people
