= Arpachshad =

In the Bible, son of Shem, the son of Noah

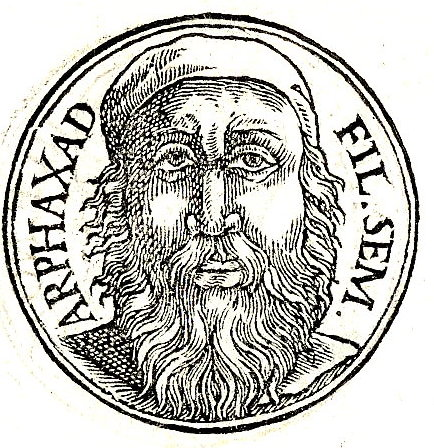
- Arpachshad imagined in the Promptuarium Iconum Insigniorum
- Died: (aged 438)
- Children: Selah, and other sons and daughters
- Parent: Shem

Arpachshad (Biblical Hebrew: אַרְפַּכְשַׁד, romanized: ʾArpaḵšaḏ, in pausa אַרְפַּכְשָׁד ʾArpaḵšāḏ; Koine Greek: Ἀρφαξάδ, romanized: Arphaksád), alternatively spelled Arphaxad or Arphacsad, was one of the five sons of Shem, the son of Noah in the Hebrew Bible mentioned in the Generations of Noah in the Book of Genesis (Genesis 10:22, 24 and 11:10-13) and in 1 Chronicles 1:17-18. His brothers were Elam, Asshur, Lud and Aram; he is an ancestor of Abraham. He is said in Genesis 11:10 to have been born two years after the Flood, when Shem was 100.

His name appears in later books, including the New Testament's Gospel of Luke.

== Biblical accounts ==
According to the Book of Genesis, he was one of the five sons of Shem, Noah's son. He is the twelfth name of the Genealogies of Genesis that trace Abraham's ancestry from Adam to Terah; this is also mentioned in Luke 3:36–38. Beginning with Adam, nine Antediluvian names are given that predate Noah and the Flood, and nine postdiluvian, beginning with Noah's eldest son Shem and ending with Terah.

According to the text, Arpachshad's brothers were Elam, Asshur, Lud, and Aram. Arpachshad's son is called Selah, except in the Septuagint, where his son is Cainan, Shelah being Arpachshad's grandson. Cainan is also identified as Arpachshad's son in Luke 3:36 and in the Book of Jubilees:1. Jubilees additionally identifies Arpachshad's wife as רצויה rṣwyh, the daughter of Shushan, who was the son (or daughter in some versions) of Shem's older son, Elam. Shushan was the capital of ancient Elam. Arpachshad's mother is named in this source as צדקת לבב, possibly Ṣaḏeqeṯ-lābāb 'Righteous one (f) of the Heart'.

== Identifications ==
Some ancient Jewish sources, particularly Jubilees, point to Arpachshad as the immediate progenitor of Ura and Kesed, who allegedly founded the city of Ur of the Chaldees, and inherited lands on the west bank of the Euphrates (Jubilees 9:4; 11:1–7) – the same bank where Ur, identified by Leonard Woolley in 1927 as Ur of the Chaldees, is located. Until Woolley's identification of Ur, Arpachshad was understood by many Jewish and Muslim scholars to be an area in Upper Mesopotamia. This led to the identification of Arpachshad with Urfa (due to similarities in the names ארפ־כשד and כשדים) – a land associated with the Chalybes, whom Josephus confused with the Chaldeans. Donald B. Redford identified Arpachshad with Babylon.

== Another Arpaxad ==
Another Arpaxad is referenced in the deuterocanonical Book of Judith as a king of the Medes, and if this supposed Median king is contemporary with the conquest of the Assyrians, he could be identified with Phraortes (c. 665 - 633 BC). If he is contemporary with Nebuchadnezzar II (named as king of the Assyrians in Judith), he might be identified with Cyaxares (r. 625–585 BC).
