= Eleazar ben Asher ha-Levi =

Eleazar ben Asher ha-Levi (Lipman of Osnabrück) was a 14th-century Ashkenazi Jewish chronicler and compiler of the Sefer ha-Zikhronot who lived in the Rhineland region of Germany. Also known as the Sefer ha-Zikaron or Book of Memory/Memories/Remembrance, it was completed around 1335.

== Biography ==
Eleazar was from a Rhenish family of Torah scholars. Eleazar's father was likely Asher b. Ya'akov of Osnabrück, a copyist and compiler who glossed the Sefer Arukh. Eleazar had a son Uri born December 10, 1336. Uri is called Vivus in German archival sources and went to Cologne after the Black Death in 1372 and became community leader in Dortmund. Uri's son Asher or Anselm became chief rabbi of the Holy Roman Empire in 1435, while his son Ya'akov served as a synagogue functionary and Efrayim also was a minor copyist in Cologne in 1413.

== Sefer ha-Zikhronot ==
Eli Yassif wrote that Sefer ha-Zikhronot constitutes the "greatest, most encompassing, and diverse literary anthology of the Jewish Middle Ages that we know of," and it strove to create "an encompassing historical picture of the world and the Jewish people" and a "universal history." An anthologist and copyist, his work was later translated by Moses Gaster and retitled as the Chronicles of Jerahmeel after the author of one of the collected works. It is a collection of other texts such as the Yosippon.

Eleazar interpolated his own comments into the work of Jerahmeel or Yerahme'el ben Solomon, an 11th-12th-century Italian chronicler, and Yosippon. The manuscript is in the Bodleian Library. It also contains the Book of Daniel, the Alexander Romance, parts of the Apocrypha, and treatises on biology, the calendar, mineralogy, and poems and liturgy. He writes that he "wrote these events in a book... so that the readers will see, comprehend, and know the truth of some of the acts committed beneath the sky, and some of the trials and tribulations to find our fathers in their exile... lest their descendants forget. Therefore, I named this book the Book of Memory... as I have collected in this Book of Memory all that has happened and all that has been done from the creation of the world until today."
