= Juynboll =

Juynboll is a surname. Notable people with the surname include:

- G. H. A. Juynboll (1935–2010), Dutch scholar of Islam specializing in hadith studies
- Theodor Juynboll (1802–1861), Dutch Reformed theologian and oriental philologist
