= Radwa Mount =

Mountain in Saudi Arabia

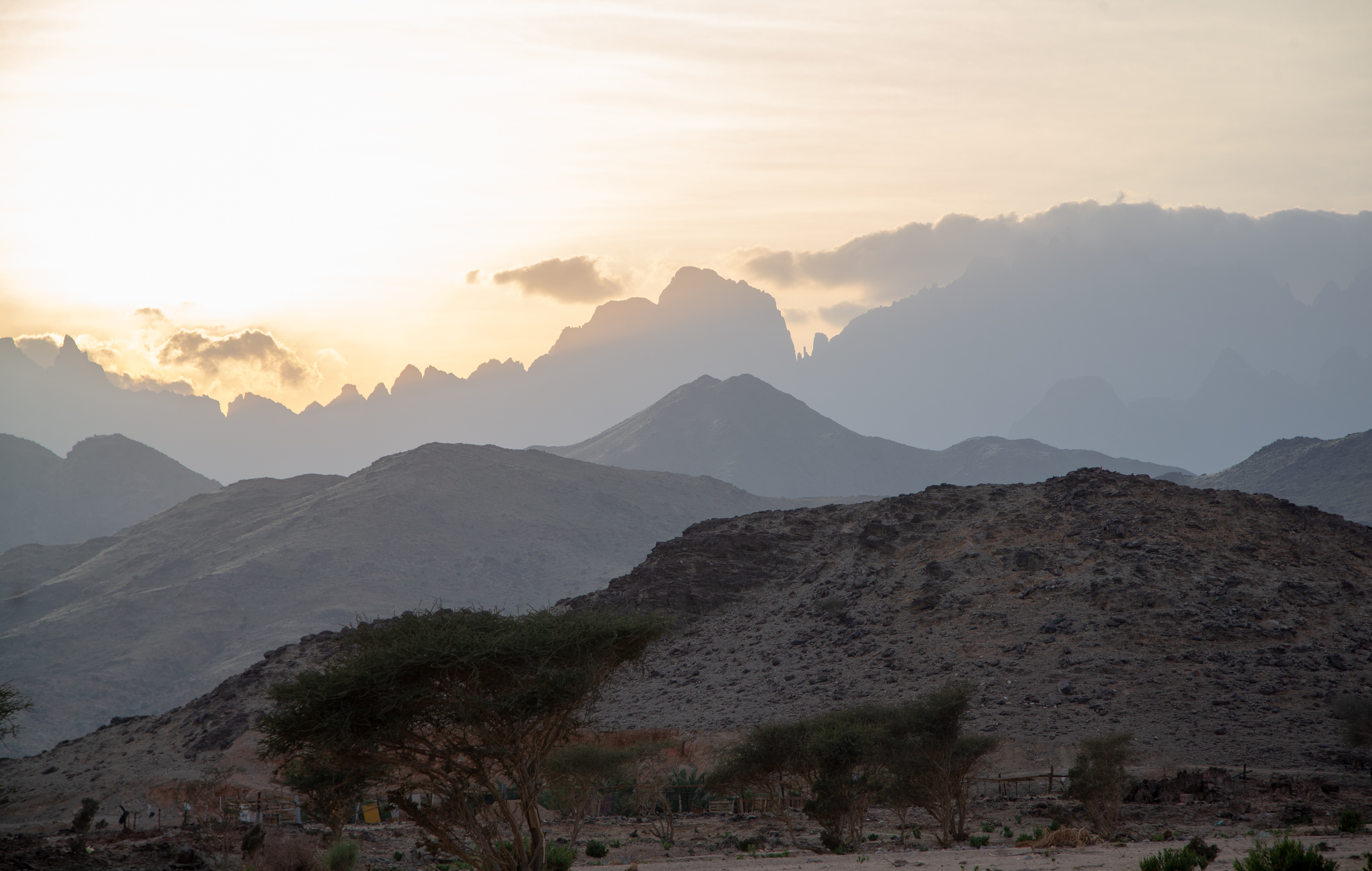
Radwa Mount

Radwa Mount is located in one of Yanbu's villages called Rakhou, which is in Al Medina area in the west of Saudi Arabia. This mountain is well known for its height, beauty and popularity. Radwa Mount consists of many mountains in one mount and it's one of Yanbu Al Nakhil Mountains. The mountain covers over 120 square kilometers and is over 27 kilometers long from the east to the west. Its highest mountain is 2282 meters high according to Places Names in Saudi Arabia' encyclopedia, page 57. Several mountains are over 868 meters tall.

== Wildlife ==
In Radwa mountain there are a lot of traditional bee cells that are inherited by young people from the parents and grandparents which still produce high quality honey from wild pure flowers. There are some kind of plants : wild mint, arar, shohat, alshath, albasham, palm and alkhazam. The birds that live in Radwa mountain include partridge, lunar, pigeon in addition to falcon and eagle. Also there are various wild animals like ibex, gazelle, leopard, wolf and lynx.

== History ==
Radwa Mountain has caught the attention of many writers and historians who passed through the city of Yanbu. It had a great influence on their writings and poetry by its glory and its bright red color. Aram asulamy, who was an expert on Arabian country topics and wrote the book "Tehama mountain names and mekkah and Madinah Mountains", wrote many poems about it. Radwa is the first mountains of Tehama. The destination is one day travel from Yanbu and 7 days from Madinah.

The famous historian Khaireddin Zarkali who passed the city of Yanbu in 1930, reached the mountain and said:" Radwa mountain on the left of Madinah. It appears to have branches like a bike planted with various heights on the top of the mountain.I stood there and meditated and it crossed my mind the poet's lines:" they irrigated me and said not to sing, if they had irrigated the Radwa racemes, it would have sung " What makes Radaw Mountain even more famous is using it in many old proverbs to describe heaviness. They say "something is heavier than Radwa" meaning "it is very heavy". Some of the most famous poets whom mentioned Radwa Mountain in their poems are: Hassan ibn Thabit, Al-Mutanabbi, and Abu Al-Alaa Al-Ma'arri.
