= Al-Ajrad =

Mountain in Medina, Saudi Arabia

Al-Ajrad Mountain
- Medina Region Saudi Arabia

Highest point
- Coordinates: 24°41′03″N 38°47′59″E

Geography
- Location: Al-Ajrad Mountain located near Medina – Saudi Arabia

Al-Ajrad is a mountain located in the northwest of Medina, about 90 kilometers from it, to the northeast of Yanbu, about 100 kilometers from it. Buwat Valley is located below it. It is called Al-Ajrad (hairless) because it is stripped of vegetation and has few trees, which is the opposite of the Al-Ashaar (hairy), which is dotted with trees.

== Overview ==
Al-Ajrad is one of Juhaynah's two mountains, Al-Ajrad and Al-Ashaar. Now inhabited by the Juhaynah tribe, the two mountains form a mountain range with a height of about 1280 meters, which is located west of the city and Radwa Mountain. The waters of Al-Ajrad flow into Al Hemed Valley from the north. The mountain was mentioned in Muhammed's hadith, on the authority of Abdullah ibn Salman al-Aghar, on the authority of Nafi, from Abdullah ibn Umar, that Muhammed said: "If temptations arise, you should go to the two mountains of Juhaynah". Abu Ali al-Hijri said: I found the description of the two mountains, Al-Ashaar and Al-Ajrad, the two mountains of Juhaynah, I quoted it for the hadith that Muhammad talked regarding safety in the temptations. It is mentioned in Al-Tabqaqat al-Kubra book: "For the two mountains of Juhaynah, Al-Ashaar, and Al-Ajrad, they are two mountains of paradise that will not be touched by temptations".

== What historians have mentioned ==
- Al-Bakri al-Andalusi said: Al-Ajrad is one of the two mountains of Juhaynah, and the other is Al-Ashaar, after which their valleys are named. Al-Ajrad comes after Buwat Al-Gelasi, and there are two valleys in Buwat. From the valleys of Al-Ajrud that flow in Al-Gelasi: Mabkatha, which is in front of Buwat valley. Mabkatha is followed by Rashad, which flows into Edam, it was named Ghawa, according to Juhaynah, so Muhammad named it Rashad, and it is for the tribe of Dinar, the brothers of Al-Rabaa. After Rashad is Alhadera, which has the tomb of Abdulaziz ibn Muhammad ibn Abdulaziz ibn Umar ibn Abdulrahman ibn Awf, and also a water spring. Albaly is down streaming on Alhadera, where there are also palm trees, and it belonged to Muhammad ibn Ibrahim Allahabi, then next to Alhadera is Taborz, which has small springs: A spring belonging to Abdullah ibn Muhammad ibn Imran al-Talhi, called Alazanbah, Al Dhaleel of Mubarak Al Turki, and other springs that dissipate in the mountain. From the valleys of Al-Ajrad that flow into Al-Ghor is Hazar, and it is for Gasham tribe, and Rahet for Malek tribe, which Abu Dhu'ayb says about it: " It was the crown of people of Hazar and the waters of Juhaynah at Al-Ajrad: The well of Bani Sabaa, and the well of Hawatka, which in Zaqab Al-Shatan, and was mentioned by Ktheir. And it is in between the spring of Hashim tribe, which is in Malal, and the spring in Edam.
- Al-Askandari said: Al-Ashaar and Al-Ajrad are two mountains of Juhaynah between Medina and the Levant.
- Yaqut al-Hamawi said: A place where there is no vegetation. On the authority of Abu al-Qasim Mahmud, on the authority of Sayyid Ali al-Alawi, he has a mention in the hadith of Hijrah from Muhammad ibn Ishaq. Also, Nasr said: Al-Ashaar and Al-Ajrad are two mountains of Juhaynah between Medina and the Levant.
- Abdulmumin al-Baghdadi said: It is devoid of vegetation: A mountain among the tribal mountains. It was said: Al-Ajrad and Al-Ashaar are two mountains of Juhaynah between Madinah and the Levant.
- Al-Samhudi said: Al-Abjar tribe, which is Khadra bin Ouf bin al-Harith bin al-Khazraj, the brothers of the Khadara tribe, went out and inhabited their house which is known as Bani Khadra. They inhabited a mountain called Al-Ajrad, where there is a well owned by Malik ibn Sinan, the grandfather of Abu Sa'id al-Khudri. Ibn Hazm mentioned that Al-Harith ibn Al-Khazraj the elder had a son named Al-Khazraj ibn Al-Harith, also said: that some of his sons traveled to the Levant with Ghassan, so they were not among the Ansar, and then he called those who remained Ansar. Al-Samhudi also said: Al-Ajrad is a mountain belonging to Khadra tribe at Busa, and a mountain belonging to Jahinah with Buwat Al-Gelasi with also Al-Ashaar mountain and Al-Ajrad is located before Madalaja Ta'ahn.
- Shurab said: "It was mentioned on the path of Muhammad's migration: The investigators said: This is a misrepresentation, but the mountain on the way of migration is Ajaired with diminutive. As for Al-Ajrad, it is a large mountain west of the city, surrounded by Edam from the east and north and seventy-five kilometers from the city, It is far from the migration route. Al-Ajrad is the mountain whose well is called Albusa and belonged to some of the Khazraj people and also belonged to Malik bin Sinan, the father of Abu Sa'id al-Khudri.
- Al-Baladi Al-Harbi said: Ajrad is without vegetation. According to the text: Then he took them to Al-Jadjad, then on the Al-Ajrad. Today it is known by the diminutive Ajaired, a branch flows into Thaqib valley, and Thaqib is one of the tributaries of Al-Qahah, with Al-Madalaj, on the old path of migration that has been deserted. These places are located about 160 kilometers south of the city, close to Al-Far'a Valley, and the waters flow into it.
- Hamad Jasser said: Al-Ajrad, is one of the villages of Shujwa in the Medina region.

== See also ==
- List of mountains in Saudi Arabia
