= Book of Joshua (Samaritan) =

Book of Joshua in the Samaritan religion

The Book of Joshua, sometimes called the Samaritan Chronicle, is a Samaritan chronicle so called because the greater part of it is devoted to the history of Joshua. It is extant in two divergent recensions, one in Samaritan Hebrew and the other in Arabic.

Though a large part describes traditions parallel to those of the canonical Jewish Book of Joshua, it differs greatly from the latter in both form and content. As well, the Samaritans do not hold it to be of divine inspiration, although "they greatly revere it and hold it in the highest estimation, and believe it to contain a true and authentic history of the period of which it treats." The Arabic recension was redacted between the fourteenth and sixteenth centuries. The editio princeps is a published Arabic manuscript written in the Samaritan alphabet, with a Latin translation and a long preface by T. W. Juynboll (Leyden, 1848). A Samaritan Hebrew version was published in 1908 by Moses Gaster.

The book is divided into fifty chapters, and contains, after the account of Joshua, a brief description of the period following Joshua, agreeing to that extent with the Book of Judges, and covering early Israelite history until Eli leaves Shechem and the sanctuary in Shiloh is established. The last six chapters discuss the Babylonian exile and Samaritan history up to Baba Rabba, including Alexander the Great, and the revolt against Hadrian.

The text should not be viewed as "an abbreviated, rewritten MT version". The text emphasizes throughout a belief in the sanctity of Mount Gerizim, the site of the Samaritan temple; for example, Joshua 9:27 calls Gerizim "the chosen place" and describes construction of the temple following the conclusion of the conquest of Canaan.

== The manuscript ==
The manuscript from which Juynboll prepared his edition was the property of Joseph Justus Scaliger, who, it is supposed, obtained it from the Egyptian Samaritans in 1584. Later, it was studied by Johann Heinrich Hottinger, who described it in his Exercitationes anti-Morinianæ (1644, pp. 109–116) and in his Smegma Orientale (1657). Two other manuscripts (in the British Museum and at Trinity College, Cambridge) have since come to Europe. An English translation of Juynboll's text has been made by Oliver Turnbull Crane ("The Samaritan Chronicle or Book of Joshua," New York, 1890).

== Date and authorship ==
Contrary to Reland, Juynboll (preface to his edition) concluded that the Samaritan Joshua was the work of one author, who did not live later than the thirteenth century, basing his conclusion on the fact that Abu'l-Fath, who wrote in 1355, drew from it much material for his own chronicle. It is also quoted by Maqrizi (d. 1441).

Crane (1889) refers in his preface to Juynboll's "conclusion that it has been redacted into its present form about 1300 AD, out of earlier documents", a conclusion also shared by Crane.

== Sources ==
Juynboll concluded that the author compiled the work from four sources—one Samaritan Hebrew (the basis of the first twenty-four chapters) and three Arabic. The Hebrew-Samaritan source is based upon the Septuagint translation of Joshua. A Hebrew résumé of the story of Shaubak (ch. xxvi.–xxxvii.) was inserted in Abraham Zacuto's Sefer Yuhasin by Samuel Shullam, who declared that he found it in a Samaritan chronicle (Sefer Zikronot shel Kutim), where it is said to have been taken from a Jewish Midrash. It is evident that Shullam saw it in an Arabic work, probably the Samaritan Book of Joshua, for he reads "Yaniah" instead of "Nabih," a change possible only if the original was in Arabic characters (reading ينيح for نبيح). Samuel Shullam's résumé was copied afterward by ibn Yahya, in his "Shalshelet ha-Kabbalah," and by Reuben Hoshke, in his "Yalqut Re'ubeni" (section "Devarim").

== See also ==
- The Asatir
- Tolidah
