= Samareitikon =

Greek translation of the Samaritan Pentateuch

The Samareitikon (Greek: τὸ Σαμαρειτικὸν) is the name given to the Greek translation of the Samaritan Pentateuch.

The Samareitikon is obtained only from marginal notes in other manuscripts and quotations in Origen. As Samuel Kohn has shown, these passages show dependencies on the Samaritan Targum. According to Emanuel Tov, however, it is only an early revision of the Septuagint text, which could also be a Samaritan version of the Septuagint. This thesis may be supported by the text version of an inscription found in Thessaloniki with the Aaronic blessing Book of Numbers 6,22-27 in a building in the 4th century Samaritan synagogue.

== See also ==
- Samaritan Pentateuch § Translations
