= Samaritan Pentateuch =

Samaritan version of the Torah

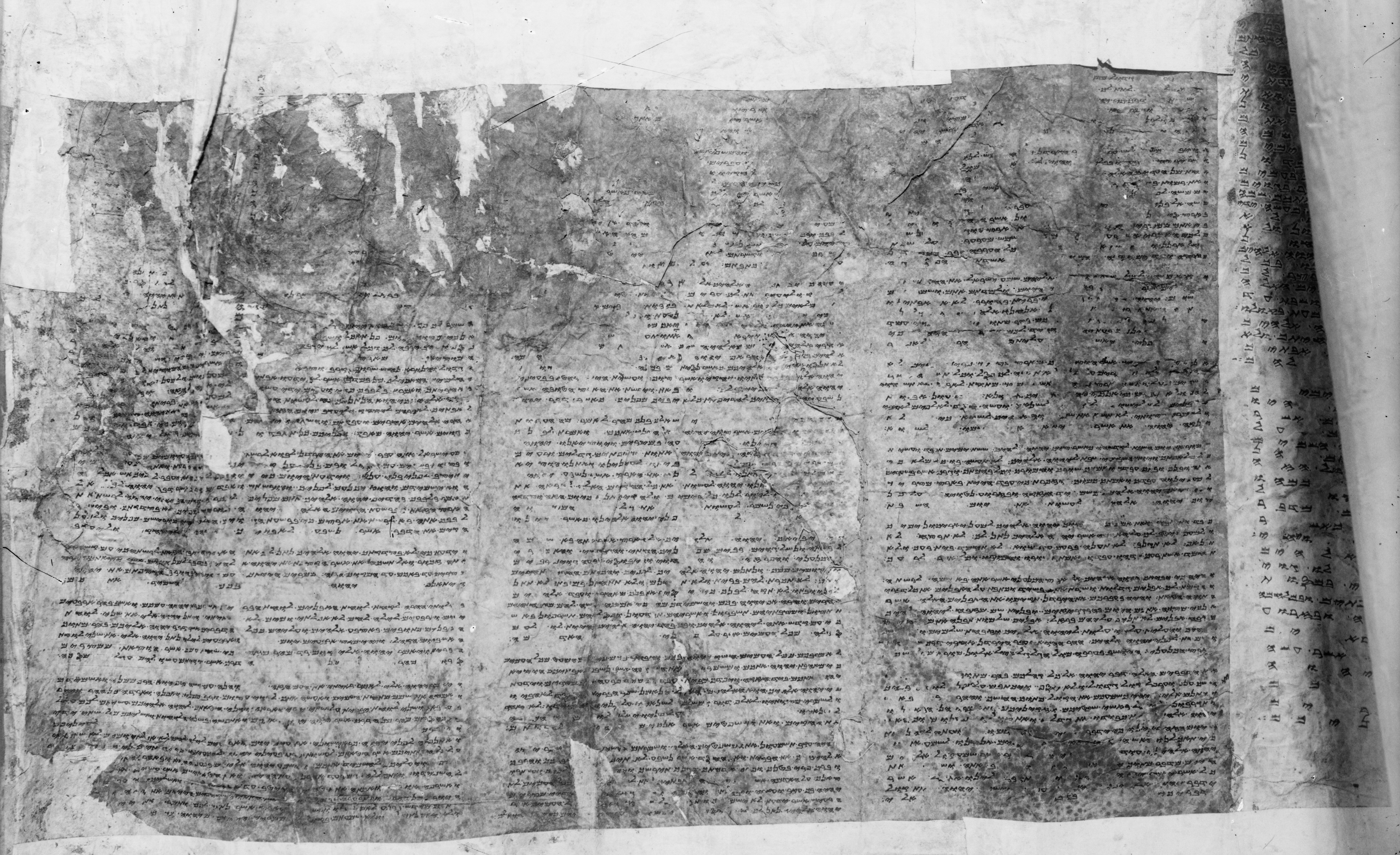
Detail of the Samaritan Pentateuch's oldest scroll, written in Samaritan Hebrew (Nablus, c. 1900–1920)

The Samaritan Pentateuch, also called the Samaritan Torah (Samaritan Hebrew: ࠕࠦࠅࠓࠡࠄ, Tūrā), is the sacred scripture of the Samaritans. Written in the Samaritan script, it dates back to one of the ancient versions of the Torah that existed during the Second Temple period. It constitutes the entire biblical canon in Samaritanism.

Some 6,000 differences exist between the Samaritan and the Jewish Masoretic Text. Most are minor variations in the spelling of words or grammatical constructions, but others involve significant semantic changes, such as the uniquely Samaritan commandment to construct an altar on Mount Gerizim. Nearly 2,000 of these textual variations agree with the Koine Greek Septuagint, and some are shared with the Latin Vulgate. Throughout their history, Samaritans have used translations of the Samaritan Pentateuch into Aramaic, Greek, and Arabic, as well as liturgical and exegetical works based upon it.

It first became known to the Western world in 1631, proving the first example of the Samaritan alphabet and sparking an intense theological debate regarding its relative age versus the Masoretic Text. This first published copy, much later labelled as Codex B by August von Gall, became the source of most Western critical editions of the Samaritan Pentateuch until the latter half of the 20th century; today the codex is held in the Bibliothèque nationale de France. Some Pentateuchal manuscripts discovered among the Dead Sea Scrolls have been identified as bearing a "pre-Samaritan" text type.

== Origin and canonical significance ==
=== Samaritan traditions ===
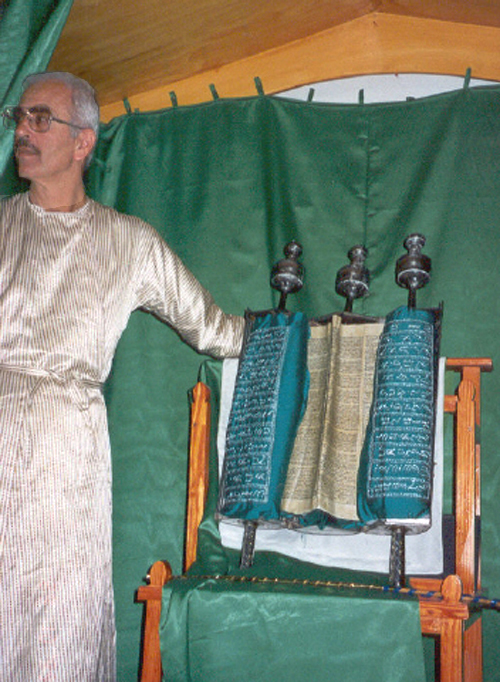
Samaritan and the Samaritan Torah

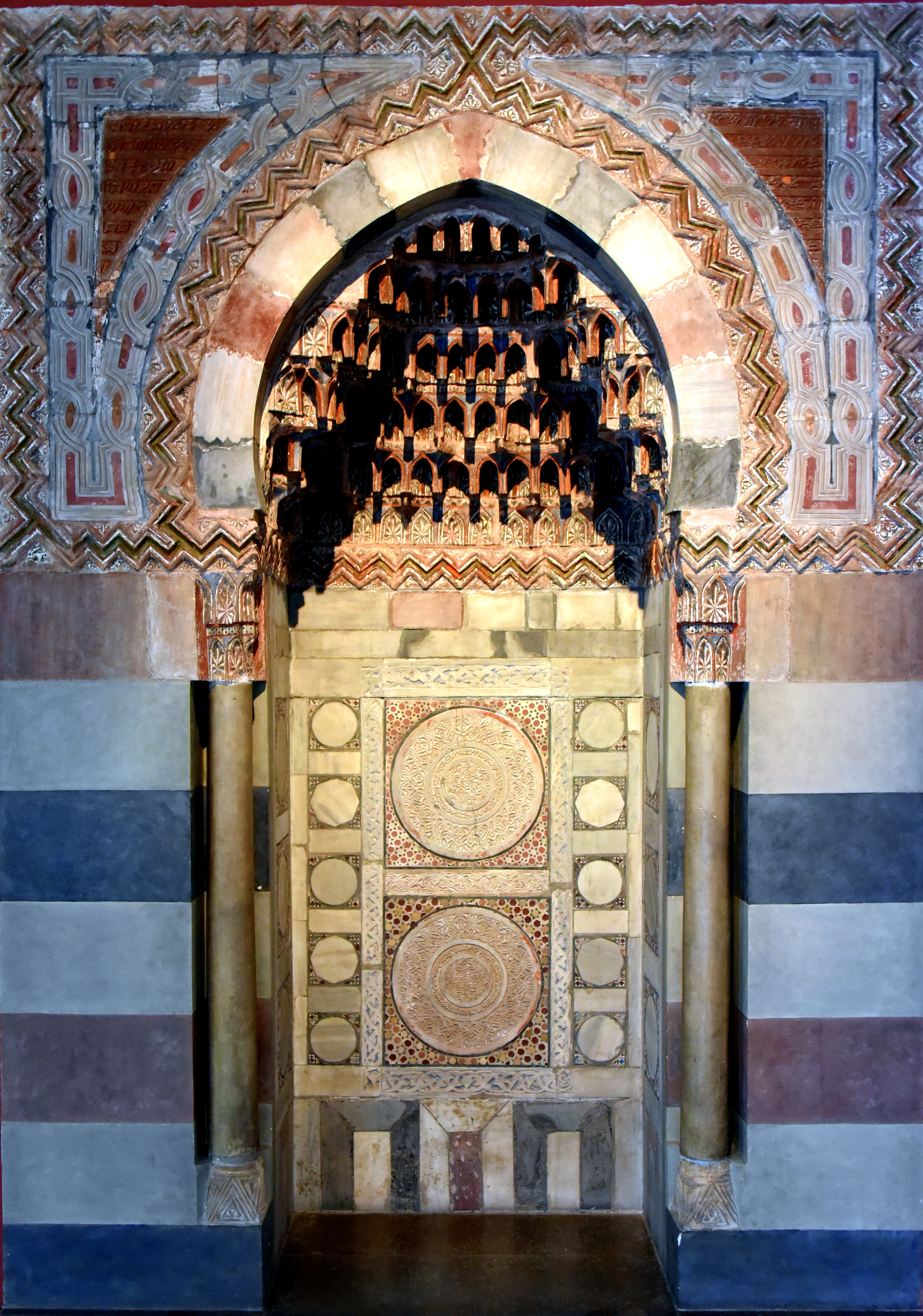
Quotations from the Torah in Samaritan script. Niche from a Samaritan's house in Damascus, Syria (15th–16th century CE). Islamic Art Museum, Berlin.

Samaritans believe that God authored their Pentateuch and gave Moses the first copy along with the two tablets containing the Ten Commandments. They believe that they preserve this divinely composed text uncorrupted to the present day. Samaritans commonly refer to their Pentateuch as ࠒࠅࠔࠈࠄ (Qušṭā, 'Truth').

Samaritans include only the Pentateuch in their biblical canon. They do not recognize divine authorship or inspiration in any other book in the Jewish Tanakh. A Samaritan Book of Joshua partly based upon the Tanakh's Book of Joshua exists, but Samaritans regard it as a non-canonical secular historical chronicle.

According to a view based on the biblical Book of Ezra (Ezra 4:11), the Samaritans are the people of Samaria who parted ways with the people of Judah (the Judahites) in the Persian period. The Samaritans believe that it was not them, but the Jews, who separated from the authentic stream of the Israelite tradition and law, around the time of Eli, in the 11th century BCE.

=== Scholarly perspective ===
Modern scholarship connects the formation of the Samaritan community with events which followed the Babylonian captivity. One view is that the Samaritans are the people of the Kingdom of Israel who separated from the Kingdom of Judah. Another view is that the event happened somewhere around 432 BCE, when Manasseh, the son-in-law of Sanballat the Horonite, founded a community in Samaria, as related in the Book of Nehemiah 13:28 and Antiquities of the Jews by Josephus. Josephus, however, dates this event and the building of the temple at Shechem to the time of Alexander the Great. Others believe that the real schism between the peoples did not take place until Hasmonean times, when the Temple on Mount Gerizim was destroyed in 128 BCE by John Hyrcanus.

The script of the Samaritan Pentateuch, its close connections at many points with the Septuagint, and its even closer agreements with the present Masoretic Text, all suggest a date about 122 BCE. Excavation work undertaken since 1982 by Yitzhak Magen has firmly dated the temple structures on Gerizim to the middle of the 5th century BCE, built by Sanballat the Horonite, a contemporary of Ezra and Nehemiah, who lived more than 100 years before the Sanballat mentioned by Josephus.

The adoption of the Pentateuch as the sacred text of the Samaritans before their final schism with the Judean Jewish community provides evidence that it was already widely accepted as a canonical authority in that region.

== Comparison with other versions ==
=== Masoretic Text ===
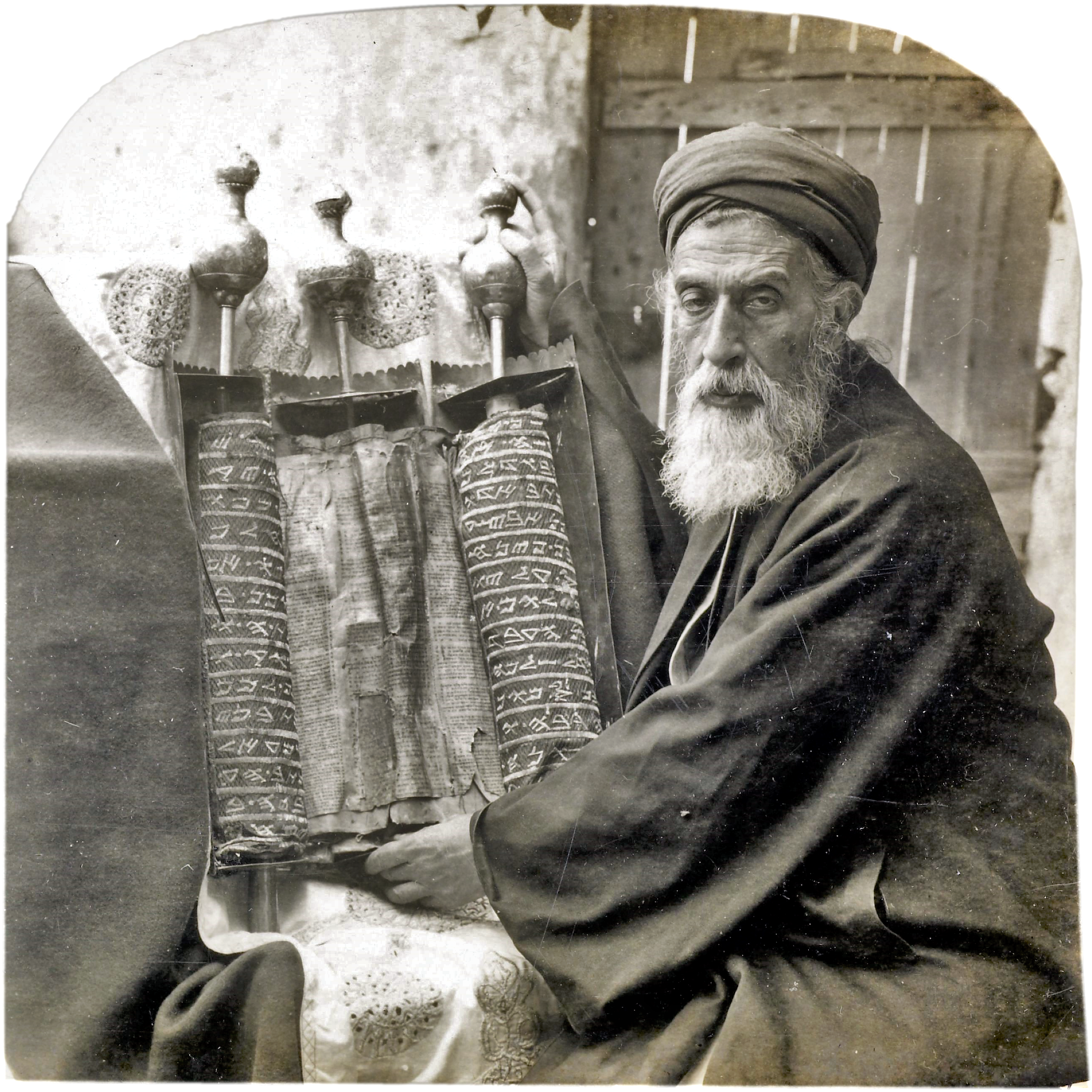
Samaritan High Priest and Abisha Scroll, 1905

Manuscripts of the Samaritan Pentateuch are written in a different script than the one used in the Masoretic Pentateuch. The Samaritan text is written with the Samaritan alphabet, derived from the Paleo-Hebrew alphabet used by the Israelite community prior to the Babylonian captivity. During the exile in Babylon, Jews adopted the Ashuri script, based on the Babylonians' Aramaic alphabet, which was developed into the modern Hebrew alphabet. Originally, all manuscripts of the Samaritan Pentateuch consisted of unvocalized text written using only the letters of the Samaritan alphabet. Beginning in the 12th century, some manuscripts show a partial vocalization resembling the Jewish Tiberian vocalization used in Masoretic manuscripts. More recently, manuscripts have been produced with full vocalization. The Samaritan Pentateuchal text is divided into 904 paragraphs. Divisions between sections of text are marked with various combinations of lines, dots or an asterisk; a dot is used to indicate the separation between words.

The London Polyglot lists 6,000 instances where the Samaritan Pentateuch differs from the Masoretic text. As different printed editions of the Samaritan Pentateuch are based upon different sets of manuscripts, the precise number varies significantly from one edition to another. Only a minority of such differences are significant. Most are simply spelling differences, usually concerning Hebrew letters of similar appearance; the use of more matres lectionis (symbols indicating vowels) in the Samaritan Pentateuch, compared with the Masoretic; different placement of words in a sentence; and the replacement of some verbal constructions with equivalent ones. A comparison between both versions shows a preference in the Samaritan version for the Hebrew preposition al where the Masoretic text has el.

The most notable substantial differences between both texts are those related to Mount Gerizim, the Samaritans' place of worship. The Samaritan version of the Ten Commandments count as nine commandments what others count as ten, and include as the tenth the command that an altar be built on Mount Gerizim on which all sacrifices should be offered. The Samaritan Pentateuch contains the following paragraph, which is absent from the Jewish version:

And when it so happens that LORD God brings you to the land of Canaan, which you are coming to possess, you shall set up there for you great stones and plaster them with plaster and you write on the stones all words of this law. And it becomes for you that across the Jordan you shall raise these stones, which I command you today, in mountain Gerizim. And you build there the altar to the LORD God of you. Altar of stones. Not you shall wave on them iron. With whole stones you shall build the altar to LORD God of you. And you bring on it ascend offerings to LORD God of you, and you sacrifice peace offerings, and you eat there and you rejoice before the face of the LORD God of you. The mountain this is across the Jordan behind the way of the rising of the sun, in the land of Canaan who is dwelling in the desert before the Galgal, beside Alvin-Mara, before Sechem.

Another important difference is in Deuteronomy 27:4. According to the Jewish text, the Israelites were told to enter the Promised Land and build an altar on Mount Ebal, while the Samaritan text says that such altar, the first built by the Israelites in the Promised Land, should be built on Mount Gerizim. A few verses afterwards, both the Jewish and the Samaritan texts contain instructions for the Israelites to perform two ceremonies upon entering the Promised Land: one of blessings, to be held on Mount Gerizim, and one of cursings, to take place on Mount Ebal. In 1946, the Dead Sea Scrolls were discovered, which include the oldest known versions of the Torah. In Deuteronomy 27:4–7, the Dead Sea scroll fragments bring "Gerizim" instead of "Ebal", indicating that the Samaritan version was likely the original reading.

Other differences between the Samaritan and the Masoretic (Jewish) texts include:

- In Numbers 12:1, the Samaritan Pentateuch refers to Moses' wife as kaashet, which translates as 'the beautiful woman', while the Jewish version and the Jewish commentaries suggest that the word used was Kushi, meaning 'black woman' or 'Cushite woman'. For the Samaritans, therefore, Moses had only one wife, Zipporah, throughout his whole life, while Jewish sources generally understand that Moses had two wives, Zipporah and a second, unnamed Cushite woman.
- The Samaritan Pentateuch uses less anthropomorphic language in descriptions of God, with intermediaries performing actions that the Jewish version attributes directly to God. Where the Jewish text describes Yahweh as a "man of war" (Exodus 15:3), the Samaritan has "hero of war", a phrase applied to spiritual beings.
- In Numbers 23:4, the Samaritan text reads "The Angel of God found Balaam", in contrast with the Jewish text, which reads "And God met Balaam."
- In Genesis 50:23, the Jewish text says that Joseph's grandchildren were born "upon the knees of Joseph", while the Samaritan text says they were born "in the days of Joseph".
- In about 34 instances, the Samaritan Pentateuch has repetitions in one section of text that was also found in other parts of the Pentateuch. Such repetitions are also implied or presupposed in the Jewish text, but not explicitly recorded in it. For example, the Samaritan text in the Book of Exodus on multiple occasions records Moses repeating to Pharaoh exactly what God had previously instructed Moses to tell him, which makes the text look repetitious, in comparison with the Jewish text. In other occasions, the Samaritan Pentateuch has subjects, prepositions, particles, appositives, including the repetition of words and phrases within a single passage, that are absent from the Jewish text.

=== Septuagint and Latin Vulgate ===
The Samaritan Torah contains frequent agreements with the Septuagint and the Latin Vulgate. The Septuagint text agrees with the Samaritan version in approximately 1,900 of the 6,000 instances in which it differs from the Masoretic text. Many of these agreements reflect inconsequential grammatical details, but some are significant. For example, Exodus 12:40 in both the Samaritan and the Septuagint reads:

Now the sojourning of the children of Israel and of their fathers which they had dwelt in the land of Canaan and in Egypt was four hundred and thirty years.

In the Masoretic text, the passage reads:

Now the sojourning of the children of Israel, who dwelt in Egypt, was four hundred and thirty years.

Passages in the Latin Vulgate also show agreements with the Samaritan version, in contrast with the Masoretic version. For instance, in Genesis 22:2, the Samaritan Pentateuch places the binding and near-sacrifice of Isaac in the "land of Moreh" (Hebrew: מוראה), while the Jewish Pentateuch has "land of Moriah" (Hebrew: מריה). The Samaritan "Moreh" describes the region around Shechem and modern-day Nablus, where Mount Gerizim is situated, while Jews claim the land is the same as Mount Moriah in Jerusalem. The Vulgate translates this phrase as in terram visionis ('in the land of vision') which implies that Jerome was familiar with the reading 'Moreh', a Hebrew word whose triliteral root suggests 'vision.'

== Evaluations of its relevance for textual criticism ==
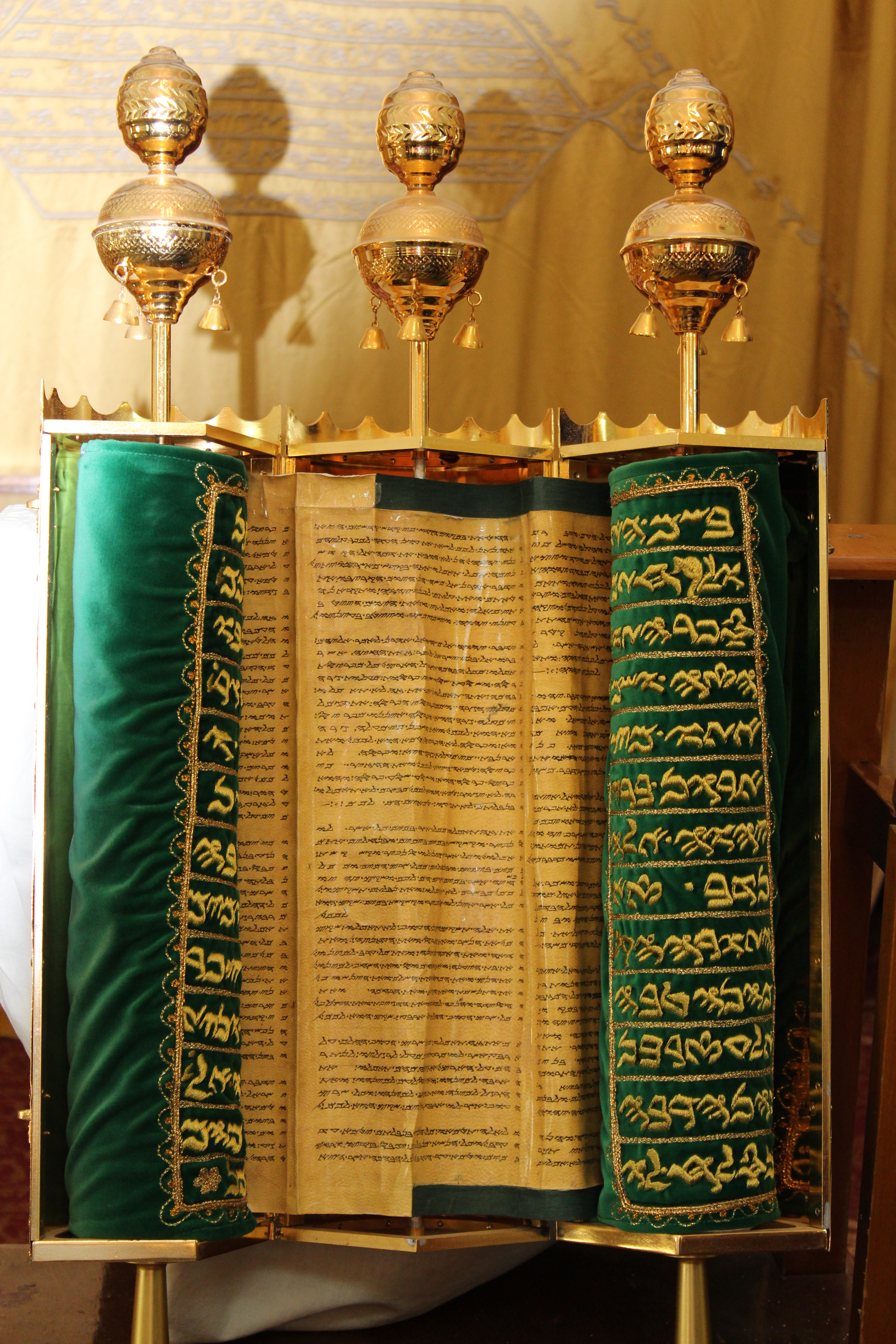
Samaritan Torah scrolls preserved in the Samaritan synagogue on Mount Gerizim

The earliest recorded assessments of the Samaritan Pentateuch are found in rabbinic literature and the writings of the early Christian Church Fathers of the first millennium. The Talmud records Eleazar ben Simeon, a Rabbinic Jew, condemning the Samaritan scribes: "You have falsified your Pentateuch... and you have not profited aught by it."

Some early Christian writers found the Samaritan Pentateuch useful for textual criticism. Cyril of Alexandria, Procopius of Gaza, and others spoke of certain words missing from the Hebrew Text but present in the Samaritan Pentateuch. Eusebius writes the "Greek translation [of the Bible] also differs from the Hebrew, though not so much from the Samaritan" and notes that the Septuagint agrees with the Samaritan Pentateuch in the number of years elapsed from Noah's Flood to Abraham. Christian interest in the Samaritan Pentateuch fell into neglect during the Middle Ages.

The publication of a manuscript of the Samaritan Pentateuch in 17th-century Europe reawakened interest in the text and fueled a controversy between Protestants and Roman Catholics over which Old Testament textual traditions are authoritative. Roman Catholics showed a particular interest in the study of the Samaritan Pentateuch on account of the antiquity of the text and its frequent agreements with the Septuagint and the Latin Vulgate. Some Catholics including Jean Morin argue that the Samaritan Pentateuch's correspondences with the Latin Vulgate and Septuagint indicate that it represents a more authentic Hebrew text than the Masoretic. Several Protestants replied with a defense of the Masoretic text's authority and argued that the Samaritan text is a late and unreliable derivation from the Masoretic.

The 18th-century Protestant scholar of Hebrew Benjamin Kennicott's analysis of the Samaritan Pentateuch stands as a notable exception to the general trend of early Protestant research on the text. He questioned the underlying assumption that the Masoretic text must be more authentic simply because it has been more widely accepted as the authoritative Hebrew version of the Pentateuch:

We see then that as the evidence of one text destroys the evidence of the other and as there is in fact the authority of versions to oppose to the authority of versions no certain argument or rather no argument at all can be drawn from hence to fix the corruption on either side.

Kennicott also states that the reading Gerizim may actually be the original reading, since that is the mountain for proclaiming blessings, and that it is very green and rich of vegetation (as opposed to Mount Ebal, which is barren and the mountain for proclaiming curses) amongst other arguments.

German scholar Wilhelm Gesenius published a study of the Samaritan Pentateuch in 1815 which biblical scholars widely embraced during the next century. He argued that the Septuagint and the Samaritan Pentateuch share a common source in a family of Hebrew manuscripts which he named the "Alexandrino-Samaritanus". In contrast to the proto-Masoretic "Judean" manuscripts carefully preserved and copied in Jerusalem, he regarded the Alexandrino-Samaritanus as having been carelessly handled by scribal copyists who popularized, simplified, and expanded the text. Gesenius concluded that the Samaritan text contained only four valid variants when compared to the Masoretic text.

In 1915, Paul Kahle published a paper which compared passages from the Samaritan text to Pentateuchal quotations in the New Testament and pseudepigraphal texts including the Book of Jubilees, the First Book of Enoch and the Assumption of Moses. He concluded that the Samaritan Pentateuch preserves "many genuine old readings and an ancient form of the Pentateuch."

Support for Kahle's thesis was bolstered by the discovery of biblical manuscripts among the Dead Sea Scrolls, which contain a text similar to the Samaritan Pentateuch. The Dead Sea Scroll texts have demonstrated that a Pentateuchal text type resembling the Samaritan Pentateuch goes back to the second century BCE and perhaps even earlier.

These discoveries have demonstrated that manuscripts bearing a "pre-Samaritan" text of at least some portions of the Pentateuch such as Exodus and Numbers circulated alongside other manuscripts with a "pre-Masoretic" text. One Dead Sea Scroll copy of the Book of Exodus, conventionally named 4QpaleoExod^{m}, shows a particularly close relation to the Samaritan Pentateuch:

The scroll shares all the major typological features with the SP, including all the major expansions of that tradition where it is extant (twelve), with the single exception of the new tenth commandment inserted in Exodus 20 from Deuteronomy 11 and 27 regarding the altar on Mount Gerizim.

Frank Moore Cross has described the origin of the Samaritan Pentateuch within the context of his local texts hypothesis. He views the Samaritan Pentateuch as having emerged from a manuscript tradition local to the Land of Israel. The Hebrew texts that form the underlying basis for the Septuagint branched out from the Israelite tradition as Israelites emigrated to Egypt and took copies of the Pentateuch with them. Cross states that the Samaritan and the Septuagint share a nearer common ancestor than either does with the Masoretic, which he suggested developed from local texts used by the Babylonian Jewish community. His explanation accounts for the Samaritan and the Septuagint sharing variants not found in the Masoretic and their differences reflecting the period of their independent development as distinct local text traditions. On the basis of archaizing and pseudo-archaic forms, Cross dates the emergence of the Samaritan Pentateuch as a uniquely Samaritan textual tradition to the post-Maccabean age.

== Derivative works ==
=== Translations ===
The Samaritan Targum, composed in the Samaritan variety of Western Aramaic, is the earliest translation of the Samaritan Pentateuch. Its creation was motivated by the same need to translate the Pentateuch into the Aramaic language spoken by the community which led to the creation of Jewish Targums such as Targum Onkelos. Samaritans have traditionally ascribed the Targum to Nathanael, a Samaritan priest who died c. 20 BCE. The Samaritan Targum has a complex textual tradition represented by manuscripts belonging to one of three fundamental text types exhibiting substantial divergences from one another. Affinities that the oldest of these textual traditions share with the Dead Sea Scrolls and Onkelos suggest that the Targum may originate from the same school which finalized the Samaritan Pentateuch itself. Others have placed the origin of the Targum around the beginning of the third century or even later. Extant manuscripts of the Targum are "extremely difficult to use" on account of scribal errors caused by a faulty understanding of Hebrew on the part of the Targum's translators and a faulty understanding of Aramaic on the part of later copyists.

Scholia of Origen's Hexapla and the writings of some Church Fathers contain references to "the Samareitikon" (Ancient Greek: το Σαμαρειτικόν), a work that is no longer extant. Despite earlier suggestions that it was merely a series of Greek scholia translated from the Samaritan Pentateuch, scholars now concur that it was a complete Greek translation of the Samaritan Pentateuch either directly translated from it or via the Samaritan Targum. It may have been composed for the use of a Greek-speaking Samaritan community residing in Egypt.

With the displacement of Samaritan Aramaic by Arabic as the language of the Samaritan community in the centuries following the Muslim conquest of the Levant, they employed several Arabic translations of the Pentateuch. The oldest was an adaptation of Saadia Gaon's mid-900s Tafsir Rasag or Arabic targum of the Masoretic Text. Although the text was modified to suit the Samaritan community, it still retained many unaltered Jewish readings.

By the 11th or 12th century, a new Arabic translation directly based upon the Samaritan Pentateuch had appeared in Nablus. Manuscripts containing this translation are notable for their bilingual or trilingual character; the Arabic text is accompanied by the original Samaritan Hebrew in a parallel column and sometimes the Aramaic text of the Samaritan Targum in a third. Later Arabic translations also appeared; one featured a further Samaritan revision of Saadia Gaon's translation to bring it into greater conformity with the Samaritan Pentateuch and others were based upon Arabic Pentateuchal translations used by Christians.

In April 2013, a complete English translation of the Samaritan Pentateuch comparing it to the Masoretic version was published.

=== Exegetical and liturgical texts ===
Several biblical commentaries and other theological texts based upon the Samaritan Pentateuch have been composed by members of the Samaritan community from the fourth century CE onwards. Samaritans also employ liturgical texts containing catenae extracted from their Pentateuch.

== Manuscripts and printed editions ==
=== Abisha Scroll ===
Samaritans attach special importance to the Abisha Scroll used in the Samaritan synagogue of Nablus. It consists of a continuous length of parchment sewn together from the skins of rams that, according to a Samaritan tradition, were ritually sacrificed. The text is written in gold letters. Rollers tipped with ornamental knobs are attached to both ends of the parchment and the whole is kept in a cylindrical silver case when not in use.

Samaritans claim it was penned by Abishua, great-grandson of Aaron according to 1 Chronicles 6:35, thirteen years after the entry into the Canaan under the leadership of Joshua, son of Nun. Contemporary scholars describe it as a composite of several fragmentary scrolls, each penned between the 12th and 14th centuries.

Other manuscripts of the Samaritan Pentateuch consist of vellum or cotton paper written upon with black ink. Numerous manuscripts of the text exist but none predate the Middle Ages.

The scroll contains a cryptogram, dubbed the tashqil by scholars, which Samaritans consider to be Abishua's ancient colophon:

I am Abishua, the son of Phinehas, the son of Eleazar, the son of Aaron the Priest, unto them be accorded the grace of YHWH and His glory—I wrote this holy book at the entrance of the tabernacle on Mount Gerizim, in the year thirteen of the Israelites' possession of the Land of Canaan according to its boundaries [all] around; I praise YHWH.

=== Western scholarship ===
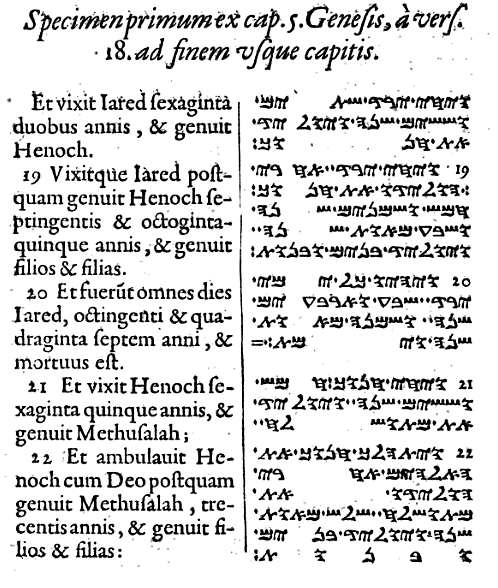
Genesis 5:18-22 as published by Jean Morin in 1631 in the first publication of the Samaritan Pentateuch

Interest in the Samaritan Pentateuch was awakened in 1616 when the traveler Pietro della Valle purchased a copy of the text in Damascus. This manuscript, now known as Codex B, was deposited in a Parisian library. In 1631, an edited copy of Codex B was published in Le Jay's (Paris) Polyglot by Jean Morin. It was republished in Walton's Polyglot in 1657. Subsequently, Archbishop Ussher and others procured additional copies which were brought to Europe and later, America.

=== Modern publications ===
Until the latter half of the 20th century, critical editions of the Samaritan Pentateuch were largely based upon Codex B. The most notable of these is Der Hebräische Pentateuch der Samaritaner (The Hebrew Pentateuch of the Samaritans) compiled by August von Gall and published in 1918. An extensive critical apparatus is included listing variant readings found in previously published manuscripts of the Samaritan Pentateuch. His work is still regarded as being generally accurate despite the presence of some errors, but it neglects important manuscripts including the Abisha Scroll which had not yet been published at the time. Textual variants found in the Abisha scroll were published in 1959 by Federico Pérez Castro and between 1961 and 1965 by A. and R. Sadaqa in Jewish and Samaritan Versions of the Pentateuch – With Particular Stress on the Differences Between Both Texts. In 1976 L.F. Giron-Blanc published Codex Add. 1846, a Samaritan Pentateuch codex dating to 1100 CE in the critical edition Pentateuco Hebreo-Samaritano: Génesis supplemented with variants found in fifteen previously unpublished manuscripts. Certain recently published critical editions of Pentateuchal books take Samaritan variants into account, including D.L. Phillips' edition of Exodus.

The Arabic translation of the Samaritan Pentateuch has been edited and published at the beginning of the 21st century.

There are several publications containing the text of the Samaritan Targum. In 1875, the German scholar Adolf Brüll published his Das samaritanische Targum zum Pentateuch (The Samaritan Targum to the Pentateuch). In 1981, Abraham Tal edited a two-volume set featuring the first critical edition based upon all extant manuscripts containing the Targumic text.

== See also ==
- Samaritan Hebrew

== Bibliography ==
- Tsedaka, Benyamim, and Sharon Sullivan, eds. The Israelite Samaritan Version of the Torah: First English Translation Compared with the Masoretic Version. Wm. B. Eerdmans Publishing, 2013. ISBN 978-0-80286519-9
- Shoulson, Mark E, compiler 2008. The Torah: Jewish and Samaritan versions compared (Hebrew). Evertype. ISBN 1-904808-18-2 / ISBN 978-1-904808-18-3.
- Schorch, Stefan (June 3, 2004). Die Vokale des Gesetzes: Die samaritanische Lesetradition als Textzeugin der Tora (Beihefte zur Zeitschrift für die alttestamentliche Wissenschaft) (German ed., Walter de Gruyter). ISBN 3-11-018101-0 / ISBN 978-3-11-018101-2
- A.C. Hwiid, Specimen ineditae versionis Arabico-Samaritanae, Pentateuchi e codice manuscripto Bibliothecae Barberinae (Rome, 1780).
- A.S. Halkin, “The Scholia to Numbers and Deuteronomy in the Samaritan Arabic Pentateuch,” Jewish Quarterly Review 34 n.s. (1943–44): 41–59.
- T.G.J. Juynboll, “Commentatio de versione Arabico-Samaritana, et de scholiis, quae codicibus Parisiensibus n. 2 et 4 adscripta sunt,” Orientalia 2 (1846), pp. 113–157.
