= Yaqut al-Hamawi =

Arab bibliographer and geographer (1179–1229)

Yaqut ibn-'Abdullah al-Rumi al-Hamawi

Personal life
- Born: 1179 Constantinople, Byzantine Empire
- Died: 1229 (aged 49–50) Aleppo, Ayyubid Sultunate (Abbasid Caliphate)
- Era: Later Abbasid era (12th–13th century)
- Region: Mesopotamia
- Main interest(s): Islamic history, geography, biography
- Notable work: Mu'jam al-Buldan

Religious life
- Religion: Islam

Yāqūt Shihāb al-Dīn ibn-ʿAbdullāh al-Rūmī al-Ḥamawī (1179–1229) (Arabic: ياقوت الحموي الرومي) was a Muslim scholar of Byzantine ancestry active during the late Abbasid period (12th–13th centuries). He is known for his Mu'jam ul-Buldān, an influential work on geography containing valuable information pertaining to biography, history and literature as well as geography.

== Life ==
Yāqūt (ruby or hyacinth) was the kunya of Ibn Abdullāh ("son of Abdullāh"). He was born in Constantinople, the capital of the Byzantine Empire, called in Arabic al-Rūm, whence his nisba "al-Rūmi". Captured in war and enslaved, Yāqūt became "mawali" (Note: The term "mawali" can be translated as client, apprentice or slave.) to ‘Askar ibn Abī Naṣr al-Ḥamawī, a trader of Baghdad, Iraq, the seat of the Abbasid Caliphate, from whom he received the laqab "al-Hamawī". As ‘Askar's apprentice, he learned about accounting and commerce, becoming his envoy on trade missions and travelling twice or three times to Kish in the Persian Gulf. In 1194, ‘Askar stopped his salary over some dispute and Yāqūt found work as copyist to support himself. He embarked on a course of study under the grammarian Al-‘Ukbarî. Five years later he was on another mission to Kish for ‘Askar. On his return to Baghdad he set up as a bookseller and began his writing career.

Yāqūt spent ten years travelling in Iran, Syria, and Egypt and his significance as a scholar lies in his testimony of the great, and largely lost, literary heritage found in libraries east of the Caspian Sea, being one of the last visitors before their destruction by Mongol invaders. He gained much material from the libraries of the ancient cities of Merv – where he had studied for two years – and of Balkh. Circa 1222, he was working on his "Geography" in Mosul and completed the first draft in 1224. In 1227 he was in Alexandria. From there he moved to Aleppo, where he died in 1229.

== Works ==
- Kitāb Mu'jam al-Buldān (Arabic: معجم البلدان) "Dictionary of Countries"; Classified a "literary geography", composed between 1224 and 1228, and completed a year before the author's death. An alphabetical index of place names from the literary corpus of the Arabs, vocalizations, their Arabic or foreign derivation and location. Yaqut supplements geographic descriptions with historical, ethnographic, and associated narrative material with historical sketches and accounts of Muslim conquests, names of governors, monuments, local celebrities etc., and preserves much valuable early literary, historical, biographic and geographic material of prose and poetry. (ed. F. Wüstenfeld, 6 vols., Leipzig, 1866–73, in MENAdoc, vol. 1 A-Ṯ, vol. 2 Ǧ-Z, vol. 3 S-F, vol. 4 Q-Y, vol. 5 Annotations, vol. 6 Index)
- Kitāb Iršād al-arīb ilā maʿrifat al-adīb al-maʿrūf bi-muʿǧam al-udabāʾ wa-ṭabaqāt al-udabāʾ (in MENAdoc), hg. D. S. Margoliouth, Brill, Leyden [u. a.] 1907ff, Vol. 1 : Containing part of the letter Alif, Vol. 2 : Containing the latter part of the letter Alif to the end of the letter Ǧīm, Vol. 3, Part 1 : Containing part of the letter Ḥ, Vol. 4 : Containing the last part of the letter Ḥā to the first part of ʿAin, Vol. 5 : Containing part of the letter ʿAin, Vol. 6 : Containing the last part of the letter ʿAin to the first part of the letter Mīm, Vol. 7 : Containing the last part of the letter Mīm to the end of the work.
- Mu'jam al-Udabā (=Irshād al-Arīb ilā Ma’rifat al-Adīb), (Arabic: معجم الادباء إرشاد الأريب إلى معرفة الأديب) "Literary Encyclopedia, Expert Guide to Literature" (1226); (Ar.) www.archive.org (Ar., Beirut, 1993).
- al-Mushtarak wadh'ā wal-Muftaraq Sa'qā (Arabic: المشترک وضعا والمفترق صقعا); 1846 edition by Ferdinand Wüstenfeld: Jacut's Moschtarik, das ist, Lexicon geographischer Homonyme, Ferdinand Wüstenfeld, 1846; reprinted, 1963, in MENAdoc.

Marâçid; a 6-volume Latin edition by Theodor Juynboll, published as Lexicon geographicum, cui titulus est, Marâsid al ittilâ’ ‘ala asmâ’ al-amkina wa-l-biqâ, in 1852. vol.3, archive.org

- Yaqut ibn 'Abd Allah al-Hamawi (1861). Charles Barbier de Meynard (ed.). Dictionnaire géographique, historique et littéraire de la Perse et des contrées adjacentes, extrait du "Mo'djem el-Bouldan" de Yaquout, et complété à l'aide de documents arabes et persans pour la plupart inédits (in French and Arabic). Paris: Impr. impériale.
  - Alt: Yaqut ibn 'Abd Allah al-Hamawi (1861). Charles Barbier de Meynard (ed.). Dictionnaire géographique, historique et littéraire de la Perse et des contrées adjacentes, extrait du "Mo'djem el-Bouldan" de Yaquout, et complété à l'aide de documents arabes et persans pour la plupart inédits (in French and Arabic). Paris: Impr. impériale.
- Muʿǧam al-buldān [Jacut's Geographisches Wörterbuch]. vol. I–VI. Ed. F. Wüstenfeld, Leipzig 1866–73; 1924. reprint Tehran 1965; Beirut 1955–1957; Frankfurt 1994, ISBN 3-8298-1197-7 (original in Arabic, ISBN 964-435-979-8) (in MENAdoc, vol. 1 A-Ṯ, vol. 2 Ǧ-Z, vol. 3 S-F, vol. 4 Q-Y, vol. 5 Anmerkungen [annotations], vol. 6 Register [index]).
- Lexicon geographicum, cui titulus est, Marâsid al ittilâ’ ‘ala asmâ’ al-amkina wa-l-biqâ’, (مراصد الاطلاع علي اسماء الامكنة والبقاع Observation study of placenames and sites) 6 vols, edited by T.G. Juynboll, 1852[-]64; as Marasid al-ittila’ ‘ala asma’ al-amkina wa-al-biqa’: wa-huwa mukhtasar mu’jam al-buldan li-Yaqut, 3 vols, edited by ‘Ali Muhammad al-Bajjawi, 1992
- Yāqūt Ibn ʻAbdallāh ar-Rūmī; ed. Theodor Juynboll; Lexicon geographicum, cui titulus est مراصد الاطلاع علي اسماء الامكنة والبقاع Introductionem in hunc librum et annotationem in literas أ-ث; Vol.4, p. 729; Leiden, Brill (1859, Arabic-Latin)

== Commentary ==
- Heer, Friedrich Justus (1898). Die historischen und geographischen Quellen in Jāqūt's geographischem Wörterbuch (in Arabic and German). Strassburg: K.J. Trübner.
- Abdullah, Muhammad A.H. (1983). "Yaqut al-Hamawi, the Man and His Work Mu'jam al-buldan" (Thesis). Ypsilanti: Eastern Michigan University.
- ‘Abd al-Karim, Gamal (1974). "La España musulmana en la obra de Yaqut (s. XII[-]XIII)". repertório enciclopédico de ciudades, castillos y lugares de al-Andalus: extraído del Mu’yam al-buldan (diccionario de los países). Granada: University of Granada.
- ‘Abd al-Karim, Gamal (1977), Terminología geográfico-administrativa e historia político-cultural de al-Andalus en el Mu'yam al-buldan de Yaqut (3rd ed.), Seville: University of Seville
- Blachère, Régis (1936) [1913]. "Yaqut al-Rumi, 1153[-]54". In M.T. Houtsma; et al. (eds.). The Encyclopaedia of Islam. Vol. 4 (1st ed.). Leiden: E.J. Brill.
- Barbier de Meynard, Charles (1861), Dictionnaire géographique, historique et littéraire de la Perse et des contrées adjacentes, extrait du Modjem el-Bouldan de Yaqout, et complété à l'aide de documents arabes et persans pour la plupart inédits, Paris: Imprimerie Impériale
- Bloch, Ernst (1929), Harawîs Schrift über die muhammedanischen Wallfahrtsorte, eine der Quellen des Jâqût, Bonn: Verein Studentenwohl
- Dib, al-Sayyid, Muhammad (1988), Yaqut Ali: 'adiban wa-naqidan, Cairo: Dar al-Tiba’ah al-Muhammadiyah
- Elahie, R.M.N.E. (1965), The Life and Works of Yaqut Ali, Lahore: Panjab University Press
- Heer, F. Justus (1898), Die historischen und geographischen Quellen in Jaqut's geographischem Wörterbuch, Strassburg: K.J. Trubner
- The Introductory Chapters of Yaqut's Mu'jam al-Buldan, translated by Jwaideh, Wadie, Leiden: E.J. Brill, 1987 [1959]
- Krachkovskii, I.J. (1957), "Izbrannye sochineniia", Arabskaia Geograficheskaia Literatura, 4, Moscow: Akademiia Nauk SSSR
- Maqbul Ahmad, Seyyed (1980) [1970], ""Yaqut al-Hamawi al-Rumi"", in Coulston Gillispe, Charles (ed.), Dictionary of Scientific Biography, vol. 14: 546[-]48, New York: Scribner
- Marun, Jurj Khalil (1997), Shu'ara' al-amkinah wa-ash'aruhum fi Mu'jam al-buldan, vol. 2, Beirut: al-Maktabah al-’Asriyah
- Rescher, Oskar (1928), Sachindex zu Wüstenfeld's Ausgabe von Jâqût's "Mu'gam el-buldân" (nebst einem alfabetischen Verzeichnis der darin angeführten Werke), Stuttgart: Harrassowitz
- Sa’di, ‘Abbas Fadil (1992), Yaqut al-Hamawi: dirasah fi al-turath al-jughrafi al-'arabi ma'a al-tarkiz 'ala al-'Iraq fi Mu'jam al-buldan, Beirut: Dar al-Tali’ah lil-Tiba’ah wa-al-Nashr
- Sellheim, Rudolf (1966). Voigt, Wolfgang (ed.). "Neue Materialien zur Biographie des Yaqut". Forschungen und Fortschritte der Katalogisierung der Orientalischen Handschriften in Deutschland. Wiesbaden: Steiner: xvi[–]xxxiv.
- Shami, ‘Abd al-Al ‘Abd al-Mu’nim (1981), Mudun Misr wa-quraha 'inda Yaqut al-Hamawi, Kuwait: al-Jam’iyah al-Jughrafiyah al-Kuwaytiyah
- Shamsuddin, Ahmad (1993), Faharis mu'jam al-udaba', aw, Irshad al-arib ila ma'rifat al-adib, Beirut: Dar al-Kutub al-’Ilmiyah
- Tawanisi, Abu al-Futuh Muhammad (1971), Yaqut al-Hamawi: al-jughrafi al-rahhalah al-adib, Cairo: al-Hay’ah al-Misriyah al-’Ammah lil-Ta’lif wa-al-Nashr
- ‘Umari, Muhammad Abu ‘Abd Allah (1994), Ithaf al-khillan bi-ma'arif Mu'jam al-buldan, vol. 2, Riyadh: Dar al-Sumay’i

== See also ==
- Ibn Battuta
- List of slaves
- List of Sunni books
