= Theodor Gaster =

British-born American Biblical scholar (1906–1992)

Theodor Herzl Gaster (July 21, 1906 – February 2, 1992) was a British-born American Biblical scholar known for work on comparative religion, mythology and the history of religion. He is noted for his books, Thespis: Ritual, Myth, and Drama in the Ancient Near East (1950), The Dead Sea Scriptures, about the Dead Sea Scrolls, as well as his one-volume abridgement of Sir James Frazer's massive 13-volume work The Golden Bough, to which Gaster contributed updates, corrections and extensive annotations.

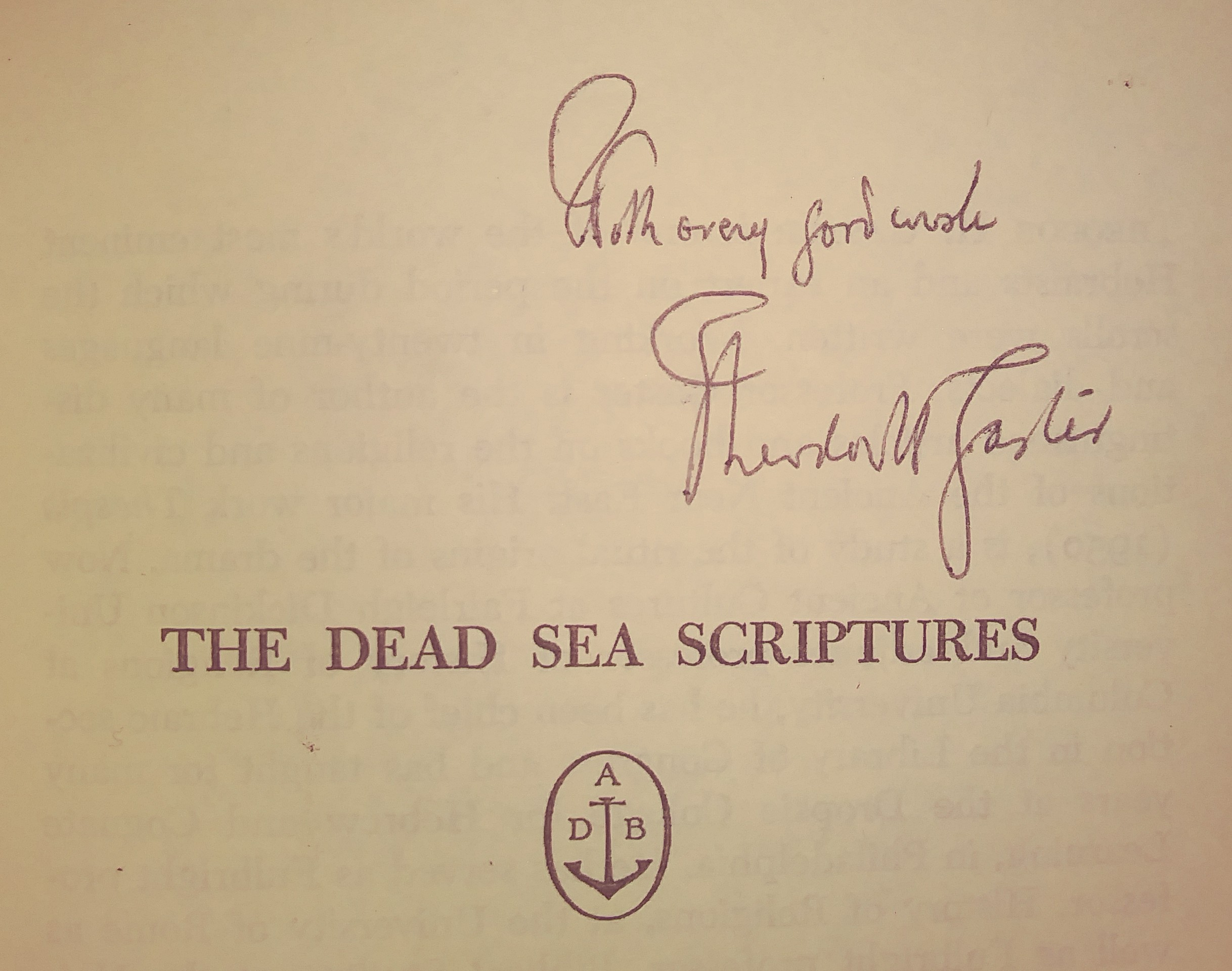
Signed copy of The Dead Sea Scriptures

== Early life and education ==
Gaster was born in London, the son of the folklorist Moses Gaster, then Chief Rabbi of the English Sephardi community, who was Romanian by birth and a well-known linguist and scholar of Judaica. He was also a leading Zionist, and named his son after his friend, Theodor Herzl, who had died in 1904, shortly before the boy's birth. Theodor recalled that the first draft of the Balfour Declaration was prepared in his father's home. His mother was the daughter of Michael Friedländer. Visitors to the Gaster home included Churchill, Lenin, and Freud.

Educated at the University of London, Gaster received an undergraduate degree in classics in 1928 and a master's degree in Near Eastern archaeology in 1936. His master's thesis, a preview of his key work, was titled "The Ras Shamra Texts and the Origins of Drama."

In 1939 or 1940 Gaster moved from London to New York and began work on a PhD at Columbia University. While pursuing his doctorate, he continued to publish.

== Career ==
In 1942 he began teaching part-time in the graduate school at Columbia, and in 1945 he also began teaching part-time at Dropsie College in Philadelphia. From 1946 to 1950 he was a lecturer on Semitic civilization at New York University. From the mid-1940s until the mid-1960s, he was a visiting professor at many colleges and universities in the United States and three times at the University of Leeds.

Gaster's first full-time American post came in 1945, when he served for a year and a half as chief of the Hebraic Section of the Library of Congress in Washington, D.C. In 1951 and 1952, he was a Fulbright Fellow in the history of religions at the University of Rome, and in 1961 he was a Fulbright Fellow in Biblical studies and history of religions at the University of Melbourne.

Most of the books for which Gaster is best known were published in the 1950s, including his translation of the Dead Sea Scrolls, widely admired for its felicitousness; Thespis, his application of the Frazerian myth-and-ritual theory to the ancient Near East and beyond; and his abridgment and updating of Frazer's The Golden Bough (The New Golden Bough [1959]), in which he retained the theory but updated the data. This abridgment was of Frazer's twelve-volume third edition of his opus, which Frazer himself had abridged into one volume in 1922. Gaster's final major work, the two-volume tome Myth, Legend, and Custom in the Old Testament (1969), was similarly an abridgement and updating of Frazer's Folk-lore in the Old Testament. In 1955, he released an album on Folkways Records, The Hebrew Language: Commentary and Readings by Theodor H. Gaster.

Only in 1966, at the age of sixty, did Gaster secure a permanent full-time academic post, as professor of religion at Barnard College, the women's undergraduate division of Columbia University. He helped revamp the curriculum and was Head of the Department of Religion from 1968 to 1972. He continued to lecture widely, and from 1971 to 1981 he was professor of religion and director of ancient Near Eastern studies at Dropsie College, by then renamed Dropsie University.

Upon his retirement from Barnard, he was once again a visiting professor at many American universities. He relocated to Florida to teach for several years at the University of Florida. He moved to Philadelphia in 1988 and died there on February 2, 1992, survived by his wife, Lotta, and daughter, Corinna.

== Legacy ==
Elaine Pagels, who taught for a time at Barnard College, notes in her book Beyond Belief: The Secret Gospel of Thomas (2003), that Gaster, her Barnard colleague, was "the 13th son of the Chief Rabbi of London. He knew all the languages of the Bible, and, at one time in 1976, students in one of his classes heard that he knew 32 languages in all. His teaching was full of warm humanity, humor, challenge, encouragement, and wit."

== Books ==
- A Canaanite Ritual Drama" The Spring Festival at Ugarit. n.p.: n.p. 1946. LCCN 54007278. Reprinted from Journal of the American Oriental Society, volume 66, number 1, Jan.-March, 1946.
- The Face of Hate. New York: Walter J. Black. 1948.
- Passover, its History and Traditions. New York: H. Schuman. 1949. LCCN 49008641.
- Purim and Hanukkah in Custom and Tradition; Feast of Lots, Feast of Lights. New York: Schuman. 1950. LCCN 50010632.
- Thespis: Ritual, Myth, and Drama in the Ancient Near East. New York: Schuman. 1950. LCCN 50006864. Other edition: Thespis: Ritual, Myth, and Drama in the Ancient Near East (new and revised ed.). Garden City, N.Y.: Doubleday. 1961. LCCN 61007650.
- The Oldest Stories in the World. New York: Viking Press. 1952. LCCN 52013711.
- Festivals of the Jewish year: A Modern Interpretation and Guide. New York: Sloane. 1953.
- Holy and the Profane: Evolution of Jewish Folkways. W. Sloane Associates. 1955. LCCN 55007551. (Republished as Customs and Folkways of Jewish Life. New York: W. Sloane Associates. 1955.)
- New Year: its history, customs, and superstitions (1955)
- The Dead Sea Scriptures in English Translation. Garden City, N.Y.: Doubleday. 1956. LCCN 56011602. Other editions: The Dead Sea Scriptures in English Translation (rev. and enl. ed.). Garden City, N.Y.: Anchor Book. 1964. LCCN 64011039. The Dead Sea Scriptures in English (3rd; rev. and enl. ed.). Garden City, N.Y.: Anchor Books/Doubleday. 1976. ISBN 0-385-08859-0.
- Theodore Gaster, ed. (1956). The New Golden Bough: A New Abridgment of the Classic Work by Sir James George Frazer. New American Library/Mentor Book.
- Myth, Legend, and Custom in the Old Testament: A Comparative study with Chapters from Sir James G. Frazer's Folklore in the Old Testament. New York: Harper & Row. 1969. LCCN 69017018.

== Recordings ==
- The Hebrew Language. New York: Folkways Records. 1955.
- Hagadah: Yemenite Passover. Washington, D.C.: Smithsonian Folkways Recordings : Folkways Records. 2001.
