= August von Gall =

German theologian (1872–1946)

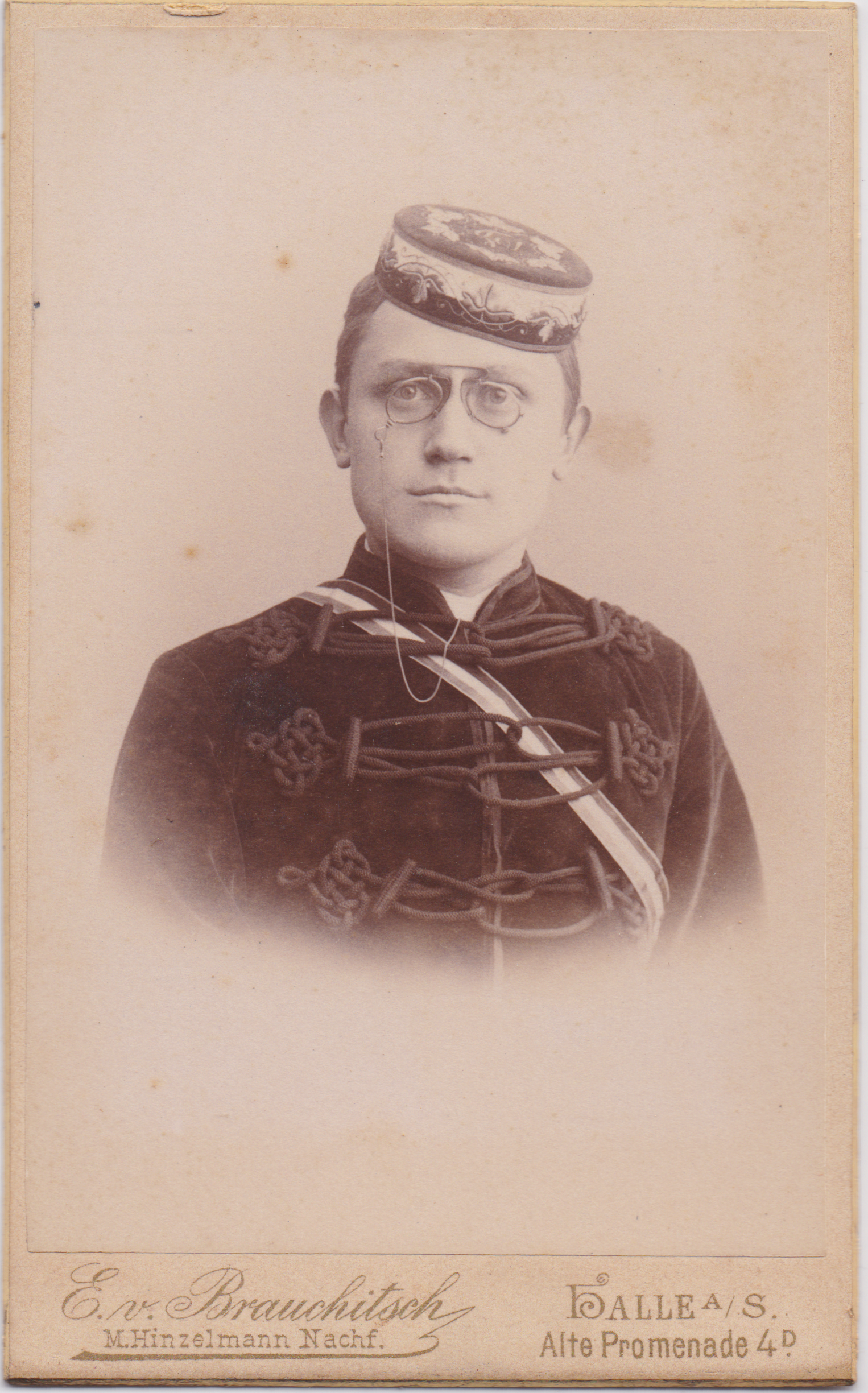
Baron August von Gall as a university student, wearing a distinctive secret organisation hat

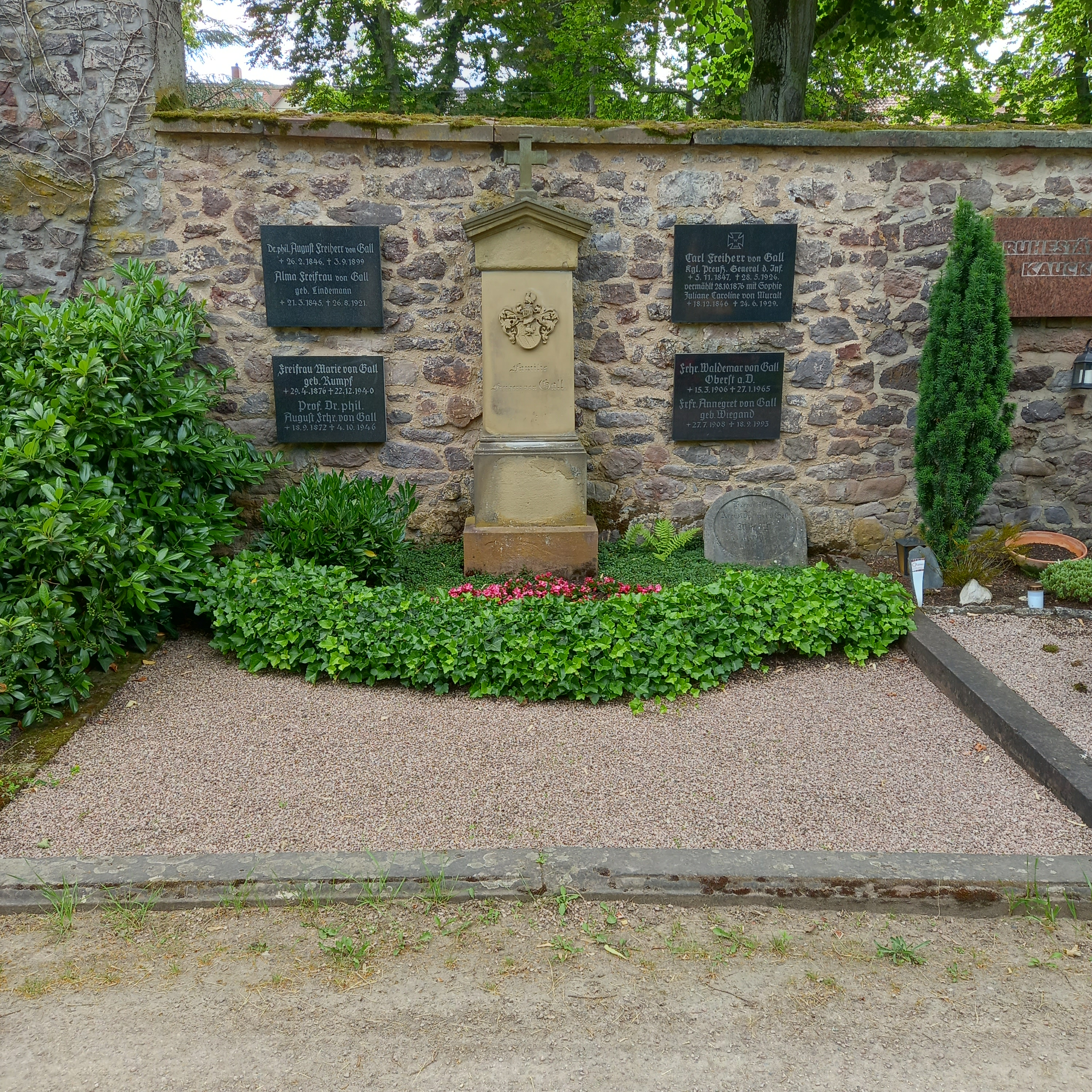
The graves of August von Gall and his wife Marie Rumpf von Gall in the family plot at the Alter Friedhof cemetery in Darmstadt.

August Freiherr von Gall (September 18, 1872 in Lemgo; October 4, 1946 in Scheuern) was a German theologian and orientalist. He was an associate professor of theology at University of Giessen.

== Life ==
August von Gall was a member of the baronial family of the House of von Gall. His parents were August Johann Ludwig Karl Wilhelm von Gall (February 26, 1846—September 3, 1899), the principal of the secondary school in Darmstadt, and his wife Alma Lindemann von Gall (April 29, 1876—December 22, 1940).

After attending high schools in Mainz and Darmstadt, he studied theology and oriental studies at the universities of Halle (now Martin Luther University Halle-Wittenberg) and Giessen. He became a member of the Wingolf fraternities of Halle, Berlin, and Giessen.

In 1897, he initially worked as a minister and religion teacher, and in 1909, he became senior teacher and professor at the Giessen high school.

In 1910, he qualified as a professor at the University of Giessen, where he received an honorary professorship. In 1914, he became an extraordinary professor in Giessen. From 1920, he was a full honorary professor of theology (Old Testament) in Giessen until his retirement in 1937.

August von Gall: Samaritan Pentateuch, 1.

August von Gall worked on depictions of the Kingdom of God in the Old Testament and pre-Christian religions. He became known, however, primarily for his publication of the Samaritan Pentateuch. He used manuscript sources scattered throughout Europe and the Near East as his basis. Later, he studied Aztec culture and published, among other works, an annotated selection of Aztec medical books in German.

== Personal life and family ==
Von Gall married Marie Rumpf, the daughter of a forester, on April 18, 1900, in Ockstadt in Friedberg, Hesse. The couple had two sons:

- Werner (1902–1942), killed in the Battle of Stalingrad; forester, married in 1934 Irmgard Decker (* August 14, 1905)
- Waldemar (1906–1965), retired colonel, married in 1932 Annegret Wiegand (* July 27, 1908)

== Selected works ==
Reprints:

- A. von Gall (ed.): Der hebräische Pentateuch der Samaritaner. Berlin 1966 (photomechanical reprint of the Giessen 1918 edition), reprint: Walter de Gruyter, 1993, ISBN 3-11-009258-1.
- A. von Gall: Medizinische Bücher (tici-amatl) der alten Azteken aus der ersten Zeit der Conquista. VWB-Verlag für Wissenschaft und Bildung, reprint 1997, ISBN 3-927408-11-5.

== Bibliography ==
- Herrmann A. L. Degener: Wer ist’s. Berlin 1935, S. 467.
- Otto Renkhoff: Nassauische Biographie. Kurzbiographien aus 13 Jahrhunderten. 2. Auflage. Historische Kommission für Nassau, Wiesbaden 1992. ISBN 3-922244-90-4, Nr. 1223.
