= Archevite =

Archevite (Aramaic ארכוי) in the Old Testament was one of the nations planted by the Assyrians in Samaria (Ezra 4:9). The Aramaic expression is also sometimes translated as people . . . from Uruk, people of Erech, Erechites, and so on.

Sir Isaac Newton wrote in The Chronology of Ancient Kingdoms that he believed Archevite was located in "the south and south-east side of Assyrian Empire" and were "transplanted by Esarhaddon to Samaria".

Jonathan Edwards thought that the Archevites referred to the men of Erech, which is thought to be modern day Uruk, removed from there and brought to Samaria.
