= Elam, son of Shem =

Biblical character

Elam (/ˈiːləm/; עֵילָם ‘Elam) in the Hebrew Bible (Genesis 10:22, Ezra 4:9) is said to be one of the sons of Shem, the son of Noah. The name is also used (as in Akkadian) for the ancient country of Elam in what is now southwestern Iran, whose people the Hebrews believed to be the offspring of Elam, son of Shem (Genesis 10:22). This implies that the Elamites were considered Semites by the Hebrews. Their language was not one of the Semitic languages, but is considered a linguistic isolate. Additionally, modern-day Persians are believed in some traditions to be descendants of Elam, and therefore descendants of Shem in biblical tradition.

Elam (the nation) is also mentioned in Genesis 14, describing an ancient war in the time of Abraham, involving Chedorlaomer, the king of Elam at that time.

The prophecies of the Book of Isaiah (11:11, 21:2, 22:6) and the Book of Jeremiah (25:25) also mention Elam. The last part of Jeremiah 49 is an apocalyptic oracle against Elam which states that Elam will be scattered to the four winds of the earth, but "will be, in the end of days, that I will return their captivity," a prophecy self-dated to the first year of Zedekiah (597 BC). The Book of Ezekiel (32:24-25) also mentions "Elam" as a location in an apocalyptic narrative that it would be, "...all of them slain, fallen by the sword...caused their terror in the land of the living; yet have they borne their shame with them that go down to the pit..." (KJV)

The Book of Jubilees may reflect ancient tradition when it mentions a son (or daughter, in some versions) of Elam named "Susan", whose daughter Rasuaya married Arpachshad, progenitor of another branch of Shemites. Shushan (or Susa) was the ancient capital of the Elamite Empire. (Dan. 8:2)

Elam as a personal name also refers to other figures appearing in the Hebrew Bible:

- Elam is a son of Shashak of the tribe of Benjamin in 1 Chronicles 8:24 .
- Elam is the son of Meshelemiah, a Levite of the family of Kohath in 1 Chronicles 26:3.
- Elam is the ancestor of a family that returned with Zerubbabel in Ezra 2:1-2,7.
- Elam is the ancestor of a family that returned from the Captivity in Ezra 2:31. This is possibly the same man and family as in Ezra 2:1-2,7.
- Elam is the ancestor of a family that returned with Ezra in Ezra 8:7 .
- Elam is the father of Jehiel and the grandfather of Shecaniah in Ezra 10:2.
- Elam is one of the men who joins Nehemiah in sealing the new covenant in Nehemiah 10:14.
- Elam is a priest who helps in the rededication of the rebuilt walls of Jerusalem in Nehemiah 12:42.

== See also ==
- List of biblical names starting with E
- Archevite - A nation mentioned along with Elam in Ezra 4:9
