= Moses Gaster =

Romanian-British scholar

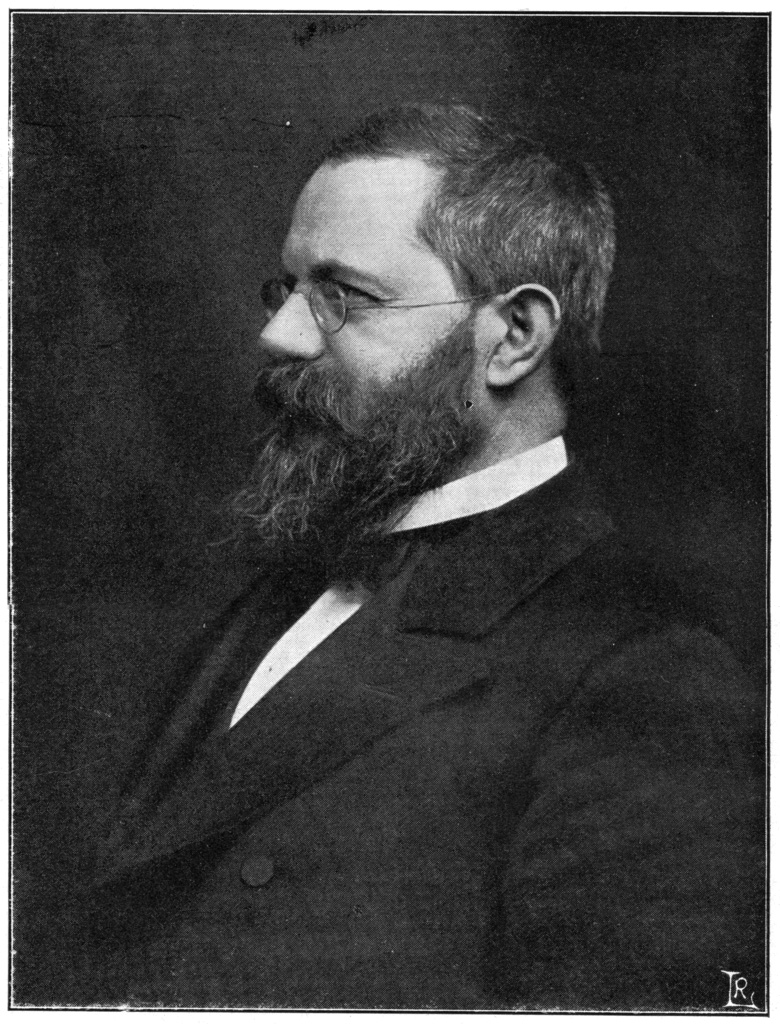
- Moses Gaster in 1904
- Born: 17 September 1856; Bucharest, Wallachia
- Died: 5 March 1939 (aged 82); Abingdon, Berkshire, England
- Citizenship: Austrian and Romanian (after 1881); British, after 1893
- Education: University of Leipzig, Jewish Theological Seminary of Breslau
- Employer(s): University of Oxford; University of Bucharest
- Title: hakham of the Spanish and Portuguese congregation, London
- Spouse: Lucy Gaster (nee Friedlander)
- Children: Jack Gaster, Theodor Gaster

Moses Gaster (17 September 1856 – 5 March 1939) was a Romanian, later British scholar, the Hakham of the Spanish and Portuguese Jewish congregation, London, and a Hebrew and Romanian linguist. Moses Gaster was an active Zionist in Romania as well as in England, where in 1899 he helped establish the English Zionist Federation.

== Biography ==
=== Life in Romania ===
Gaster was born in Bucharest into a renowned Jewish Austrian family which had settled in Wallachia at the beginning of the 19th century. He was the eldest son of Chevalier Abraham Emanuel Gaster, who was the consul of the Netherlands in Bucharest and the grandson of Asriel Gaster, a prosperous merchant and community leader. His mother, Pnina Judith Rubinstein, came from a rabbinical dynasty which included Rabbi Levi Isaac ben Meir.

After having taken a degree in his native city (1874), he proceeded to Leipzig, where he received the degree of PhD in 1878 and then to the Jewish Seminary in Breslau, where he gained the Hattarat Hora'ah (rabbinical diploma) in 1881. His history of Romanian popular literature was published in Bucharest in 1883.

He was lecturer on the Romanian language and literature at the University of Bucharest (1881–85), inspector-general of schools, and a member of the council for examining teachers in Romania. He also lectured on the Romanian apocrypha, the whole of which he had discovered in manuscript.

Gaster was a central figure of Hibbat Zion in Romania and played a central role in the 1882 establishment by Jews from Moinești of the Samarin (Zamarin) settlement, known since 1884 as Zichron Ya'akov.

=== Life in England ===
Having been expelled from Romania by the Ion Brătianu government in 1885 for allegedly "being a member of an irredentist society", he went to England, where he held a lectureship, 1886 and 1891, in Slavonic literature at the University of Oxford, his lectures being later published as Greco-Slavonic Literature, London, 1886.

A few years after, the Romanian government cancelled the decree of expulsion, presented him with the Romanian Ordinul Naţional "Pentru Merit" of the first class (1891), and invited him to return; however, he declined the invitation, and in 1893 became a naturalised British citizen. In 1895, at the request of the Romanian government, he wrote a report on the British system of education, which was printed as a "green book" and accepted as a basis of education in Romania.

In 1887 Gaster was appointed hakham of the Spanish and Portuguese Congregation in London, in which capacity he presided over the bicentenary of Bevis Marks Synagogue. He was invited to give the Ilchester Lectures at Oxford which were published in 1887 as Ilchester Lectures on Greeko-Slavonic literature. Appointed as principal of Judith Lady Montefiore College, Ramsgate, from 1891 to 1896, he wrote valuable collection of essays accompanying the yearly reports of that institution. He was a member of the councils of the Folklore, Biblical, Archaeological, and Royal Asiatic societies, writing many papers in their interest. He was the only ordained rabbi ever to become president of The Folklore Society, in 1907–1908.

In 1925, Gaster was appointed one of the six members of the honorary board of trustees (Curatorium) of the Yiddish Scientific Institute (YIVO) in Vilnius alongside Simon Dubnow, Albert Einstein, Sigmund Freud, Edward Sapir and Chaim Zhitlowsky.

=== Visiting the Holy Land & Zionism ===
Gaster made a special study of the Samaritans and became a recognised authority on their language and literature. He visited Nablus in the Ottoman Beirut Vilayet, the headquarters of the Samaritan community, and induced them to part with manuscripts covering the whole range of their literature. Where he could not secure the originals he had copies made for him by Samaritan priests. Gaster was among the most active leaders of the Zionist movement in England, and even while in Romania he assisted in establishing the first Jewish colony in Palestine, Zichron Ya'akov.

Rising in worldwide Jewish affairs he became vice-president of the First Zionist Congress in Basel, and was a prominent figure in each succeeding congress. Gaster's residence, "Mizpah" 193 Maida Vale in London served as the venue for early talks between prominent Zionists and the Foreign Office in 1917. The first draft of the Balfour Declaration was written at the Gaster home on 7 February 1917 in the presence of Chaim Weizmann, Nahum Sokolow, Baron Rothschild, Sir Mark Sykes and Herbert Samuel. Other visitors to the Gaster home included Winston Churchill, Vladimir Lenin, and Sigmund Freud.

=== Collector of manuscripts ===
Gaster was a great collector of manuscripts, having over two thousand, mainly Hebrew, Samaritan and Slavonic. At the outbreak of the Second World War his collection was moved for safekeeping to cellars in the centre of London. However, water used to quench London fires saturated a large part of the collection, which made some of the items illegible in whole or in part. Fortunately many of them had previously been transliterated into Hebrew typescript.

The collection comprised over 10,000 fragments in Hebrew and Judaeo-Arabic from the Cairo Geniza (the genizah of the Ben Ezra Synagogue in Old Cairo); some 350 Hebrew codices and scrolls including prayer-books of many Jewish communities, apocryphal writings, commentaries, treatises, letters, marriage contracts, piyyutim, and thirteen scrolls of the Law; some 350 Samaritan manuscripts, among them manuscripts of the Pentateuch, commentaries and treatises, and liturgical, historical, chronological and astronomical codices, detailed census lists of the Samaritans and lists of manuscripts in their possession; and almost 1,500 uncatalogued Arabic fragments on paper from the Synagogue of Ben Ezra.

== Collections ==
In 1954 Gaster's manuscript collection was purchased by the John Rylands Library (since 1972 part of the University of Manchester), where it remains. The Rylands Cairo Genizah Project has been in progress for a number of years on the identification of fragments and digitisation of images of the texts.

The 'Gaster Collection,' a number of mainly Karaite and Yemenite manuscripts were purchased from the library of Dr. Moses Gaster in 1927, and are currently housed at the British Library. An important early Hebrew codex called the First Gaster Bible was also acquired by the British Library from his collection.

In 1974 Gaster's archive was given to University College London. The collection spans around 300 boxes and includes working papers from his posts on a variety of subjects including Jewish history, Zionism, Romanian Jewry and Anglo-Jewry. The collection also includes extensive correspondence from Jewish and Zionist organisations, from newspapers, periodicals and publishers, and from a large number of individuals outside Gaster's family. The collection has been partially digitised through UCL's Digital Collections.

== Personal life ==
Moses Gaster was the father of Jack and Theodor Gaster and the grandfather of Marghanita Laski. He was also son-in-law to Michael Friedländer and father-in-law to Neville Laski.

== Literary works ==
Gaster's major work, in which he invested ten years of his life, was a Romanian chrestomathy and glossary covering the period from the dawn of Romanian literature down to 1830. Gaster also wrote various text-books for the Jewish community of Romania, made a Romanian translation of the Siddur, and compiled a short Hebrew Bible history.

Gaster believed in a scientific study of folklore and did not sympathize with those believing that preserving folklore should mostly serve a political nationalist purpose. His study of Romanian folklore led Gaster to conclusions at odds with those shared by most scholars of his time, who found there traces of pre-Christian beliefs. Gaster argued that nothing found in Romanian folklore pre-dated Christianity, and that what appeared as pre-Christian to other scholars in fact derived from a Christian heresy, Bogomilism.

A list of major works follows:

- Literatura populară română (1883)
- Jewish Folk-Lore in the Middle Ages (1887);
- Ilchester Lectures on Greeko-Slavonic literature (1887);
- Chrestomatie Română (2 volumes, 1891)
- The Sword of Moses from an ancient manuscript book of magic, with introduction, translation, and index (1896);
- The Chronicles of Jerahmeel (1899) copy at Google Books;
- Hebrew Illuminated Bibles of the Ninth and Tenth Centuries and a Samaritan Scroll of the Pentateuch (1901);
- History of the Ancient Synagogue of the Spanish and Portuguese Jews, a memorial volume in celebration of the two-hundredth anniversary of its inauguration (1901).
- edited The Book of Prayer and Order of Service according to the custom of the Spanish and Portuguese Jews (6 volumes, 1901–1907);
- The Hebrew Version of the Secretum Secretorum (1907–1908);
- Das Buch Josua (1908), on the Samaritan Book of Joshua;
- Rumanian Bird and Beast Stories (1915);
- Children's Stories from Roumanian Legends and Fairy Tales [1923];
- The Exempla of the Rabbis (1924);
- Studies and Texts in Folklore, Magic, Medieval Romance, Hebrew Apocrypha and Samaritan Archaeology, 3 Vols. (1925–28)
- The Samaritans: Their History, Doctrines and Literature. (The Schweich Lectures for 1923) (1925);
- The Asatir: The Samaritan Book of the “Secrets of Moses” (1927);
- The Story of Chanucah (1928);
- The Titled Bible: a Model Codex of the Pentateuch Reproduced in Facsimile from MS. No. 85 of the Gaster Collection (1929);
- Die 613 Gebote und Verbote der Samaritaner, in "Festschrift zum Bestehen des jüd.-theol. Seminars Breslau", (1929);
- The Story of Passover (1929);
- The Story of Purim (1929);
- The Story of Shavuoth (1930);
- The Story of the High Festivals and the Feast of Tabernacles (1931);
- Conjurations and the Ancient Mysteries (1932);
- Samaritan Oral Law and Ancient Traditions, Vol. I, Eschatology (1932);
- Ma'aseh Book: Book of Jewish Tales and Legends Translated from the Judeo-German (in two volumes); Philadelphia, The Jewish Publication Society of America (1934).

Contributions to periodical literature:

- "Beiträge zur Vergleichenden Sagen und Märchenkunde", in Monatsschrift, xxix. 35 et seq.;
- "Ein Targum der Amidah," in ib. xxxix. 79 et seq.;
- "The Legend of the Grail." Folk-Lore. Vol. 2. 1891
- "The Apocalypse of Abraham from the Roman Text", in the Transactions of the Royal Asiatic Society, ix. 195;
- "The Unknown Hebrew Versions of the Tobit Legend," in ib. 1897, p. 27;
- "The Oldest Version of Midrash Meghillah", in Kohut Memorial Volume;
- "Hebrew Text of One of the Testaments of the Twelve Patriarchs", in the Proceedings of the Society of Biblical Archæology, xvi. 33 et seq.;
- "Contributions to the History of Aḥiḳar and Nadam", in the Transactions of the Royal Asiatic Society, 1900, p. 301.
- "The Present Position of the Jews in Relation to World Events", in the Journal of the Transactions of the Victoria Institute Vol. 68 (1936), pp. 146-172 (PDF)

== Biographies of Gaster ==
- Elisabeta Mănescu, Dr. M. Gaster, viaţa şi opera sa, 1940, Editura Rotativa, Bucharest
- Moses Gaster, Memorii, corespondenţă, 1998, Editura Hasefer, Bucharest, ISBN 973-9235-47-6
