= Chronicles of Jerahmeel =

The Chronicles of Jerahmeel is a Hebrew collection of Jewish history texts covering a period of time between the creation of the earth and the death of Judas Maccabeus in 160 BCE. The primary author Jerahmeel or Yeraḥme’el ben Solomon is believed to have lived in 12th century in Southern Italy. It is a composite text or an anthology that contains in part the historiographical Yosippon. A later compiler Eleazar ben Asher ha-Levi assembled it around 1325.

== Description ==
This voluminous work draws largely on Pseudo-Philo's earlier history of Biblical events and is of special interest because it includes Hebrew and Aramaic versions of certain deuterocanonical books in the Septuagint.

The book was compiled in Germany in the 1300s. The Chronicles were published in English as The Chronicles of Jerahmeel Or, the Hebrew Bible Historiale by the Royal Asiatic Society, translated by Moses Gaster, 1899. Gaster stated in his extensive preface his view (p. xx) that the Chronicles were compiled from several Hebrew sources, some quite ancient and others more recent. Gaster only published the first part of the work and dated it to the 6th century, though the text itself claims it is the combined work of the 11th-12th century and the 14th century.

The actual compiler of the chronicles identifies himself as "Eleasar ben Asher the Levite" who, according to Gaster, lived in the Rhineland in the 14th century. The most recent events depicted in the Chronicles refer to the time of the Crusades, but the entire rest of it pertains to the period before 70 CE. Among the early sources quoted in the work is the 1st century Rabbi Eliezer ben Hyrcanus.

Gaster explained that he chose to title it "Chronicles of Jerahmeel" instead of "Chronicles of Eleasar" because of his analysis that Eleasar was merely a compiler, while Jeraḥmeel is the source most extensively reproduced, following the Yosippon which is otherwise extant.

At least one fragment of the work is found in the Cairo Geniza.
