= Theodor Juynboll =

Dutch theologian

Juynboll, Theodor Willem Johannes
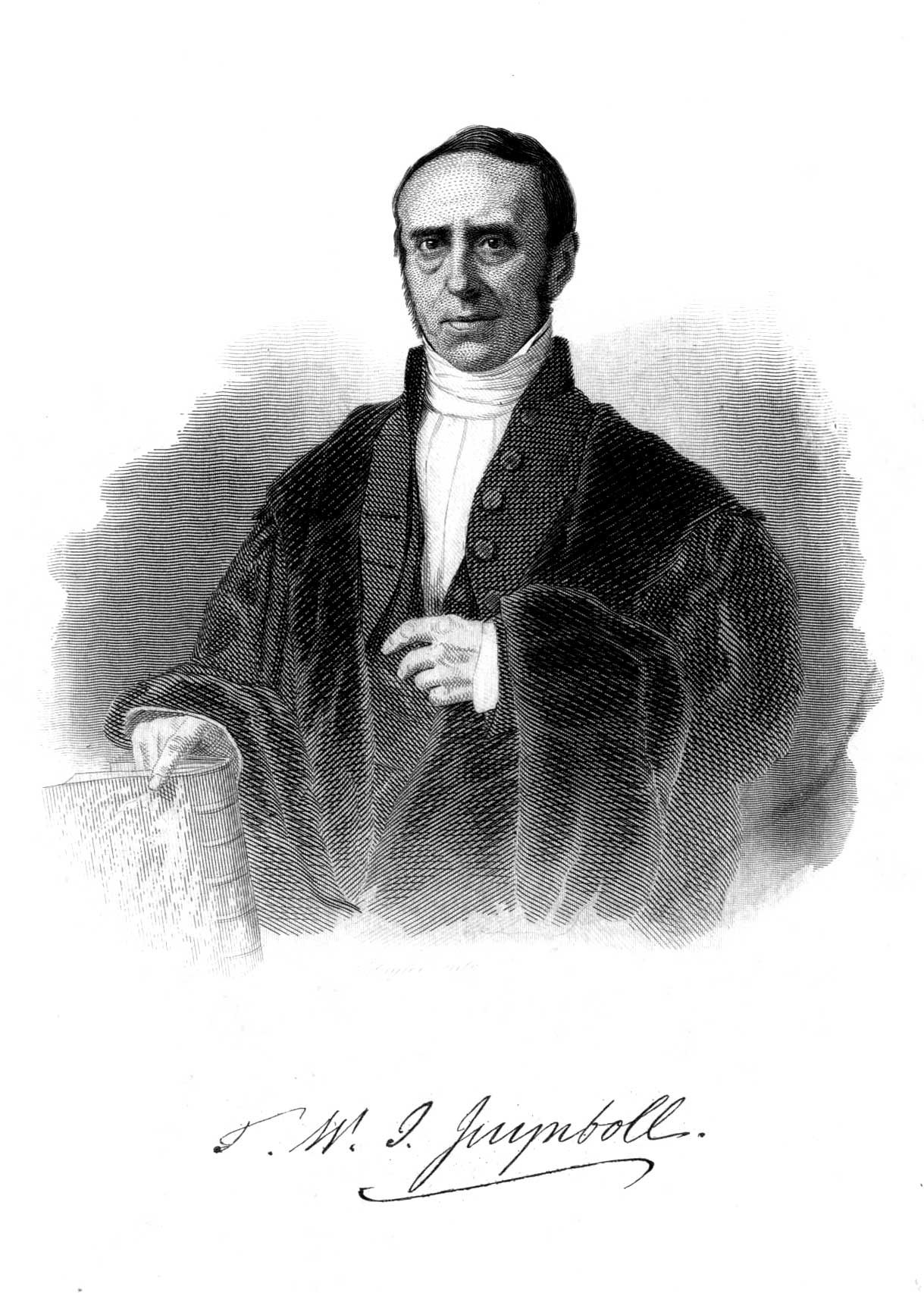
- Theodoor Willem Johannes Juynboll
- Born: April 6, 1802; Rotterdam, Netherlands
- Died: September 16, 1861; Leiden, Netherlands
- Education: University of Leiden
- Occupations: Dutch reformed theologian and oriental philologist
- Spouse: Wilhelmina Eva Verkouteren (1802–1871)
- Children: Abraham Wilhelm Theodorus Juynboll (1833–1887)
- Parent(s): Gualterus Johannes Juynboll and Catharina Johanna Pla.

Theodor Willem Johannes Juynboll, also Theodorus Willem Johannes Juijnboll, Theodorus Guiliemus Johannes Juynboll (April 6, 1802 in Rotterdam – September 16, 1861 in Leiden) was a Dutch Reformed theologian and oriental philologist.

== Life ==
Theodor Juynboll was the son of Gualterus Johannes Juynboll and Catharina Johanna Pla. After his mother died early in his childhood, his father married Johanna Deel and the family moved to The Hague where Theodor attended Latin school. In 1821 he enrolled in theology and Semitic languages at the University of Leiden under Hendrik Arent Hamaker (1789–1835) and Johannes Hendricus van der Palm. He was awarded an honorary mention in the academic competition of the University of Leuven in 1824. (Note: Commentatio de causis, quare regnum Judae diutius perstiterit quam regnum Israël(Leuven, 1824)) In 1828 he earned his doctorate of theology. (Note: Treatise Disputatio de Amoso ejusque scriptis ac veteribus eorum interpretibus, pars prima)

In 1828, he entered the parish ministry of Voorhout, where he worked as a pastor until 1831 when he succeeded Groenewoud as professor of semitic languages at the Athenaeum in Franeker. He taught Hebrew and Semitic languages and Jewish antiquities and later the Old Testament and Arab writers. He held the Alternate Rectorate of the Educational Institution from 1834 to 1836. In 1840 he became a corresponding member of the Royal Institute of the Netherlands. In the same year he received a royal honor as a professor of Oriental languages and Hebrew history at the University of Groningen.

Juynboll succeeded G. Wolters at the University of Groningen in 1841 and four years later H. E. Weijers in Leiden. As adjudicator he had R. Dozy (1846–1850) and later Pieter de Jong (1859–1861) and de Goeje. In 1845, he received an honorary doctorate of philosophy from the Senate of Groningen University, a professorship at the Faculty of Philosophy, Leiden University, teaching Oriental languages such as Arabic, Syriac, and Hebrew. In 1853/54, he became rector of his Alma Mater.

Juynboll was a friend and colleague of the orientalist Ferdinand Wüstenfeld. When Juynboll died prematurely, Wüstenfeld continued his translation work of the great geographic encyclopedia, Mu'jam al-Buldan by Yaqut al-Hamawi, on which Juynboll had been editing an abridgement titled, Marâsid al ittilâ.

In 1829, Juynboll married Wilhelmina Eva Verkouteren (1802–1871) at Voorhout. Their son Abraham Wilhelm Theodorus Juynboll (1834–1887) also gained renown as a philologist.

== Orations ==
- Oratio de hodierna studii linguarum orientalium conditione (Franeker 1832)
- Oratio de Henrico Arentio Hamakero, studii literarum oo in patria nostra vindice praeclaro, Dicta publice The XXI septembris A. MDCCCXXXVI, Quum athenaei, quod Franequerae est, regundi munus solenni ritu deponeret (1837)
- Oratio de gente Sammaritano (1841)
- Oratio de praecipuis progressibus, quos literae semiticae hoc ipso decennio fecerunt (1845)
- Oratio de Codicum Orientalium, quae in Academia Lugduno-Batava servantur Bibliotheca (1853–54)

== Works ==
Much of Juynboll's works deal with the history and literature of the Samaritans:

- Commentatio ad quaestionem ab Ordine Philosophorum et Literatorum propositam: Exponantur causae quibus effectum sit, ut regnum Iudae diutius persisteret quam regnum Israel (Leuven, 1824)
- Disputatio de Amoso ejusque scriptis ac veteribus eorum interpretibus, pars prima (Leiden, 1828)
- Letterkundige Bijdragen (3rd part; Leiden, 1838)
- Sermo de Henrico Engelino Weyers (Groningen, 1844)
- Commentatio de versione Arabico-Samaritana, et de scholiis, quae codicibus Parisiensibus n. 2 et 4 adscripta sunt (Orientalia II, 113 acc.; Amsterdam, 1846)
- Commentarii in historiam gentis Samaritanae (Leiden, 1846)
- Chronicon samaritanum arabice conscriptum cui titulus est Liber Josuae (Leiden, 1848)

== Edited Texts ==
- Lexicon geographicum, cui titulus est, Marâsid al ittilâ’ ‘ala asmâ’ al-amkina wa-l-biqâ (6 vols, 1852[-]64) (Note: Marasid al-ittila’ ‘ala asma’ al-amkina wa-al-biqa’: wa-huwa mukhtasar mu’jam al-buldan li-Yaqut, 3 vols, edited by ‘Ali Muhammad al-Bajjawi, 1992; Cf. Jaqut's shortened geographic dictionary: "Maracid alittila"(or "Meracid alittila") M. C. Defremery; "Memoires D'Histoire Orientale",1862, p.219. (Meracid alittila, Juynboll, ed. p.347))
- Kitab al-Buldan of Yaqubi, Ahmad ibn Abi Yaqub (d. 897?)
- Jaqubi's Kitab al-boldan als: Specimen... exhibens Kitabo'l-Boldan (Lugd. Bat., 1861)
- Lexicon geographicum
- Ibn Taghribirdi's Annals, (unfinished). 4 parts of the first work (Leiden, 1850–1864, 1 part Arabic text, in collaboration with J.J.B. Gaal, 3 parts introduction and notes, 2 of which were posthumous). Two parts of the latter have been published, partly in collaboration with B.F. Matthes (Leiden, 1851–1861)
- Abü'l-Mahäsin ibn Tagri Bardii Annales (Leiden, 1857)
- Licht gezonden van het Mohammedaansch rechtsboek At-Tanbih auctor Abu Ishak As-Shirazi (Leiden, 1879) (Note: Critique of the Islamic legal text Kitāb al-Tanbīh by the 11th C. jurist Abu Ishaq as-Shirazi)
- al-Tanbīh fī al-fiqh ʻalá madhhab al-Imām al-Shāfiʻī (التنبيه في الفقه على مذهب الإمام الشافعي), "Exhortation on fiqh in the doctrine of Imam Shafi'i" by Abū Isḥāq Ibrāhīm ibn ʻAlī ibn Yūsuf Fīrūzābādī al-Shīrāzī (فيروزآبادي الشيرازي، أبو إسحاق إبراهيم بن علي بن يوسف) (Arabic text; Lugd. Bat., 1879)
