= Lud, son of Shem =

Biblical character

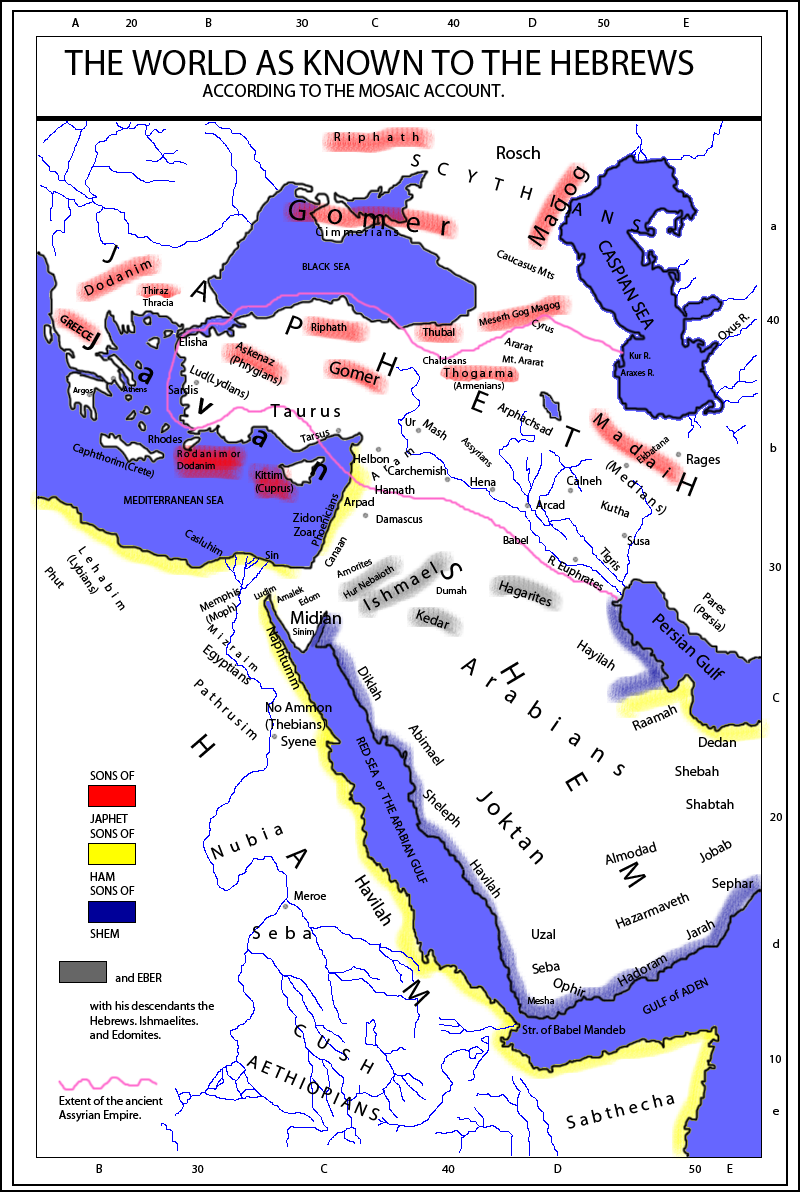
A map of the Generations of Noah placing the "Lud" in Lydia, following Josephus.

Lud (Hebrew: לוּד Lūḏ) was a son of Shem and grandson of Noah, according to Genesis 10 (the "Table of Nations").

The descendants of Lud are usually, following Josephus, connected with various Anatolian peoples, particularly Lydia (Assyrian Luddu) and their predecessors, the Luwians; cf. Herodotus' assertion (Histories i. 7) that the Lydians were first so named after their king, Lydus (Λυδός). However, the chronicle of Hippolytus of Rome (c. 234 AD) identifies Lud's descendants with the Lazones or Alazonii (names usually taken as variants of the "Halizones" said by Strabo to have once lived along the Halys) while it derives the Lydians from the aforementioned Ludim, son of Mizraim.

The Book of Jubilees, in describing how the world was divided between Noah's sons and grandsons, says that Lud received "the mountains of Asshur and all appertaining to them till it reaches the Great Sea, and till it reaches the east of Asshur his brother" (Charles translation). The Ethiopian version reads, more clearly "... until it reaches, toward the east, toward his brother Asshur's portion." Jubilees also says that Japheth's son Javan received islands in front of Lud's portion, and that Tubal received three large peninsulae, beginning with the first peninsula nearest Lud's portion. In all these cases, "Lud's portion" seems to refer to the entire Anatolian peninsula, west of Mesopotamia.

Some scholars have associated the Biblical Lud with the Lubdu of Assyrian sources, who inhabited certain parts of western Media and Atropatene.

10th century Muslim historian Ali ibn al-Husayn al-Masudi writes in his widely acclaimed historical book The Meadows of Gold and Mines of Gems that Keyumars, the first king of Persia, was the son of Lud, son of Shem.

The Muslim historian Muhammad ibn Jarir al-Tabari (c. 915) recounts a tradition that the wife of Lud was named Shakbah, daughter of Japheth, and that with him she gave birth to "Faris, Jurjan, and the races of Persia." He further asserts that Lud was the progenitor of not only the Persians, but also the Amalekites and Canaanites, and all the peoples of the East, Oman, Hejaz, Syria, Egypt, and Bahrain.

Some creationists identify Lud as the progenitor of Haplogroup I-M170.

== See also ==
- Generations of Noah
