= List of Celtic deities =

List of deities of the Celtic peoples

The Celtic deities are known from a variety of sources such as written Celtic mythology, ancient places of worship, statues, engravings, religious objects, as well as place and personal names.

Celtic deities can belong to two categories: general and local. General deities were known by the Celts throughout large regions, and are the gods and goddesses called upon for protection, healing, luck, and honour. The local deities from Celtic nature worship were the spirits of a particular feature of the landscape, such as mountains, trees, or rivers, and thus were generally only known by the locals in the surrounding areas.

After Celtic lands became Christianised, there were attempts by Christian writers to euhemerize most of the pre-Christian deities. Some scholars have suggested that a few others, such as Brigit, may have become Saints in the Church. The Tuatha Dé Danann of Irish mythology, who were commonly interpreted as divinities or deified ancestors, were downgraded in Christian writing to fallen or ‘half-fallen’ angels, historical men, or demons; the latter has been the most common Christian view on most pagan deities. In many cases, traditions or practices, such as the reverence of holy wells, which often became baptismals, and most of which predate the coming of Christianity, that were considered redeemable were co-opted or reinterpreted as Christian.

== Ancient Gallic deities ==
The Gauls inhabited the region corresponding to modern-day France, Belgium, Switzerland, southern and western Germany, Luxembourg and northern Italy. They spoke Gallic. The Celtic Britons inhabited most of the island of Great Britain and spoke Common Brittonic or British.

=== Female ===
- Abnoba - Gaulish goddess worshipped in the Black Forest
- Acionna - Gaulish goddess of the river Essonne
- Adsagsona - Gallic goddess of magic named on the Larzac tablet
- Adsullata - goddess of the River Sava
- Agronā - hypothetical Brittonic goddess of the River Ayr
- Alantedoba - a goddess in Val Camonica
- Ancamna - Gallic goddess in the Moselle Valley
- Ancasta - Brittonic goddess of Clausentum
- Andarta - Gallic goddess
- Andrasta - Brittonic goddess of victory
- Annea Clivana - Gallic goddess of the Cenomani
- Apadeva - a water goddess
- Arduinna - Gallic goddess of the Ardennes Forest
- Arnemetia - Brittonic goddess of nemetons
- Artio - Gallic goddess of the bear
- Axona - Gallic goddess of the river Aisne
- Beira - see Cailleach
- Belisama - Gallic and Brittonic goddess
- Bergusia - Gallic goddess of Alesia, companion of Ucuetis
- Bormana - Gallic goddess of mineral springs, companion of Bormanos
- Bricta (Brixta) - Gallic goddess of Luxeuil mineral springs, companion of Luxovios
- Brigantia - Brittonic goddess of the Brigantes
- Cailleach - goddess of landscape and weather, particularly important in Scotland; also known as Beira
- Carpundia - a river goddess
- Carvonia - a goddess in Noricum
- Cathubodua - Gallic war goddess
- Caticatona - Gallic water goddess in Rauranum
- Cissonia - Gallic goddess of trade, companion of Cissonius
- Clota - hypothetical Brittonic goddess of the River Clyde
- Coventina - Brittonic goddess of wells and springs
- Damona - Gallic goddess of mineral springs, consort of Apollo Borvo and of Apollo Moritasgus
- Dea Latis - Brittonic goddess of bogs and pools, companion of Deus Latis
- Dea Matrona - "divine mother goddess" and goddess of the River Marne in Gaul
- Divona - Gallic goddess of sacred springs and rivers
- Epona - fertility goddess, protector of horses
- Erecura - goddess of death and fertility
- Hafren - Brittonic goddess of the River Severn, also known as Sabrina
- Icauna - Gallic goddess of the river Yonne
- Icovellauna - Gallic goddess in the Moselle Valley
- Imona - a Gallic well goddess in Rauranum
- Inciona - Gallic goddess of the Treveri
- Lerina - Gallic patron goddess of Lérins Islands, companion of Lero
- Litavis - Gallic earth goddess
- Maiabus - Gallic goddess in Metz
- Matronae Dervonnae - Gallic mother goddesses in Cisalpine Gaul
- Matronae Vediantiae (Deae Vediantiae) - Gallic mother goddesses in Alpes Maritimae
- Maximia - fountain goddess in Amélie-les-Bains
- Nemetona - Celtic goddess with roots in north-eastern Gaul.
- Nehalennia - sea goddess in Zeeland
- Nantosuelta - Gallic goddess, companion of Sucellos
- Pritona - see Ritona below
- Rhiannon - late Celtic goddess associated with horses, fertility, rebirth, the moon, mercy, and justice; also known as the goddess of forgiveness and understanding; a major figure in Welsh mythology
- Ricagambeda - Brittonic goddess
- Ritona (Pritona) - Gallic goddess of the Treveri
- Rosmerta - Gallic goddess of fertility and abundance
- Sabrina - see Hafren above
- Seixomniai Leuciticai - a Celtic goddess, equated with Diana
- Senuna - Brittonic goddess
- Sequana - Gallic goddess of the River Seine
- Setlocenia - North Brittonic goddess of long life
- Silgina - goddess of springs
- Sirona - Gallic goddess of healing
- Suleviae - triune mother goddess
- Sulis - Brittonic goddess of the healing spring at Aquae Sulis (Bath)
- Tamesis - Brittonic goddess of the River Thames
- Veica Noriceia - a goddess attested in Noricum
- Verbeia - Brittonic goddess of the River Wharfe
- Vesunna - Gallic goddess of the Petrocorii
- Vibēs - a goddess in Noricum

=== Male ===
- Abandinus - a Brittonic god of Durovigutum
- Alaunus (Alaunos) - a Gallic god of healing and prophecy
- Alisanos - a Gallic god
- Alus - an agricultural god of Cisalpine Gaul
- Ambisagrus - a god in Aquileia
- Arubianus - a god in Noricum
- Atepomarus - a Gallic horse god
- Bedaius - a lake god in Noricum
- Belatucadros (Bitucadros) - a Brittonic god
- Belenus (Belenos) - a god of healing
- Bergimus - a mountain god of Cisalpine Gaul
- Borvo (Bormanos) - god of healing springs
- Brasennus - a god known from a lone inscription in Cisalpine Gaul
- Caletos
- Camulus - Brittonic deity identified with Mars
- Caturix - war god of the Helvetii
- Cernunnos (Carnonos) - an antlered god
- Cissonius - a Gallic god of trade
- Mars Cnabetius - a Gallic god of war
- Condatis - a Gallic and Brittonic god of the confluences of rivers
- Cunomaglus - a Brittonic hunter god
- Cuslanus - a god in Cisalpine Gaul associated with Jupiter
- Deus Latis - a Brittonic god
- Deus Ducavavius - a god known from a lone inscription in Cisalpine Gaul
- Deus Orevaius - a god known from a lone inscription at Cemenelum
- Dorminus - god of the hot springs at Aquae Statiellae
- Intarabus - a Gallic god of the Treveri
- Esus - a Gallic god
- Glanis - Gallic god of Glanum
- Gobannus (Gobannos) - a Gallic and Brittonic smith god
- Grannus - a healing god
- Ialonus Contrebis - a Brittonic and Gallic god
- Latobius - a god in Noricum
- Lenus - god of healing worshipped mainly in eastern Gaul, almost always identified with Mars
- Lero - Gallic patron god of Lérins Islands
- Loucetios - a Gallic god of thunder
- Luxovius - Romano-Gallic god of the waters of Luxovium (Luxeuil-les-Bains); a consort of Bricta
- Maponos - a Brittonic and Gallic god of youth
- Matunos - a Brittonic and Gallic bear god
- Moccus - a Gallic god of boars and pigs
- Moritasgus - Gallic healing god of Alesia
- Mullo - a Gallic god in Armorica
- Nemausus - Gallic god of Nîmes
- Niskus - a Brittonic river god
- Nodens (Nodons) - a Brittonic god of healing, dogs and hunting
- Ogmios - a Gallic god of eloquence
- Paronnus - a god known from a lone inscription at Brixia
- Rudiobus - a Gallic god in Loiret
- Smertrios - a Gallic god
- Souolibrogenos - a Galatian god
- Sucellus (Sucellos) - a Gallic and Brittonic god of agriculture and wine
- Tavianos - a Galatian god
- Taranis (Tanaros) - a god of thunder
- Toutatis - a tribal protector god
- Telesphorus - a Galatian god
- Tridamos - a Brittonic god
- Ucuetis - Gallic blacksmith god of Alesia
- Vellaunus - a Brittonic and Gallic god
- Vernostonos - a Brittonic god
- Vindonnus - an epithet for Belenus
- Vinotonus - a Brittonic god of Lavatrae
- Viridios - a Brittonic god of Ancaster
- Virotutis - a Gallic epithet of Apollo
- Visucius - a Gallo-Roman god of trade
- Vosegus - Gallic god of the Vosges Mountains
- Viscosus - Gallic king of the gods

== Iberian Celtic deities ==
The Celtiberians and Gallaecians were ancient Celtic peoples in Iberia. They spoke Hispano-Celtic languages.

=== Female ===
- Asidiae
- Ataegina (Ataecina)
- Besenclā (Besenclae) - a community and house protector
- Broeneiae
- Cicia or Cigia - name found in a inscription in a well in the territory of the Vaccaei; possible origin of the river name Cea
- Coruae
- Cosuneae
- Crougeae (Corougiae)
- Deae sanctae (Burrulobrigensi)
- Deiba
- Epona (Epane, Iccona)
- Erbina - a goddess of wild animals, hunting, and domestic security
- Ermae
- Flauiae Conimbriga (Flauiae Conimbrigae)
- Ilurbeda
- Lacipaea (Lacibiā, Lacibea)
- Laneana (Laneanis) - a goddess of springs and floods
- Losa
- Luna Augusta
- Mirobleo
- Munidis
- Nabia (Navia) - versatile goddess
- Nymphis
- Ocrimirae
- Reva (Reua) - personification of water flows
- Toga
- Trebaruna
- Trebopala
- Tutelae

=== Male ===
- Aernus
- Aetio
- Araco
- Ares Lusitani
- Bandua
- Bormanicus (Bormo, Borvo)
- Cariocecus
- Carneo
- Cohue
- Cosus (Cossue, Coso)
- Crouga
- Duberdicus
- Deo Nemedeco
- Deo Paramaeco
- Endovelicus
- Erriapus
- Issibaeo
- Kuanikio (Quangeio, Quangeius)
- Lugus
- Mermandiceo
- Picio
- Reo
- Salama
- Sucellus
- Tabaliaenus
- Tabudico
- Tongoenabiagus
- Turiacus
- Vorteaeceo
- Visucius

== Gaelic deities and characters ==
The Gaels inhabit Ireland, the Isle of Man and most of western and northern Scotland. They speak the Goidelic languages.

=== Female ===
- Achtland
- Aibell
- Aimend
- Aífe
- Áine - goddess of summer, wealth and sovereignty
- Airmed - goddess of healing and herbalism
- Anu - probable goddess of the earth and fertility, called "mother of the Irish gods" in Cormac's Glossary
- Bec
- Bébinn (Béfind)
- Bé Chuille
- Bodhmall
- Boann - goddess of the River Boyne, called Bouvinda by Ptolemy
- Brigit (Bríd or Bridget) - called a ‘goddess of poets’ in Cormac's Glossary, with her sisters Brigid the healer and Brigid the smith Some scholars believe that Brigit of Kildare was a Christian re-making of Brigit, but this is disputed.
- Caillech (Beira, Biróg) - an ancestral creator and weather goddess
- Canola
- Carman
- Cethlenn - wife of Balor of the Fomorians
- Clídna
- Clothru
- Danand (Danu)
- Deirdre - the foremost tragic heroine in Irish legend
- Duibne - attested as Dovinia in Archaic Irish and preserved in the name of the Corcu Duibne
- Ériu, Banba & Fódla - tutelary triumvirate of goddesses, sisters, eponymous for Ireland (mainly Ériu)
- Ernmas
- Étaín - the heroine of Tochmarc Étaíne
- Ethniu (Ethliu) - the daughter of the Fomorian leader Balor and the mother of Lugh
- Fand
- Finnabair
- Flidais
- Fuamnach
- Gráinne
- Grian
- Lí Ban
- Loígde - attested as Logiddea in Archaic Irish and preserved in the name of the Corcu Loígde
- Macha
- Medb (Medb Lethderg)
- Mongfind
- The Morrígan, Badb, Nemain - also known as "The Three Morrígna"
- Mór Muman (Mugain)
- Niamh
- Sadhbh
- Tailtiu
- Tlachtga

=== Male ===
- Abarta
- Abcán
- Abhean
- Aed
- Aengus (Óengus, Macán)
- Ailill
- Aillen
- Aí
- Balor
- Bith
- Bodb Dearg
- Bres
- Builg - a god of the Fir Bholg
- Cermait
- Cian
- Cichol
- Conand
- Crom Cruach
- The Dagda (Dáire)
- Dian Cecht - called a "god of health" in Cormac's Glossary
- Donn
- Ecne
- Elatha
- Goibniu, Credne & Luchta - called the "three gods of craft"
- Labraid
- Lén
- Lir
- Lugh - also attested as Lugus in Archaic Irish
- Mac Cuill, Mac Cecht, Mac Gréine
- Manannán mac Lir
- Miach
- Midir
- Mug Ruith
- Néit - called a "god of war" in Cormac's Glossary
- Nuada (Nechtan, Elcmar)
- Ogma
- Tethra
- Tuirenn (Delbáeth)

== Brythonic deities and characters ==
The Brythonic peoples, descendants of the Celtic Britons, inhabit western Britain (mainly Strathclyde, Wales, Cumbria and Cornwall) and Brittany. They speak the Brythonic languages.

=== Female ===
- Arianrhod
- Blodeuwedd
- Branwen
- Ceridwen
- Creiddylad
- Creirwy
- Dôn
- Gwenhwyfar
- Modron - possible derivation of Dea Matrona
- Nimue
- Olwen
- Rhiannon

=== Male ===
- Afallach
- Amaethon
- Arawn - king of the otherworld realm of Annwn
- Beli Mawr
- Bladud
- Bendigeidfran (Brân the Blessed)
- Culhwch
- Dylan ail Don
- Efnysien
- Euroswydd
- Gilfaethwy
- Gofannon (Govannon) - a smith god
- Gwern
- Gwydion
- Gwyddno Garanhir
- Gwyn ap Nudd
- Hafgan
- Lludd Llaw Eraint (Nudd)
- Llŷr
- Mabon
- Matholwch
- Manawydan
- Nisien (Nissien, Nissyen)
- Pryderi
- Pwyll
- Taliesin
- Ysbaddaden

== Works cited ==
- Adkins, Lesley; Adkins, Roy A. (2004). Handbook to life in ancient Rome (Updated ed.). New York: Facts on file. p. 283. ISBN 0-8160-5026-0.
- Anwyl, Edward (1906). Celtic Religion in Pre-Christian Times. Andover-Harvard Theological Library.
- Arenas-Esteban, J. Alberto (2010). Celtic religion across space and time: fontes epigraphici religionvm celticarvm antiqvarvm. Toledo: Junta de Comunidades de Castilla-La Mancha. ISBN 978-84-7788-589-4.
- de Bernardo Stempel, Patrizia (2003). "Die sprachliche Analyse keltischer Theonyme". Zeitschrift für celtische Philologie. 53 (1): 41–69. doi:10.1515/ZCPH.2003.41. S2CID 201278751.
- Coulter, Charles Russell; Turner, Patricia (2000). Encyclopedia of Ancient Deities. Chicago: Fitzroy Dearborn. ISBN 1-57958-270-2.
- Dimitz, August. History of Carniola. Vol. I.
- Dorcey, Peter F. (1992). The cult of Silvanus: a study in Roman folk religion. Leiden: Brill. ISBN 90-04-09601-9.
- Freeman, Philip (2017). Celtic Mythology: Tales of Gods, Goddesses, and Heroes. Oxford UP. ISBN 978-0-19-046047-1.
- "Greek & Roman Mythology - Tools". https://www2.classics.upenn.edu/myth/php/tools/dictionary.php?regexp=RHEA&method=standard.
- Green, Miranda Jane (1993). Celtic myths. Austin: U of Texas P. ISBN 0-292-72754-2.
- Keating, Geoffrey (1857). The History of Ireland from the Earliest Period to the English Invasion. P. M. Haverty.
- Koch, John T. (2006). Celtic Culture: A Historical Encyclopedia. ABC-CLIO. ISBN 1-85109-440-7.
- Kos, Marjeta Šašel (2008). "Dedicanti e Cultores nelle Reliogione Celtiche: A cura di Antonio Sartori" [Celtic divinities from Celeia and its territory: who were the dedicators?]. Quaderni di Acme. 104. CISALPINO: Istituto Editoriale Universitario. Milano: 284–86.
- Lurker, Manfred (2004). The Routledge dictionary of gods, goddesses, devils and demons (2 ed.). London: Routledge. ISBN 0-415-34018-7.
- MacCulloch, J. A. (1911). The Religion of the Ancient Celts. Edinburgh: Clark. ISBN 9780524009307.
- Mees, Bernard (2009). Celtic Curses. Boydell. ISBN 9781843834571.
- Murley, Joseph Clyde (1922). The Cults of Cisalpine Gaul as Seen in the Inscriptions. The Collegiate Press.
- Nicholson, Edward Williams Byron (1904). Keltic researches: Studies in the History and Distribution of the Ancient Goidelic Language and Peoples. Oxford UP.
- Olivares Olivares Pedreño, Juan Carlos (2005). "Celtic Gods of the Iberian Peninsula". E-Keltoi: Journal of Interdisciplinary Celtic Studies. 6: 607–649.
- Rankin, David (1998). Celts and the classical world. London: Routledge. ISBN 0-415-15090-6.
- Roymans, Nico; Derks, Ton, eds. (2009). Ethnic Constructs in Antiquity: The Role of Power and Tradition. Amsterdam: Amsterdam UP. ISBN 978-90-8964-078-9.
- Williams, Mark Andrew (2016). Ireland's Immortals: A History of the Gods of Irish Myth. Princeton UP. ISBN 9780691157313.
