= Mandubii =

Gallic tribe

The Mandubii (Gaulish: *Mandubioi) were a small Gallic tribe dwelling in and around their chief town Alesia, in modern Côte-d'Or, during the Iron Age and the Roman period.

== Name ==
An oppidum Mandubiorum is mentioned by Caesar (mid-1st c. BC), and the tribe is designated as Mandoubíōn (Μανδουβίων) by Strabo (early 1st c. AD).

The ethnonym Mandubii is a latinized form of Gaulish *Mandubioi (sing. *Mandubios). It is generally seen as deriving from the stem mandu- ('pony'). Alternatively, Pierre-Yves Lambert has proposed to compare the name with the Welsh mathru ('trample upon').

== Geography ==
The territory of the Mandubii was located in the Haux-Aixois region, between the settlements of Alesia in the north, Blessey in the east, Braux in the west, and Sombernon in the southeast. This small area

During the reign of the Roman emperor Augustus, their small territory was incorporated into the Lingonian territory. In the unstable period following the death of Nero in 68 AD, the Mandubii were excluded from the Lingonian territory and attached to the Aedui.

== History ==
Mandubian ceramics are attested in Villaines-les-Prévôtes by the 2nd century BC. While under the influence of the neighbouring and more powerful Aedui and Lingones, the Mandubii benefited from a relative autonomy (at least economic and cultural) before the Roman conquest.

Under the empire, the Mandubii formed a pagus rather than a separate civitas. The people to whom this pagus belonged is disputed. Michel Reddé holds that the Mandubii were most probably attached to the Lingones by an adtributio, while Marie-Thérèse Raepsaet-Charlier, from the epigraphy of the cults, argues that the pagus belonged to the Aedui.

== Religion ==
At Alesia, Apollo appears prominently as a local deity, presiding over the monumental sanctuary of Croix-Saint-Charles, a site occupied since the pre-Roman period. There, he is assimilated with Moritasgus, a god attested only at Alesia. Dedications have also been found to Rosmerta, and to the couples Albius and Damona, Ucuetis and Bergusia, and Mars Cicolluis with Litavis.
