= Lerina =

Lerina may refer to:

- Île Saint-Honorat (also known as "Lerina"), one of the Lérins islands in France
- Lerina (goddess), Celtic goddess of the Lérins islands
- Lerina incarnata, moth species in the monotypic genus Lerina
