= Matunos =

Matunus or Matunos is an ancient Celtic god.

== Name ==
The theonym Matunus may be derived from the Gaulish noun matu- meaning 'bear'.

== Cult ==
He was worshipped in Roman Britain and altar-stones raised to him have been recovered in the United Kingdom, such as at High Rochester (1265 [AD213]) and at Risingham.

A similarly named Gaulish god, Matutinus, is attested in at least three inscriptions from Switzerland; in all three he is identified with Mercury, and in one he is also identified with Cissonius.

The god may be parallel with Mercury Artaius, who might also have ursine connotations.
