= Cannola =

Cannola may refer to:

- A brand of marijuana-infused cooking oil, one of a number of cannabis foods

== See also ==
- Cannoli, Sicilian pastry desserts
- Canola, the edible cooking oil from rapeseed (Brassica campestris)
- Canola (mythology), the inventor of the harp in Irish myth
