= Ruad =

Ruad may refer to:

- Arwad, a small waterless island off the coast of Tortosa, Syria
- Fall of Ruad, battle around 1302 between the Egyptian Mamluks and the Crusaders
- Áed Rúad, High King of medieval Irish legend
- Ruad, Old Irish term for red, as in Red Branch
- Ruad, a Celtic goddess, rescued by the dwarf poet Abcán
