= Canola (disambiguation) =

Canola is a vegetable oil derived from rapeseed.

Canola may also refer to:

- Canola (film), a South Korean film
- Canola (mythology), the inventor of the harp in Celtic mythology
- Marco Canola (b. 1988), an Italian racing cyclist
