= Cissonius =

Gaulish epithet of the god Mercury

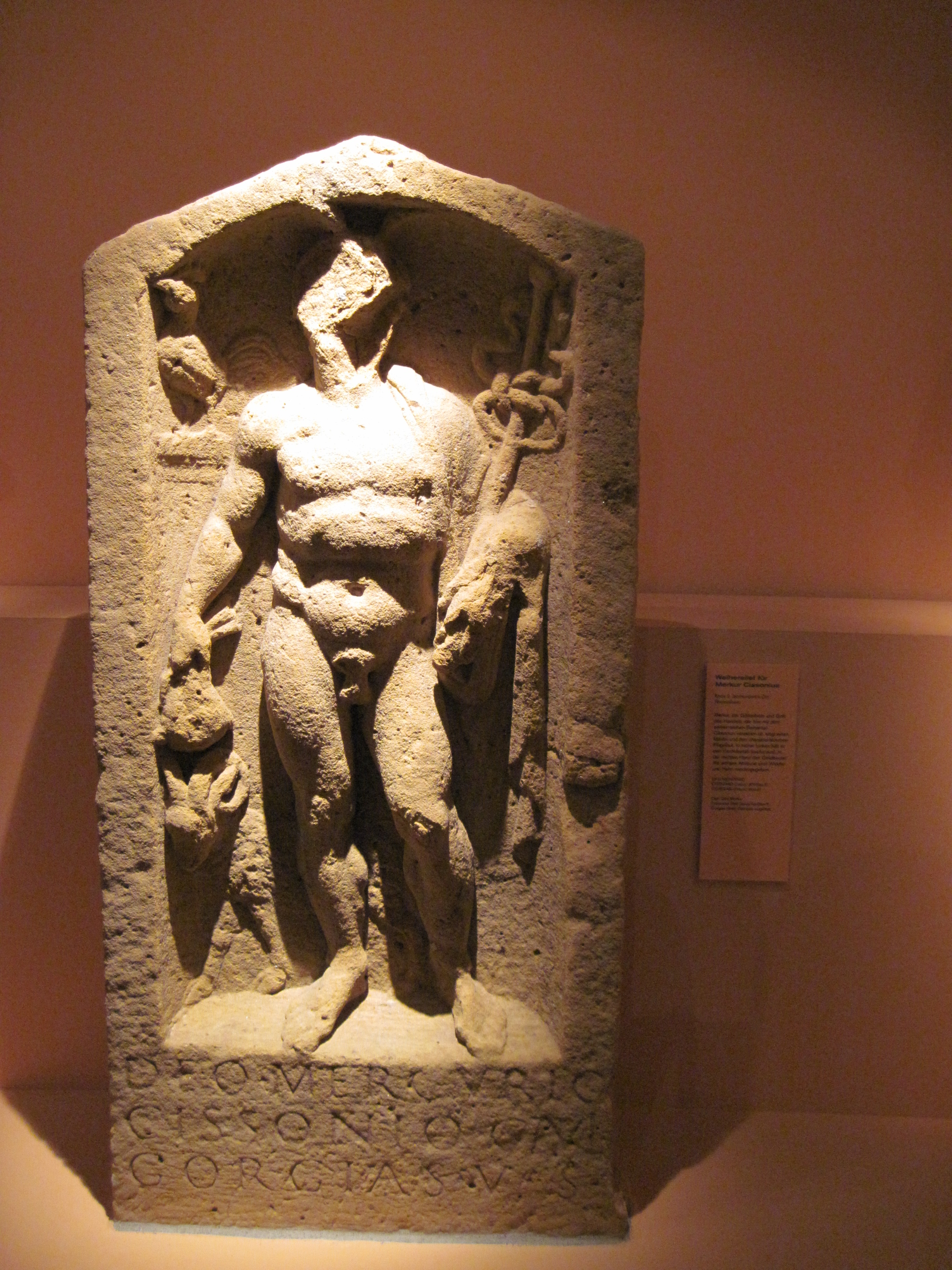
Relief of Mercury Cissonius from the Palatinate.

Cissonius (also Cisonius) is an epithet of the Roman god Mercury recorded in Latin votive inscriptions of the Gallo-Roman period. It is among the native surnames of Mercury that recur at several sites in the western provinces, with dedications concentrated in Germania Superior and the neighbouring parts of Gallia Belgica, Germania Inferior and Raetia. Most texts pair the name with Mercury as Mercurius Cissonius, although in a few dedications Cissonius is invoked without Mercury. The name is attested only in inscriptions, and its meaning is disputed.

== Name ==
The name occurs in the forms Cissonius and Cisonius. Jan de Vries also noted a variant Cessonius.

The meaning of the name is disputed. Jean-Jacques Hatt derived it from Gaulish *cissum ('carriage'), which would present Mercury as a god of carters. Xavier Delamarre instead connected the name with Gaulish *sounos ('sleep, dream') and tentatively analysed it as *cit-souno- ('bringing dreams'), while marking the derivation as uncertain. Jan de Vries noted that many of Mercury's native surnames remain obscure and that some do not look Celtic at all. (Note: The same name-form is common as a Roman personal name, the gentilicium Cissonius and the cognomen Cisso being widely attested on funerary inscriptions in Italy and the western provinces. Delamarre groups the divine surname with these personal names under the same formation.)

== Cult and interpretation ==
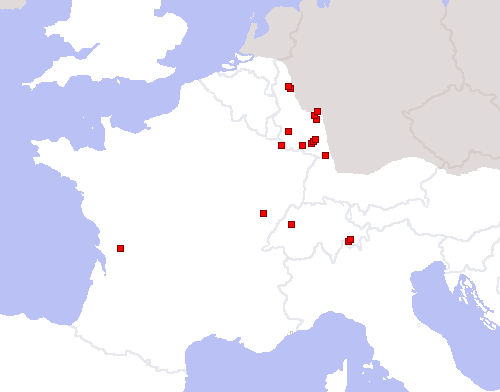
Map showing the distribution of inscriptions to Cissonius.

Mercury was the Roman god most often depicted and invoked in Gaul, and inscriptions there regularly attach a native surname to him. Cissonius is one of the epithets that recur at several places, alongside Visucius and Arvernus. James MacKillop places it among the surnames that suggest a shade of identity distinct from the Roman Mercury, and in several dedications the name is used without Mercury, as deus Cissonius.

On Hatt's etymology, William Van Andringa notes that the surname would present Mercury as a god of carters, in keeping with his role as a god of commerce and travel, and points out that at Nida the god was invoked both as Negotiator ('the trader') and as Cissonius. Native surnames of this kind are in other cases descriptive or drawn from the place of the cult, but the reading of Cissonius rests on the disputed etymology, and the god's character beyond his identification with Mercury is not otherwise defined.

== Epigraphy ==
Cissonius is known only from Latin inscriptions of the imperial period. Most of the dedications come from Germania Superior, chiefly the Rhineland and the Swiss plateau, with outliers in Gallia Belgica, Germania Inferior and Raetia.

At Vesontio a woman named Dubitatia Castula, described as Syrian by origin, rebuilt at her own expense a temple and portico of Mercurius Cissonius that had fallen into ruin, evidence that the god had an established sanctuary in the town. At Augusta Treverorum, the chief city of the Treveri, Mercury was worshipped in the Altbachtal precinct. The principal dedication there gives him no native surname, but fragmentary inscriptions from the town record him as Cissonius and as Visucius.

Text	Find-spot	Divine name(s)	Translation	Reference	Comments
Deo Mercur(io) Cisso(nio) L(ucius) C(...) Patern(us) ex voto	Aventicum (Germania Superior)	Mercurius Cissonius	To the god Mercurius Cissonius, Lucius C(...) Paternus, in fulfilment of a vow.	CIL XIII, 11476	Late 1st to early 2nd century AD.
Deo Mercurio Cissonio Dubitatia Castula natione Syria templum et porticus vetustate conla(p)sum denuo de suo restituit	Vesontio (Germania Superior)	Mercurius Cissonius	To the god Mercurius Cissonius, Dubitatia Castula, Syrian by origin, restored at her own expense the temple and portico that had collapsed through age.	CIL XIII, 5373	2nd century AD. Records the rebuilding of a temple and portico of the god. Also published as ILS 4598.
Mercurio Cissonio aram [L]utevius [V]icto[ri] [nus]	Nida (Heddernheim) (Germania Superior)	Mercurius Cissonius	To Mercurius Cissonius, Lutevius Victorinus (dedicated this) altar.	CIL XIII, 7359	2nd to 3rd century AD.
Deo Mercurio Cissonio C(aius) Atu[l(ius)] Gorgias v(otum) s(olvit)	Rheinzabern (Germania Superior)	Mercurius Cissonius	To the god Mercurius Cissonius, Caius Atulius Gorgias fulfilled his vow.	CIL XIII, 6085	2nd to 3rd century AD. From Rheinzabern (Tabernae).
D(eo) Cissonio Gittonius Pippausus v(otum) s(olvit) l(ibens) l(aetus) m(erito)	Argentorate (Germania Superior)	Cissonius	To the god Cissonius, Gittonius Pippausus fulfilled his vow willingly, gladly and deservedly.	CIL XIII, 11607	3rd century AD. Cissonius invoked without Mercury.
Deo Cis(s)onio ex voto posu(i)t Paternus [...]	Hohenbourg (Germania Superior)	Cissonius	To the god Cissonius, Paternus set (this) up in fulfilment of a vow.	CIL XIII, 6119	2nd to 3rd century AD. Cissonius invoked without Mercury.
[Mercu]r(io) Cis[sonio ...]	Stettfeld (Germania Superior)	Mercurius Cissonius	To Mercurius Cissonius ...	CIL XIII, 6345	Fragmentary. The restoration to Mercurius is uncertain. 2nd to 3rd century AD.
[Me]rc(urio) Cisson[io] [...]	Augusta Treverorum (Gallia Belgica)	Mercurius Cissonius	To Mercurius Cissonius ...	CIL XIII, 3659	Fragmentary. From the territory of the Treveri.
Deo Cissonio P[...] l(ibens) s(olvit)	Territory of the Mediomatrici (Creutzwald) (Gallia Belgica)	Cissonius	To the god Cissonius, P(...) willingly fulfilled (his vow).	CIL XIII, 4500	Cissonius invoked without Mercury.
Mercurio Cissonio Lari[ni]us Sen[i]lis v(otum) s(olvit) l(ibens) m(erito)	Colonia Claudia Ara Agrippinensium (Germania Inferior)	Mercurius Cissonius	To Mercurius Cissonius, Larinius Senilis fulfilled his vow willingly and deservedly.	CIL XIII, 8237	2nd to 3rd century AD.
Mercurio Cissonio pro bon[o] comm[uni] [...]	Promontogno (Raetia)	Mercurius Cissonius	To Mercurius Cissonius, for the common good ...	AE 1992, 1299	3rd century AD. From the sanctuary in the Val Bregaglia, made for the benefit of the community. Also published as RIS 306.
Mercurio [C]issonio [M]atutino [V]alerius [Ge]rmani [...]	Promontogno (Raetia)	Mercurius Cissonius Matutinus	To Mercurius Cissonius Matutinus, Valerius, son of Germanus ...	AE 1992, 1300	3rd century AD. Here Cissonius is combined with the further epithet Matutinus ('of the morning'). Also published as RIS 307.

== See also ==
- Mercury in Gaul
- Visucius
- List of Celtic deities
