= Arvernus =

Gaulish epithet of Mercury

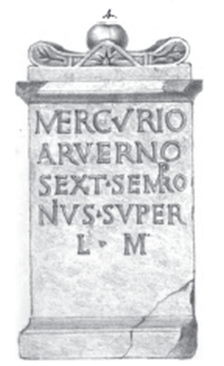
Drawing of an altar to Mercury Arvernus found at Gripswald along with a group of votive altars and reliefs dedicated to the Matronae

In Gallo-Roman religion, Arvernus was the tribal god of the Arverni and an epithet of the Gaulish Mercury. Although the name refers to the Arverni, whose territory Mercury had at important sanctuary at the Puy-de-Dôme in the Massif Central, all of the inscriptions to Mercury Arvernus are found further away along the Rhenish frontier. The similar name Mercury Arvernorix, ‘king of the Arverni’, is also recorded once. Compare also the title Mercury Dumiatis (‘of the Puy-de-Dôme’), found in the territory of the Arverni. The name, like the name of the Arverni and of Auvergne, appears to derive from a Proto-Celtic compound adjective *φara-werno-s ‘in front of alders’.
