= Virotutis =

Byname of the Gaulish Apollo

Virotutis was an ancient Celtic healing god worshipped in Gaul. He is known only from two Latin votive inscriptions, in which it is joined to the name of Apollo under the interpretatio romana as Apollo Virotutis. The first is a securely read dedication from Boutae (modern Annecy), among the Allobroges, and the second a fragmentary and heavily restored one from Noviodunum (Jublains), the chief town of the Diablintes. His cult has been linked to healing waters, which is common in Gaul for local equivalents of Apollo: the Annecy inscription was reportedly found near a curative spring and a thermal spring is known at Jublains. The name has been traditionally rendered 'benefactor of men' or 'protector of men', though the etymology remains debated.

== Name ==
Virotutis is known only from two Latin votive inscriptions, where the name appears in the dative as Virotuti. In both the god is invoked as Apollo Virotutis, though only the first preserves the epithet intact.

The name Virotutis is a Gaulish compound of viro- and -tut-. Both elements are ambiguous, and the name resists a single interpretation. For the first element, Gaulish has two homonyms, one meaning 'man' (Proto-Celtic *wiro-, Old Irish fer, Welsh gwr), the other 'true' (*wīro-, Old Irish fír, Welsh gwir), distinguished in Gaulish by the length of their first vowel. The second element is equally uncertain. It has been connected with Gaulish touto- 'people, tribe' (Old Irish túath 'people'), with the homonymous touto- 'left' (Old Irish túath 'left, north'), and with a separate stem tuto- 'vulva' (Old Irish toth).

The rendering most often given is 'benefactor of men' or 'protector of men'. Jan de Vries glossed the name 'benefactor of men', and Paul-Marie Duval 'benefactor or healer of men'. Miranda Aldhouse-Green and James MacKillop render it 'benefactor of humanity'. Joseph Loth and Joseph Vendryes explained the name through an archaic Celtic term meaning 'good' or 'favourable', used euphemistically for the left side because of its negative associations, and interpreted it as 'true protector' or 'protector of men'. On a different reading, Patrizia de Bernardo Stempel analysed it as *wiro-tūt-s ('endowed with virility'), taking it an equivalent of the Greek epithet of Apollo ársīn ('the Male'; ἄρσην). Both Xavier Delamarre and Ranko Matasović connect it instead, with some uncertainties, to tuto- ('vulva'). Delamarre stresses the cultural weight of the notion of 'truth' among the Celts and on that ground favours *wīro- ('true') over *wiro- ('man') for most names, without deciding the point for the theonym itself.

The theonym may also survive in later French place-names. Vertus (Marne) has been derived from Gaulish *Vīrotūtion ('estate of Virotutis'), and Vertuzey (Meuse) from *Vīrotūtiācon ('domain of Virotutis'). The toponyms Fontaine des Vertus (Nièvre) and Sainte-Vertu (Yonne) have likewise been connected with the god.

== Cult ==
Various epithets of Apollo are attested in Gaul, but a larger number, Virotutis among them, are rare and purely local.

Apollo Virotutis is named only at two places in Roman Gaul. The one securely read dedication comes from Boutae (modern Annecy), and was set up by a certain Titus Rutilius Buricus. A second inscription, from Noviodunum (Jublains), the chief town of the Diablintes, is broken and heavily restored, and the reading of the divine name is uncertain. Only the letters -otuti survive, the opening Apollini Vir- being a modern restoration.

== Interpretation ==
Virotutis is commonly seen as a healing god. It belongs to the deities the Gauls identified with Apollo, and Julius Caesar recorded that they held Apollo as a healer who drove away disease.

Several sanctuaries to the Gaulish Apollo lay at curative or thermal springs. Valéry Raydon notes that a thermal spring is known at Jublains, although its connection with the dedication to Virotutis is uncertain, and that the inscription from Fins d’Annecy was reportedly found near a spring with curative properties. He also observes that two place names linked to healing waters, Fontaine des Vertus, at the presumed site of an ancient water sanctuary, and Sainte-Vertu, a hamlet associated with a healing spring, have been interpreted as deriving from the theonym. Paul-Marie Duval read Virotutis as a beneficent healer of men and an Apollo likened to a natural force such as the sun or thermal water. He regarded this specifically curative character as a Gaulish addition to the Roman god.

Whether the various Gaulish bynames attached to Apollo always denote distinct native gods is disputed. The most frequent epithets, such as Belenus, Borvo and Grannus, have been read as originally independent deities later merged with Apollo, though Jan de Vries held that no such independence could be assumed for a name as rare and local as Virotutis.

== Epigraphy ==
Virotutis is named in two Latin votive inscriptions from Roman Gaul, one from Gallia Narbonensis and one from Gallia Lugdunensis. In the first, the god is invoked as Apollo Virotutis, preserving the epithet intact. The second is broken and heavily restored, the name Apollini being entirely reconstructed.

Text	Find-spot	Divine name(s)	Translation	Reference	Comments
Apoll(ini) Virotuti T(itus) Rutil(ius) Buricus [...]	Boutae (Fins d’Annecy)	Apollo Virotutis	To Apollo Virotutis, Titus Rutilius Buricus [...].	CIL XII, 2525	The only secure attestation of the epithet, from Gallia Narbonensis, on the territory of the Allobroges. The name Virotuti is preserved in full. The text breaks off after the dedicant's name.
[Apollini Vir]otuti(?) [...]avorix [...]miani [d(e) s(uo)] d(edit)	Noviodunum (Jublains)	Apollo Virotutis (restored)	[To Apollo Vir]otutis(?), [...]avorix, son of [...]mianus, gave it at his own expense.	CIL XIII, 3185	Broken and heavily restored. Only -otuti survives of the divine name, read with reserve, and Apollini Vir- is supplied. From Noviodunum, the chief town of the Diablintes, in Gallia Lugdunensis. The dedicant bears a Gaulish name.
