= Alisanos =

Gallo-Roman god

Alisanos (latinized as Alisanus) was a local Celtic god worshipped near Dijon (modern Côte-d'Or, France).

== Name ==
The theonym Alisanos is generally connected with the Gaulish word alisia, which may denote either a 'rock, boulder, rocky height' (cf. Old Irish ail 'rock, boulder') or the 'whitebeam' (source of French alisier 'whitebeam'; ultimately from a Proto-Indo-European term for 'alder'). On this basis, Alisanos has been interpreted either as a deity associated with rocky features of the landscape or as a god of whitebeams or alders. An alternative etymology, deriving the name from a river name Alisos, has also been suggested. Most Celticists nevertheless traditionally interpret Alisanos as a 'god of the rock', viewing him as an expression of Celtic animism, the belief that natural features of the landscape were endowed with their own divine presence.

The same root appears in the toponym Alesia, located further north in Burgundy. Some scholars has thus proposed to interpret him as a 'topical god of Alesia', and possibly the eponymous spirit of the site. However, this interpretation is weakened by the existence of other toponyms and anthroponyms formed from the same root that have no connection with Alesia. Patrizia de Bernardo Stempel has further objected that the cult of 'eponymous town deities' appears to be a development of the Gallo-Roman period, probably under Roman influence, which would be difficult to reconcile with a pre-Roman origin for the god.

== Epigraphy ==
Alisanus is named on two dedicatory inscriptions, one in Gaulish and one in Latin, engraved on bronze votive bowls (paterae) from Couchey and from Visignot, a hamlet of Viévy, in the Côte-d'Or.

Text	Find-spot	Divine name(s)	Translation	Reference	Comments
Doiros Segomari ieuru Alisanu	Couchey (Côte-d'Or)	Alisanos	Doiros, son of Segomaros, dedicated (this) to Alisanos.	CIL XIII, 5468	The dedication is in Gaulish, on a bronze patera.
Deo Alisano Paullinus pro Contedio fil(io) suo v(otum) s(olvit) l(ibens) m(erito)	Visignot, Viévy (Côte-d'Or)	Alisanus	To the god Alisanus, Paullinus fulfilled his vow willingly and deservedly on behalf of his son Contedius.	CIL XIII, 2843	On a bronze patera. The second D of Contedio is cut as O. Also published as ILS 4666.
