= Luxovius =

In Gallo-Roman religion, Luxovios, Latinized as Luxovius, was the god of the waters of Luxeuil, worshiped in Gaul. He was a consort of Bricta. The thermal spring sanctuary at Luxeuil provided evidence of the worship of other deities, including the sky-horseman who bears a solar wheel, and Sirona, another deity associated with healing springs.

== Inscriptions ==
Luxovius is recorded in the following two inscriptions, both from Luxeuil-les-Bains :

[Lus]soio / et Brictae / Divixti/us Cons/tans / v(otum) s(olvit) <l=T>(ibens) m(erito)

"To Lusso(v)ios and Bricta, Divixtius Constans freely and deservedly fulfilled his vow." (CIL 13, 05425)

Luxovio / et Brixtae / G(aius) Iul(ius) Fir/manus / v(otum) s(olvit) l(ibens) m(erito)

"To Luxovios and Brixta, Gaius Julius Firmans freely and deservedly fulfilled his vow." (AE 1951, 00231; CIL 13, 05426)

== Etymology ==
The name Luxovios implies light symbolism, derived from a Proto-Indo-European stem *leuk- 'light', 'whiteness'. This may indicate that the god was a deity of both light and curative spring waters, two elements that were strongly linked in the Celtic world.

== Bibliography ==
- Année Epigraphique volume 1951
- Corpus Inscriptionum Latinarum (CIL), volume 13, Tres Galliae
- Dictionary of Celtic Myth and Legend. Miranda Green. Thames and Hudson Ltd. London. 1997
