= Erriapus (deity) =

Ancient Celtic deity

Erriapus (also Eriapus) was a tutelary deity worshipped in southern Gaul.

Several inscriptions to the god are known. There was an important cult site to him at Saint-Béat (Haute-Garonne).

One image is known of him, a stone altar of the 2nd century CE found in Saint-Béat on which he is identified as D(eo) Erriape. In this image, he is depicted naked and with a club. His iconography shows the influence of the Roman god Silvanus.

He may be the protective deity of the Montagne d'Arrie in Saint-Béat (as Daniel Nony and Michel Labrousse suggest) or of a local spring (as Carole Billod suggests).
