= Mercury (mythology) =

Roman god of trade, merchants and travel

- God of commerce, eloquence, messages, communication, travelers, boundaries, luck, trickery, financial gain, merchants, thieves
- Member of the Dii Consentes
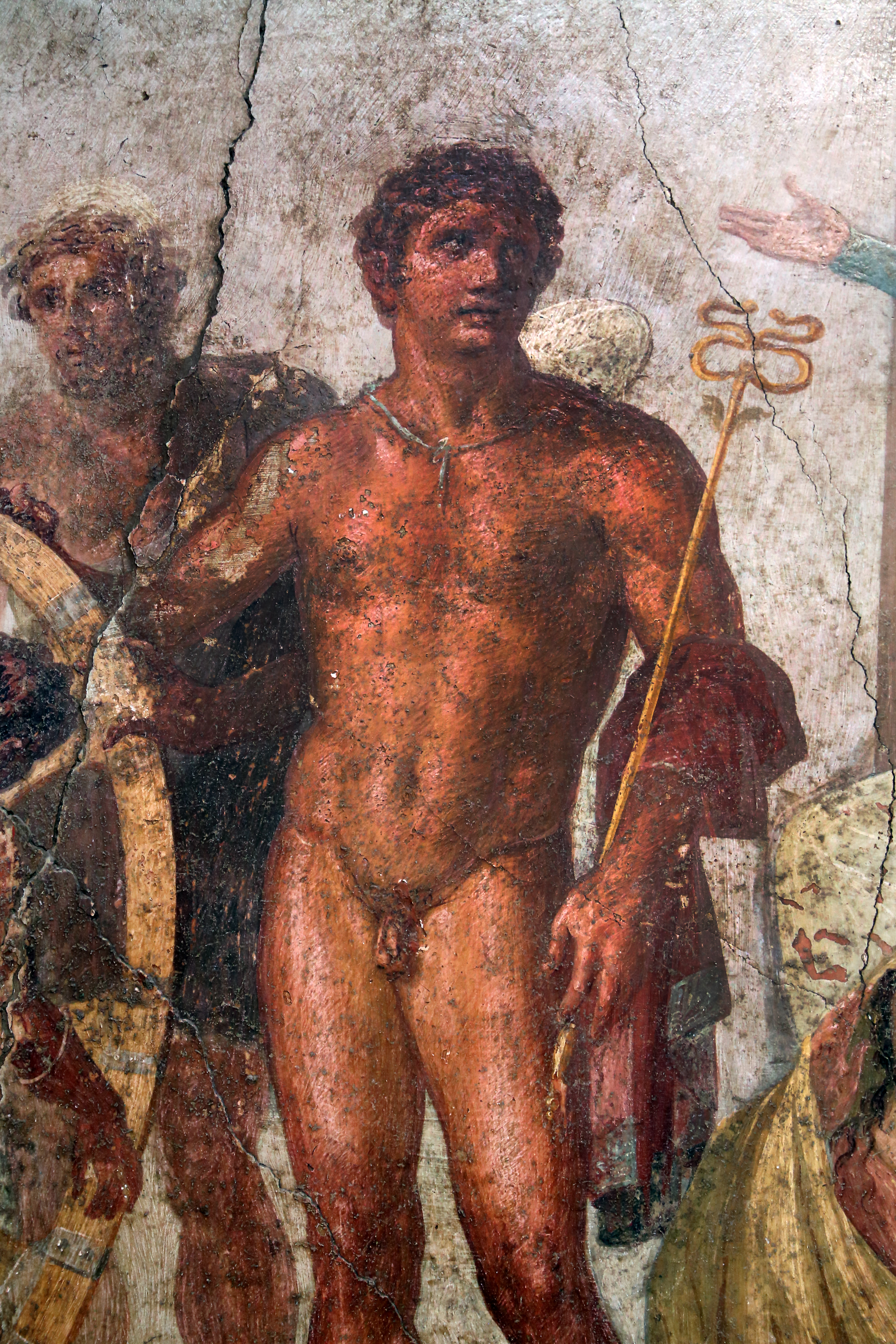
- Mercury-Hermes, antique fresco from Pompeii
- Planet: Mercury
- Symbol: Caduceus, winged sandals, winged hat, tortoise, ram and rooster
- Day: Wednesday (dies Mercurii)

Genealogy
- Parents: Jupiter and Maia or Caelus and Dies (Cicero and Hyginus)
- Consort: Larunda
- Children: Lares

Equivalents
- Etruscan: Turms
- Greek: Hermes
- Egyptian: Thoth or Anubis
- Celtic: Lugus

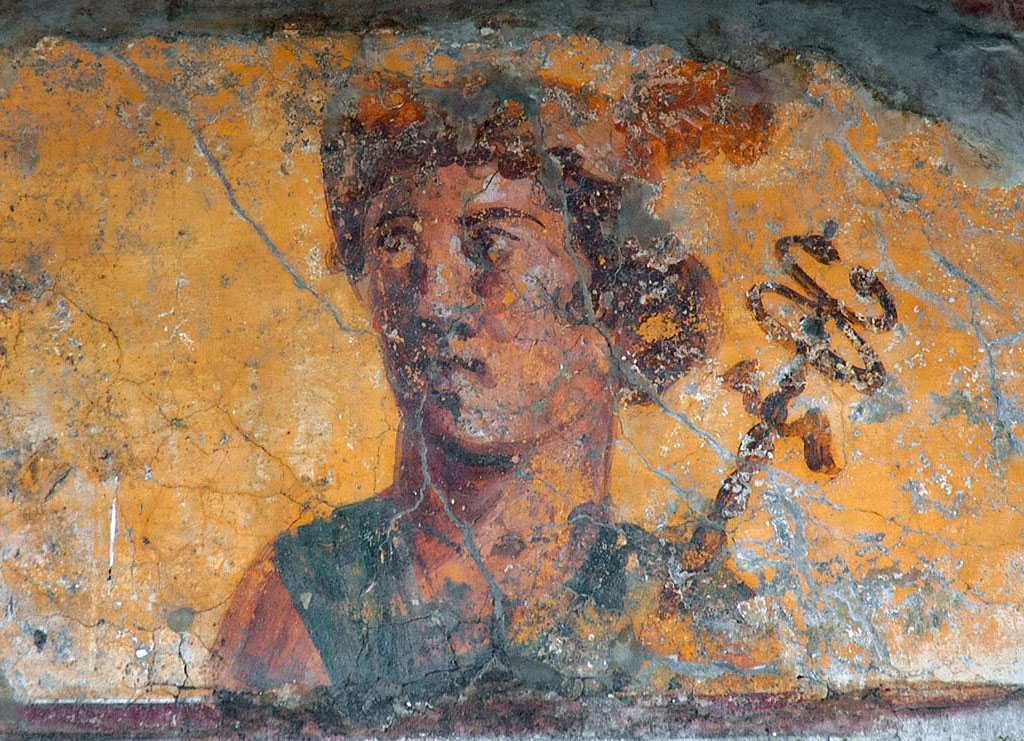
Fresco of Mercury-Hermes in Pompeii, 1st century

Mercury (/ˈmɜːrkjʊri/; Latin: Mercurius [mɛrˈkʊrijʊs]) is a major god in Roman religion and mythology, being one of the 12 Dii Consentes within the ancient Roman pantheon. He is the god of boundaries, commerce, communication (including divination), eloquence, financial gain, languages, luck, thieves, travelers, and trickery; he is also the guide of souls to the underworld.

In Roman mythology, he was the son of Maia, daughter of the Titan Atlas, and Jupiter. In his earliest forms, he appears to have been related to the Etruscan deity Turms; both gods share characteristics with the Greek god Hermes. He is often depicted holding the caduceus in his left hand. Similar to his Greek equivalent Hermes, he was awarded a magic wand by Apollo, which later turned into the caduceus, the staff with intertwined snakes.

== Etymology ==
The name "Mercury" is possibly related to the Latin words merx ("merchandise"; cf. merchant, commerce, etc.), mercari (to trade), and merces (wages); another possible connection is the Proto-Indo-European root merĝ- for "boundary, border" (cf. Old English "mearc", Old Norse "mark" and Latin "margō") and Greek οὖρος (by analogy of Arctūrus/Ἀρκτοῦρος), as the "keeper of boundaries," referring to his role as bridge between the upper and lower worlds. Also to note, per Matasović the terms merx and margō are cognates via PIE, cf. typologically Mongolian зах "border, boundary, edge; market, bazaar".

== History ==
Mercury did not appear among the numinous di indigetes of early Roman religion. Rather, he subsumed the earlier Dei Lucrii as Roman religion was syncretized with Greek religion during the time of the Roman Republic, starting around the 4th century BC. He was one of the Di Novensides ("New Gods") of Greek origin. He has been compared to the Etruscan Turms having similar characteristics. From the beginning, Mercury had essentially the same aspects as Hermes, wearing winged shoes (talaria) and a winged hat (petasos), and carrying the caduceus, a herald's staff with two entwined snakes that was Apollo's gift to Hermes. He was often accompanied by a rooster, herald of the new day, a ram or goat, symbolizing fertility, and a tortoise, referring to Mercury's legendary invention of the lyre from a tortoise shell.

Like Hermes, he was also a god of messages, eloquence and of trade, particularly of the grain trade. He was the patron of travelers and the god of thievery as well. Mercury was also considered a god of abundance and commercial success, particularly in Gaul, where he was said to have been particularly revered. He was also, like Hermes, the Romans' psychopomp, leading newly deceased souls to the afterlife. Additionally, Ovid wrote that Mercury carried Morpheus's dreams from the valley of Somnus to sleeping humans.

Archeological evidence from Pompeii suggests that Mercury was among the most popular of Roman gods. The god of commerce was depicted on two early bronze coins of the Roman Republic, the sextans and the semuncia.

== Syncretism ==
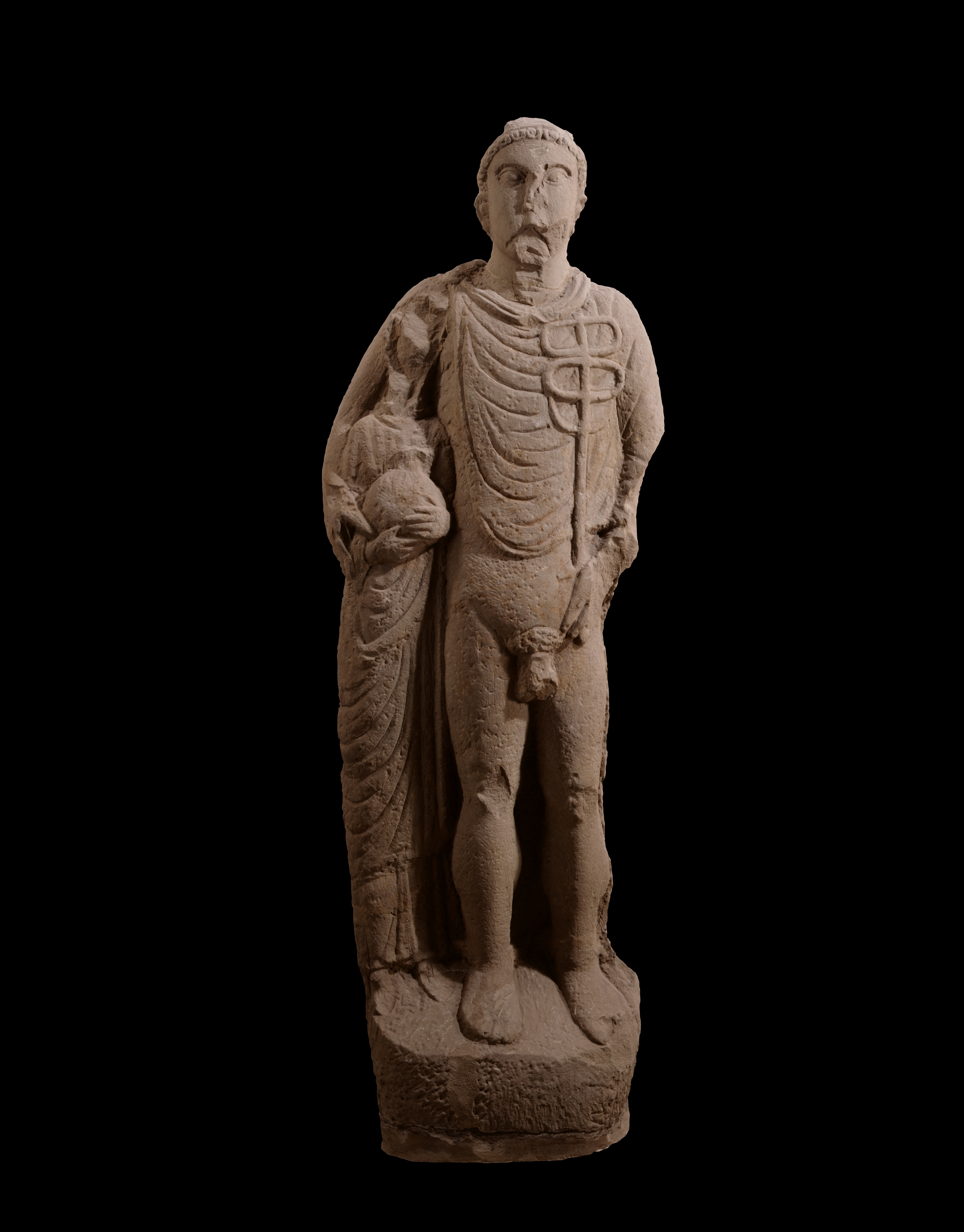
Statue of Mercury and Rosmerta (with Rosmerta's head broken off), found in Sulz am Neckar and dated to the second half to the 2nd century AD

When they described the gods of Celtic and Germanic tribes, rather than considering them separate deities, the Romans interpreted them as local manifestations or aspects of their own gods, a cultural trait called the interpretatio romana. Mercury, in particular, was reported as becoming extremely popular among the nations the Roman Empire conquered; Julius Caesar wrote of Mercury being the most popular god in Britain and Gaul, regarded as the inventor of all the arts. This is probably because, in the Roman syncretism, Mercury was equated with the Celtic god Lugus, and in this aspect was commonly accompanied by the Celtic goddess Rosmerta. Although Lugus may originally have been a deity of light or the sun (though this is disputed), similar to the Roman Apollo, his importance as a god of trade made him more comparable to Mercury, and Apollo was instead equated with the Celtic deity Belenus.

Romans associated Mercury with the Germanic god Wotan, by interpretatio romana; 1st-century Roman writer Tacitus identifies him as the chief god of the Germanic peoples. This association of Mercury and Wotan is seen in the English language day-name Wednesday and the French Mercredi.

== Names and epithets ==
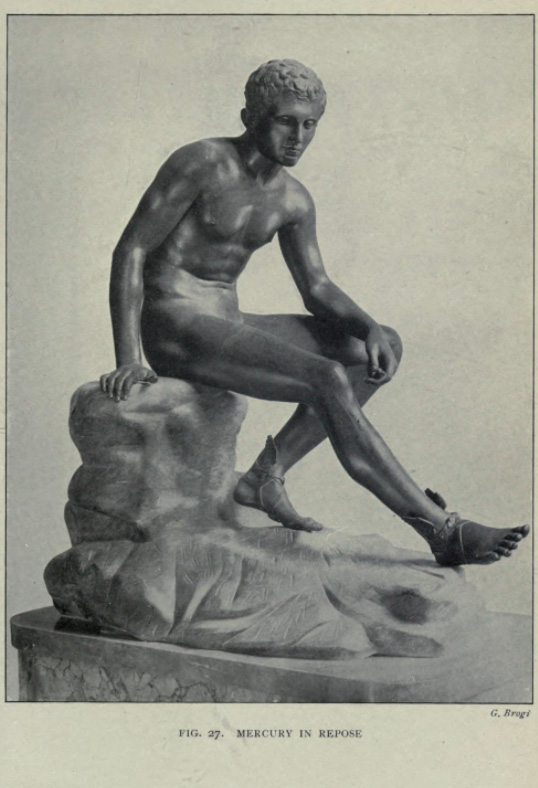
Seated Hermes, excavated at the Villa of the Papyri.

Mercury is known to the Romans as Mercurius and occasionally in earlier writings as Merqurius, Mirqurios or Mircurios, had a number of epithets representing different aspects or roles, or representing syncretisms with non-Roman deities. The most common and significant of these epithets included the following:

- Mercurius Artaios, a syncretism of Mercury with the Celtic god Artaios, a deity of bears and hunting who was worshipped at Beaucroissant, France.
- Mercurius Arvernus, a syncretism of the Celtic Arvernus with Mercury. Arvernus was worshipped in the Rhineland, possibly as a particular deity of the Arverni tribe, though no dedications to Mercurius Arvernus occur in their territory in the Auvergne region of central France.
- Mercurius Cimbrianus, a syncretism of Mercury with a god of the Cimbri sometimes thought to represent Odin.
- Mercurius Cissonius, a combination of Mercury with the Celtic god Cissonius, who is written of in the area spanning from Cologne, Germany to Saintes, France.
- Mercurius Esibraeus, a syncretism of the Iberian deity Esibraeus with the Roman deity Mercury. Esibraeus is mentioned only in an inscription found at Medelim, Portugal, and is possibly the same deity as Banda Isibraiegus, who is invoked in an inscription from the nearby village of Bemposta.
- Mercurius Gebrinius, a syncretism of Mercury with the Celtic or Germanic Gebrinius, known from an inscription on an altar in Bonn, Germany.
- Mercurius Moccus, from a Celtic god, Moccus, who was equated with Mercury, known from evidence at Langres, France. The name Moccus ("pig") implies that this deity was connected to boar-hunting.
- Mercurius Sobrius ("Mercury the Teetotaler"), a syncretism of Mercury with a Carthaginian god of commerce.
- Mercurius Visucius, a syncretism of the Celtic god Visucius with the Roman god Mercury, attested in an inscription from Stuttgart, Germany. Visucius was worshipped primarily in the frontier area of the empire in Gaul and Germany. Although he was primarily associated with Mercury, Visucius was also sometimes linked to the Roman god Mars, as a dedicatory inscription to "Mars Visucius" and Visucia, Visicius' female counterpart, was found in Gaul.

== In ancient literature ==
In Virgil's Aeneid, Mercury reminds Aeneas of his mission to found the city of Rome. In Ovid's Fasti, Mercury is assigned to escort the nymph Larunda to the underworld. Mercury, however, falls in love with Larunda and has sex with her on the way. Larunda thereby becomes mother to two children, referred to as the Lares, invisible household gods.

== Temple ==
Mercury's temple in Rome was situated in the Circus Maximus, between the Aventine and Palatine Hills, and was built in 495 BC.

That year saw disturbances at Rome between the patrician senators and the plebeians, which led to a secession of the plebs in the following year. At the completion of its construction, a dispute emerged between the consuls Appius Claudius Sabinus Regillensis and Publius Servilius Priscus Structus as to which of them should have the honour of dedicating the temple.

The Roman Senate referred the decision to the popular assembly, and also decreed that whichever was chosen should also exercise additional duties, including presiding over the markets, establish a merchants' guild, and exercising the functions of the pontifex maximus. The people, because of the ongoing public discord, and in order to spite the senate and the consuls, instead awarded the honour of dedicating the temple to Marcus Laetorius, the senior military officer of one of the legions. The senate and the consuls, in particular the conservative Appius, were outraged at this decision, and it inflamed the ongoing situation.

The dedication occurred on 15 May, 495 BC.

The temple was regarded as a fitting place to worship a swift god of trade and travel, since it was a major center of commerce as well as a racetrack. Since it stood between the plebeian stronghold on the Aventine and the patrician center on the Palatine, it also emphasized the role of Mercury as a mediator.

== Worship ==
Because Mercury was not one of the early deities surviving from the Roman Kingdom, he was not assigned a flamen (priest), but he did have his own major festival, on 15 May, the Mercuralia. During the Mercuralia, merchants sprinkled water from his sacred well near the Porta Capena on their heads.

== In popular culture ==
Mercury features in the first published comic book story of Jack Kirby, Mercury in the 20th Century, published in Red Raven Comics 1, 1940.

The United States' so-called Mercury dime, issued from 1916 to 1945, actually features a Winged Liberty and not the god Mercury, but despite wearing a Phrygian cap instead of a winged helm, the coin bears his name due to resemblance.

The United States E-6B aircraft flown by the United States Navy is a communications platform named after the god.

== Gallery ==
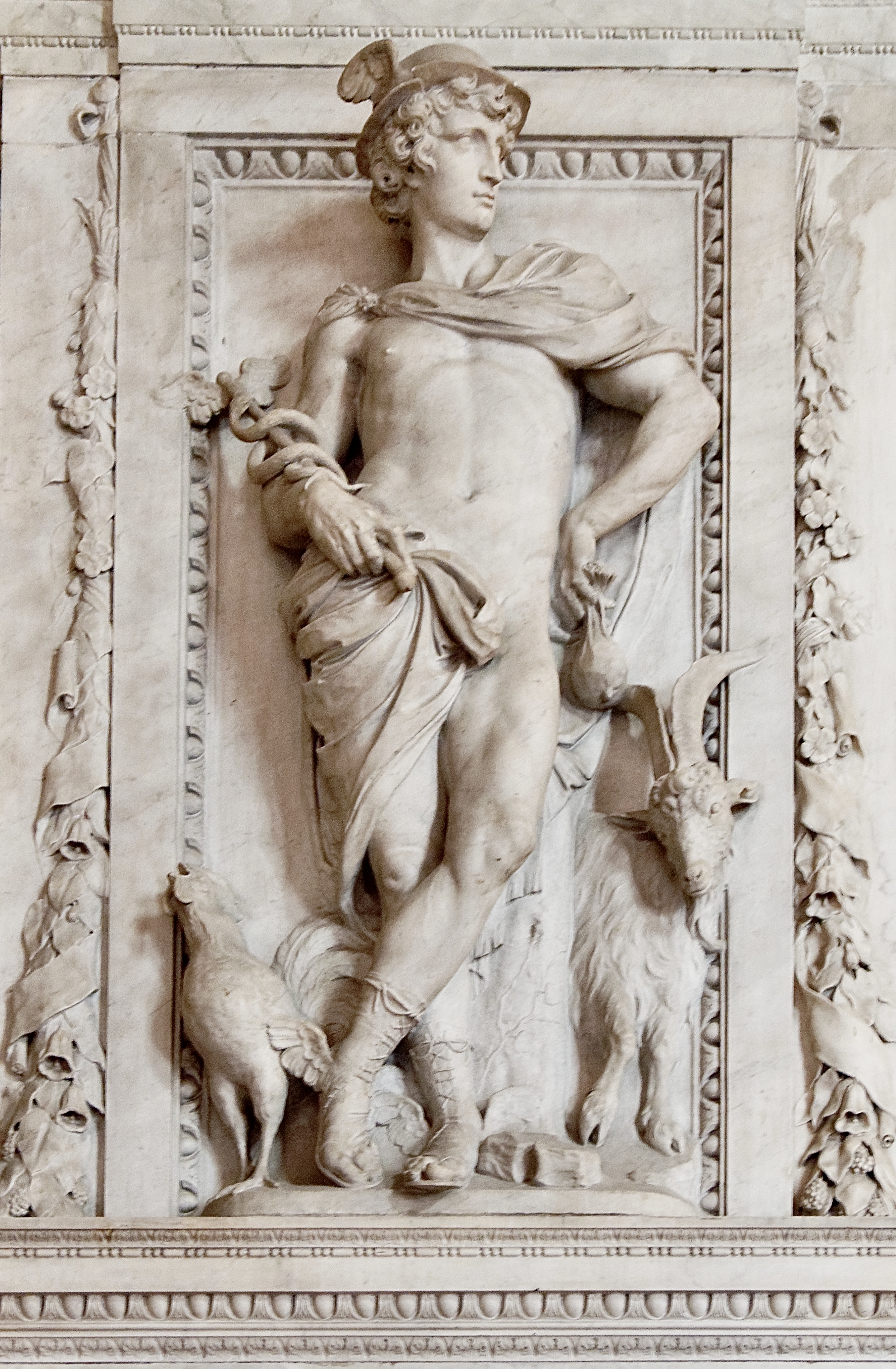
Mercurius by Artus Quellinus the Elder, mid 17th century.

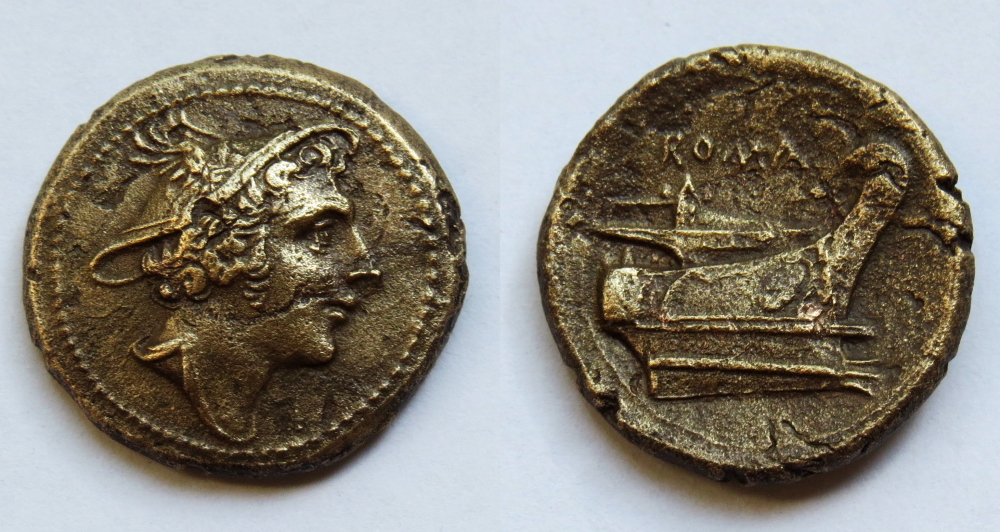
Mercury portrait on a bronze semuncia (215–211 BC)

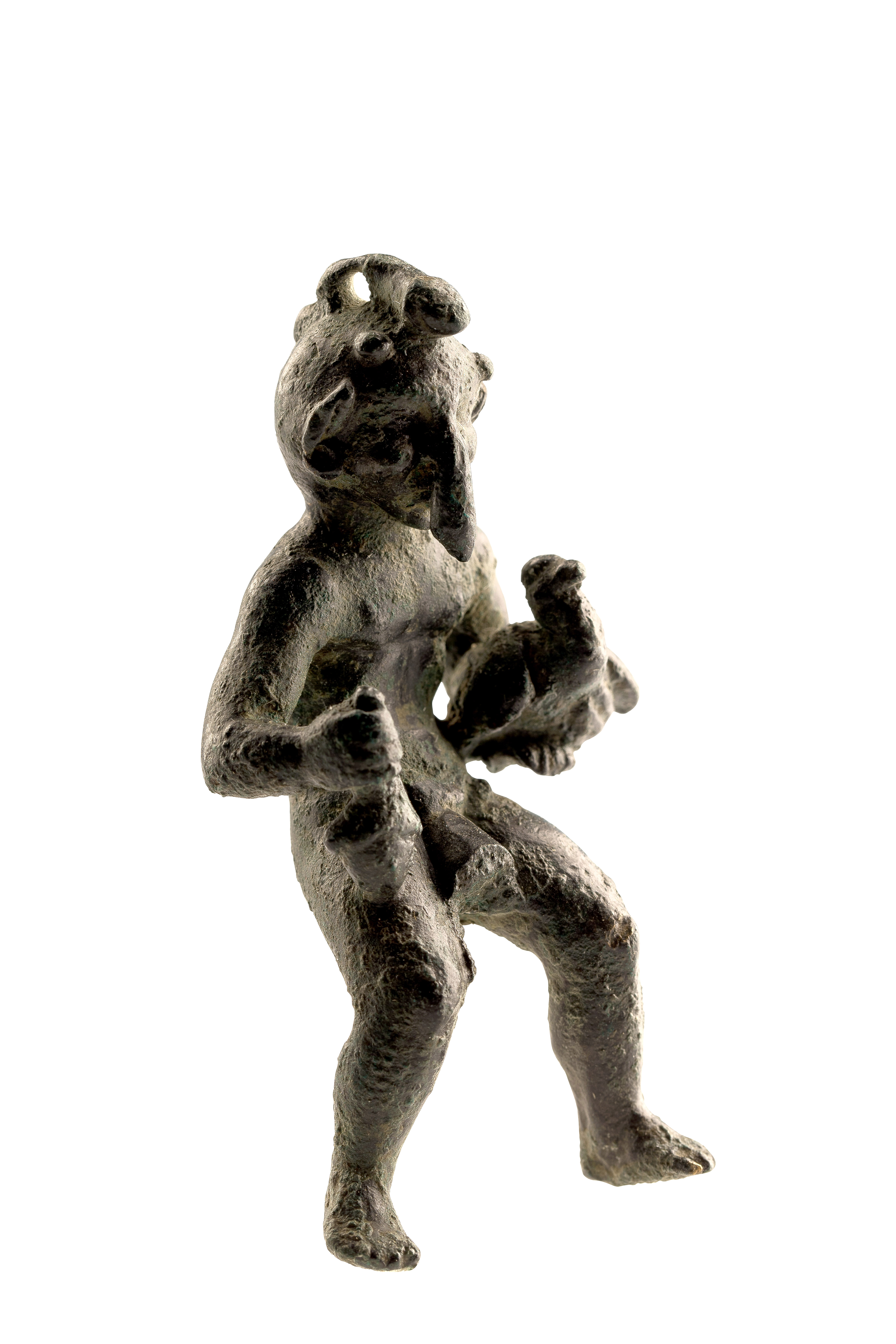
Bronze figurine of Mercury with three phalluses, with rooster in the left hand and money bag in the right hand, 100 to 250 A.D., found in Tongeren, ca 8.8 cm Gallo-Roman Museum (Tongeren)

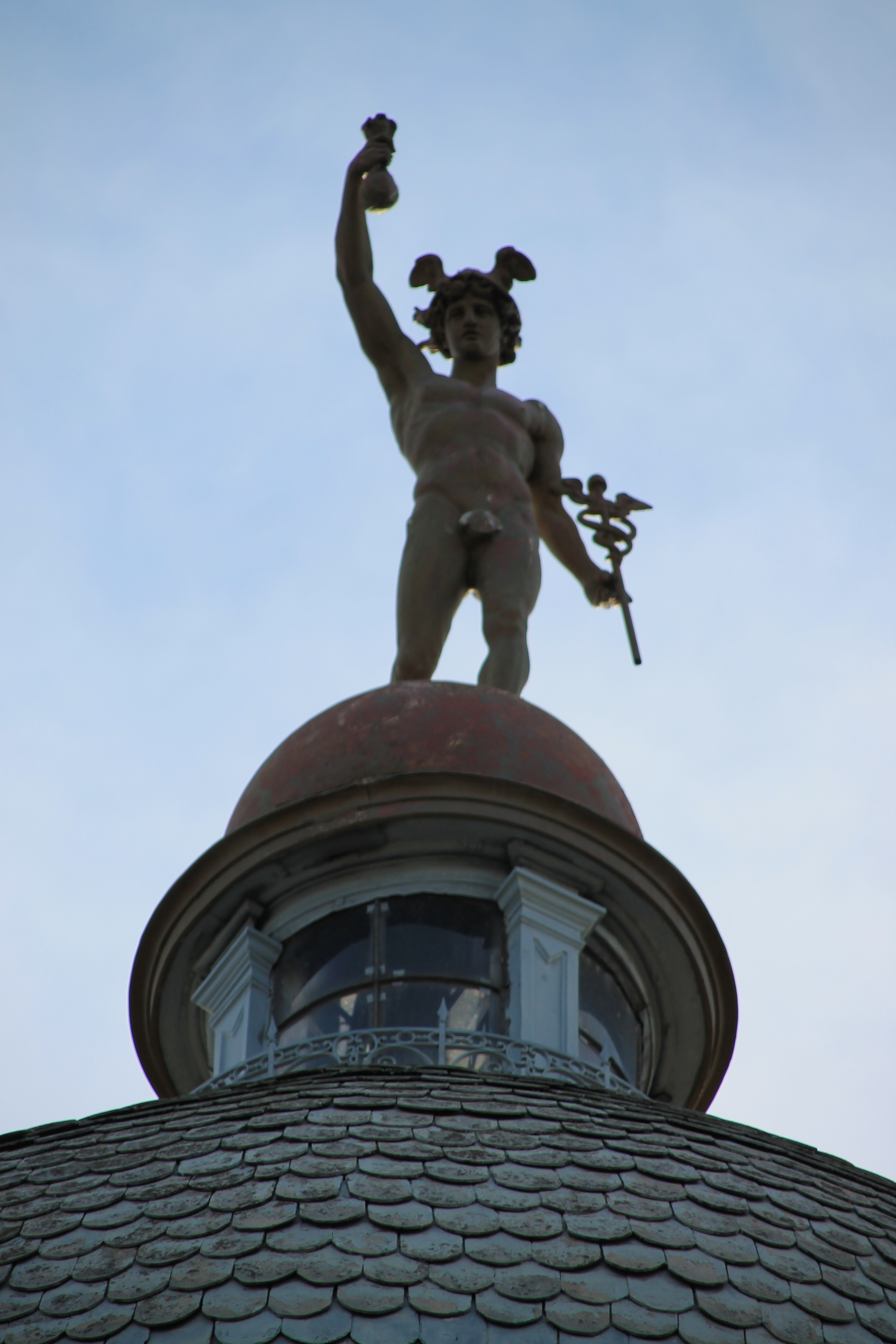
Đorđe Jovanović: A statue of Mercury on top of the Central credits bureau building in Novi Sad, Serbia, 1896

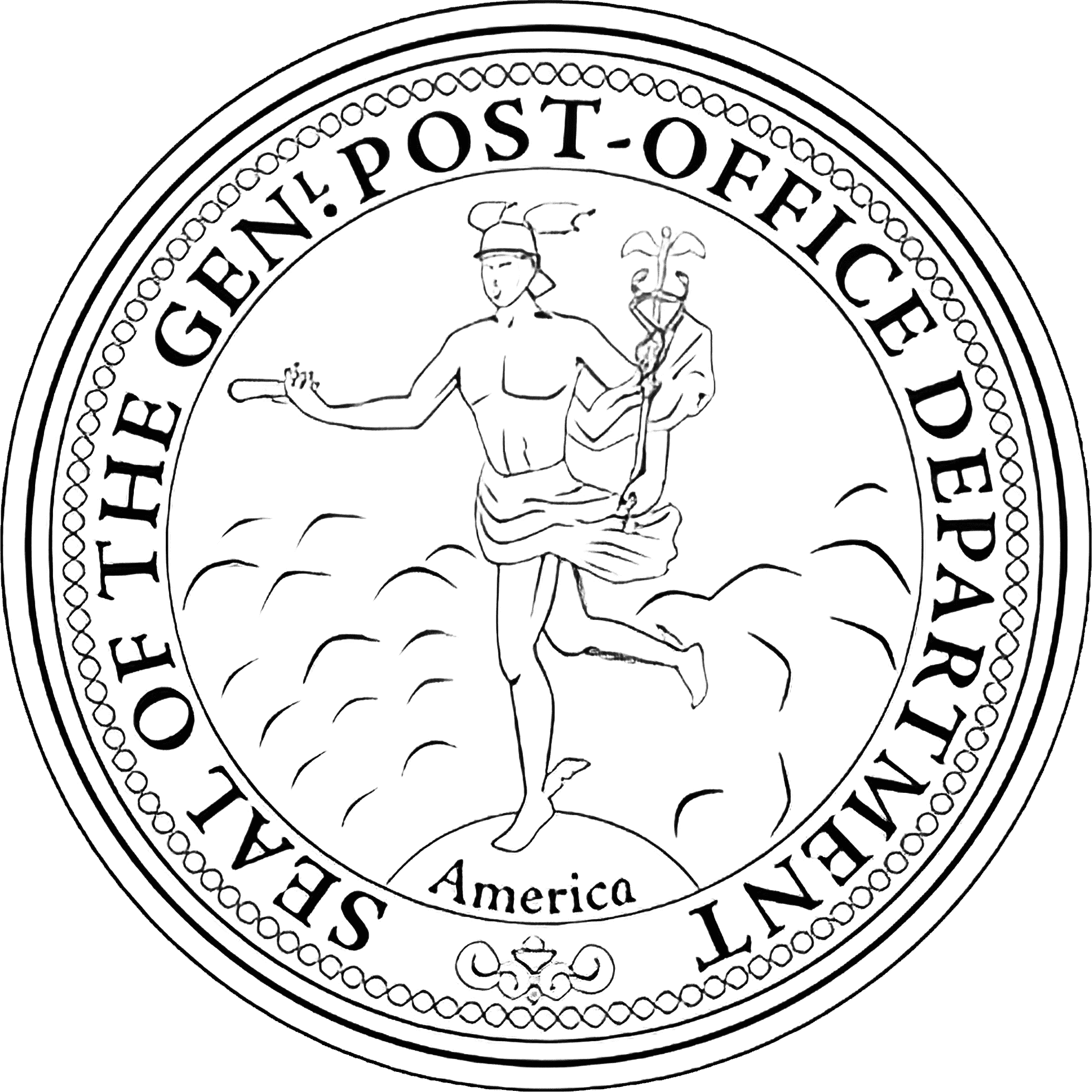
Seal of the United States Post Office Department from 1792 to 1837.

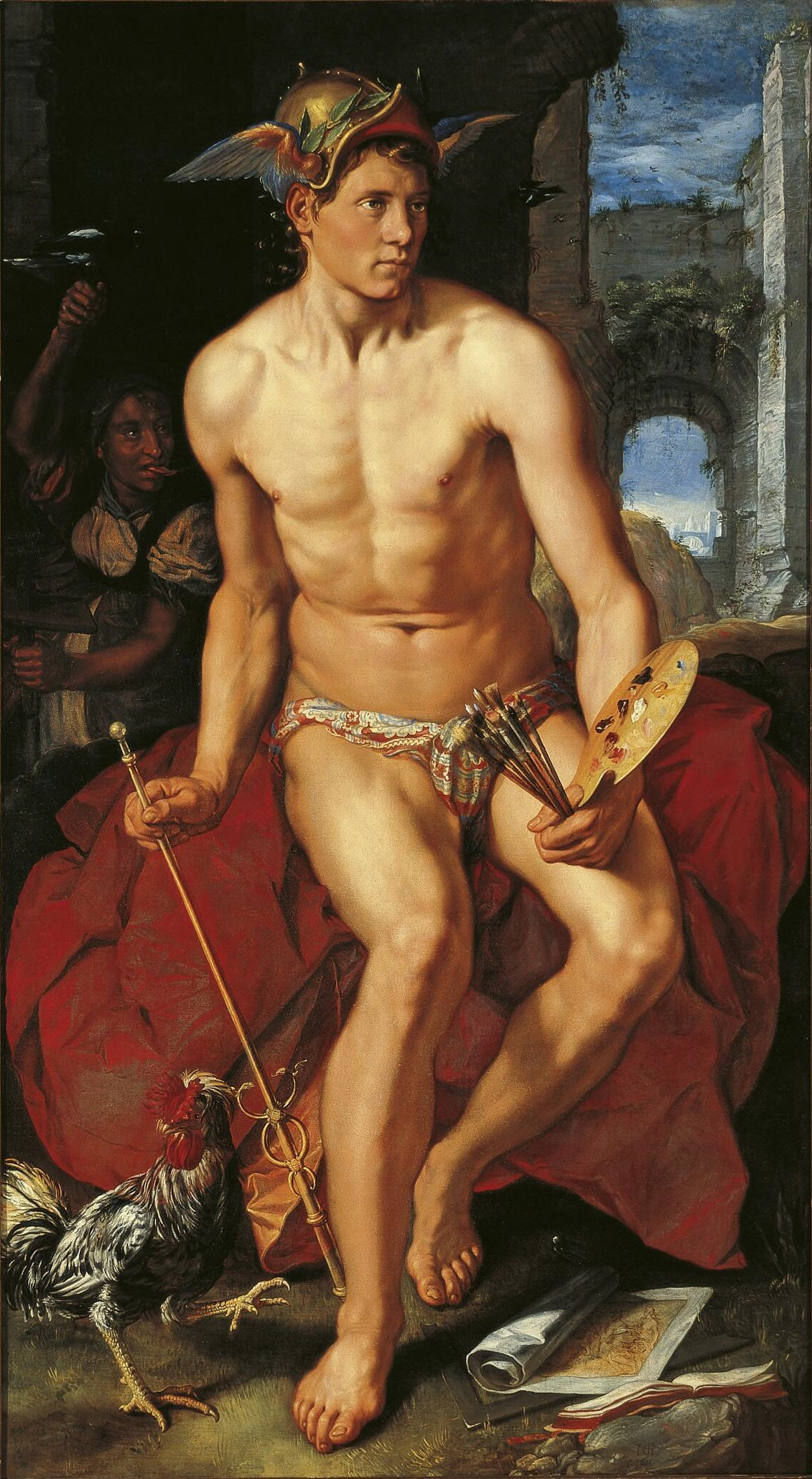
Hendrik Goltzius: Mercury, with his symbols

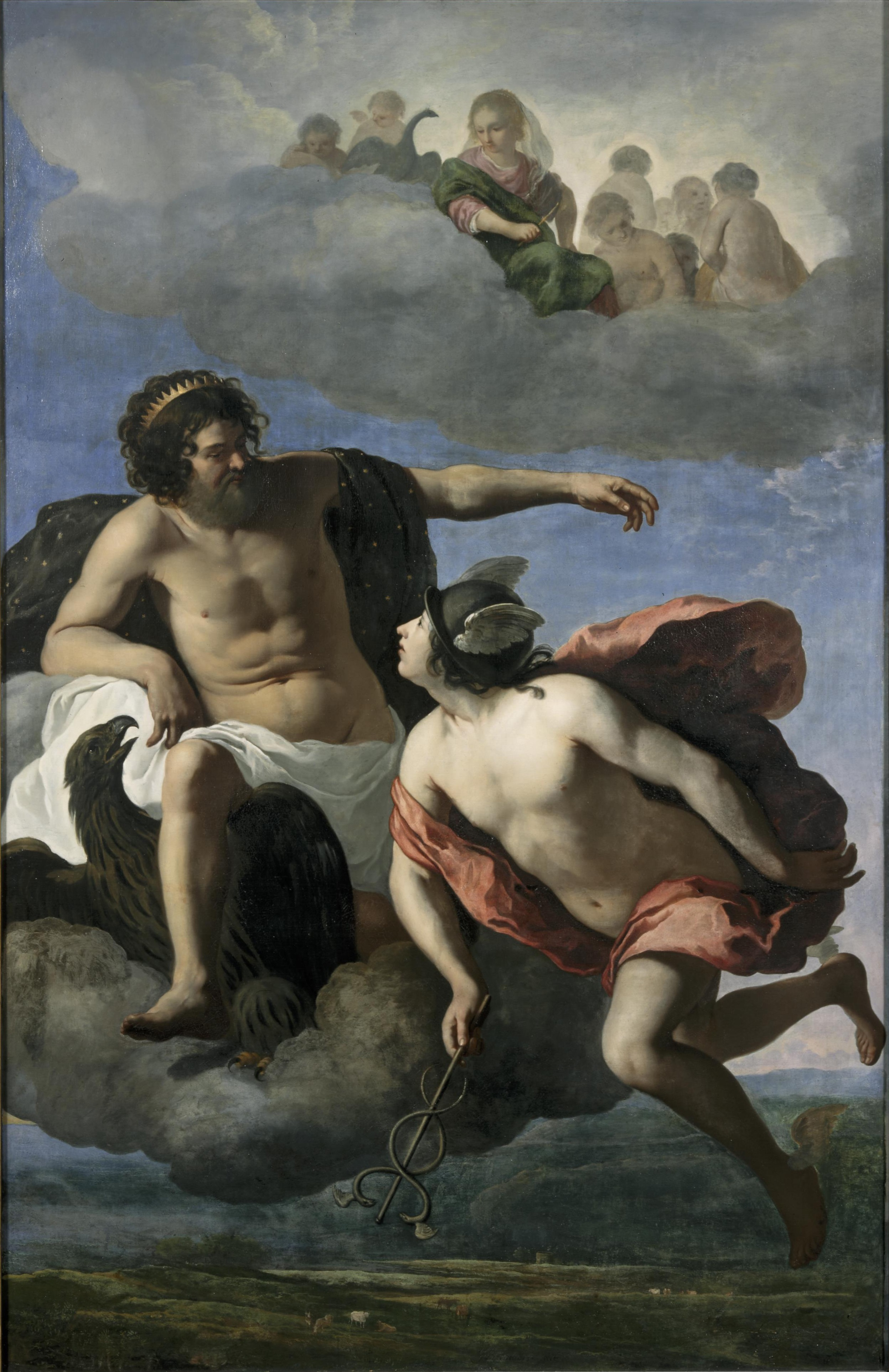
Jan Gerritsz van Bronckhorst: Jupiter Gives Orders to Mercury to Kill Argus

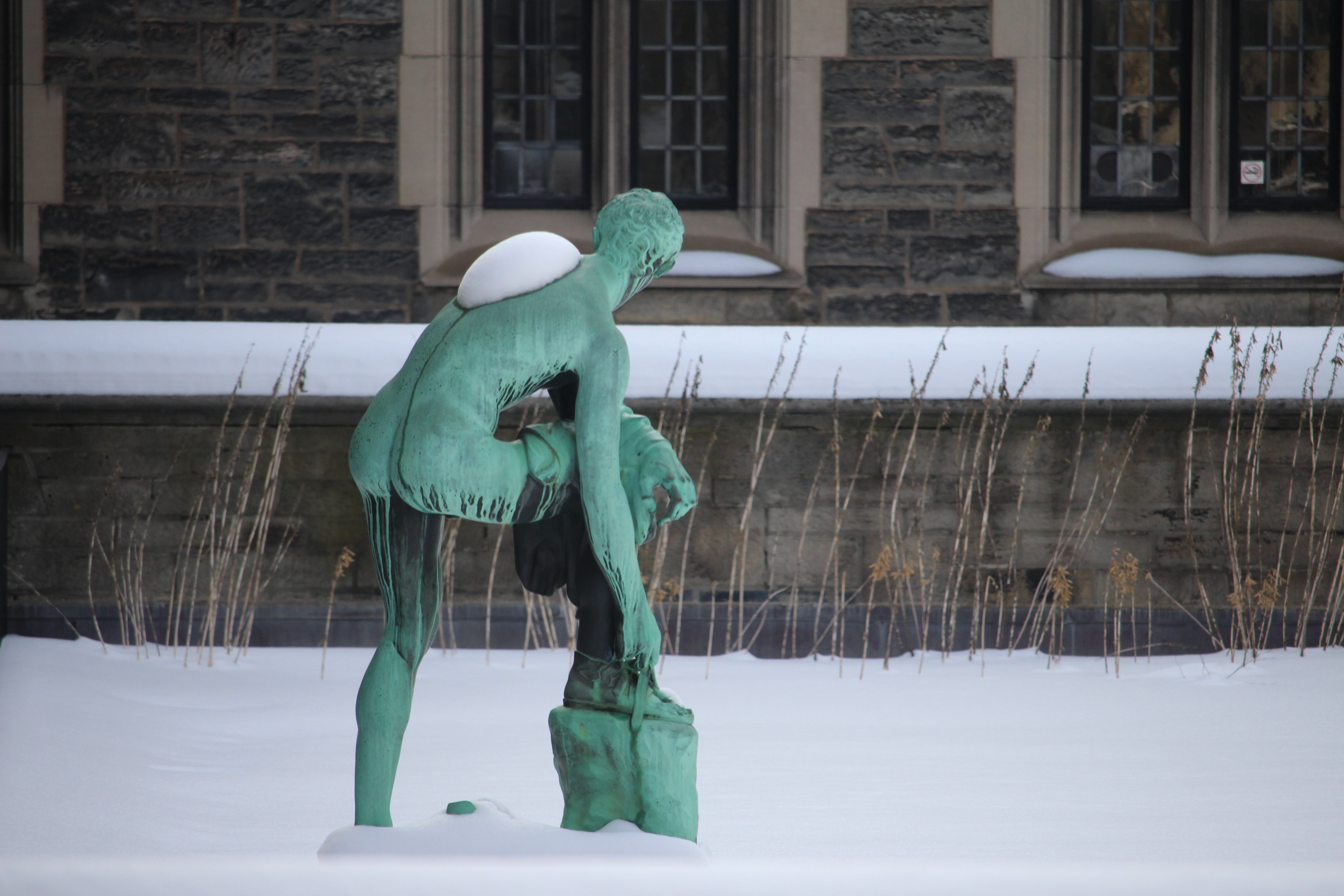
A statue of the Greek god Hermes at Hart House, Toronto

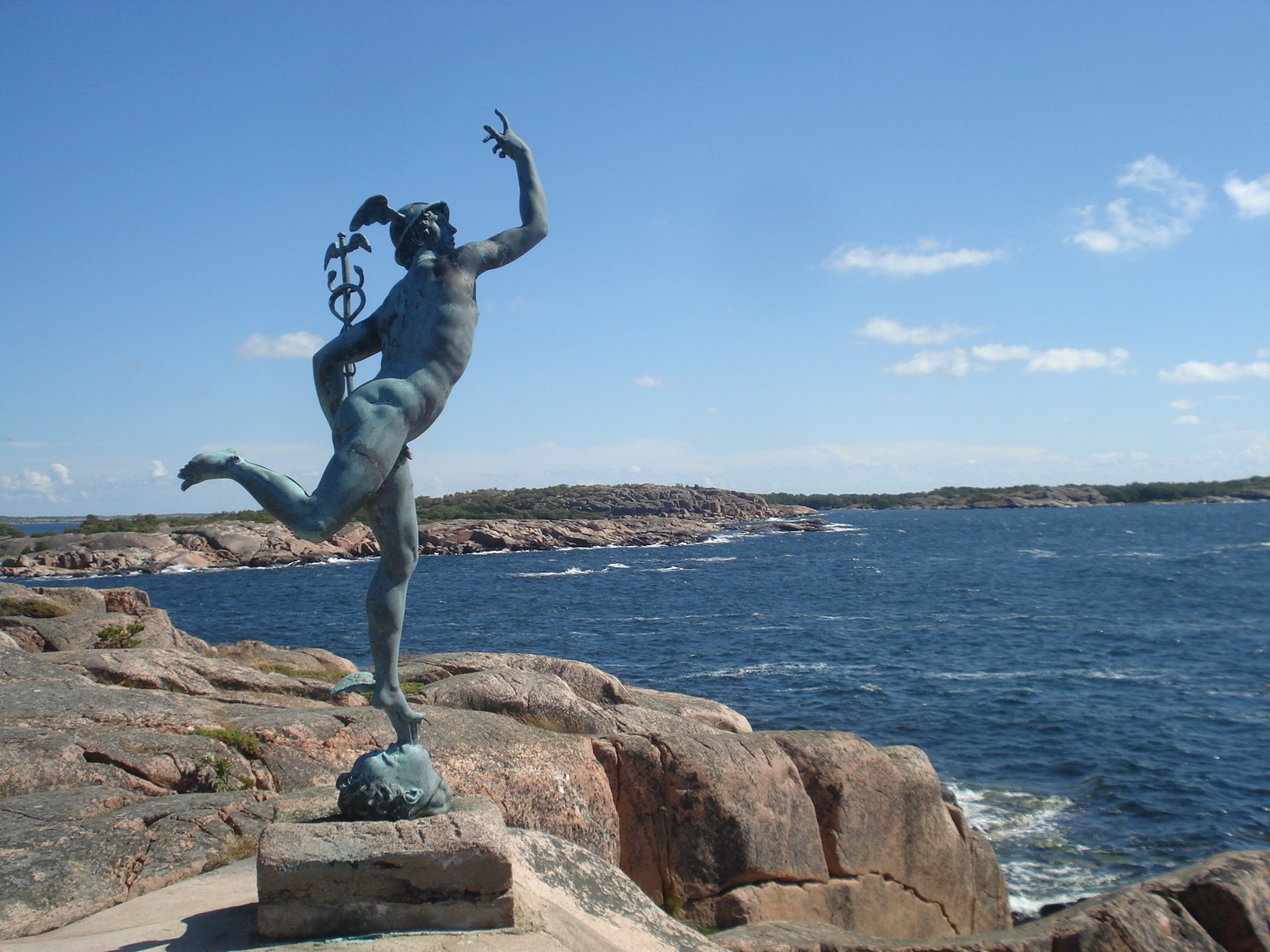
A statue of Mercury on the island of Källskär in Kökar, Åland

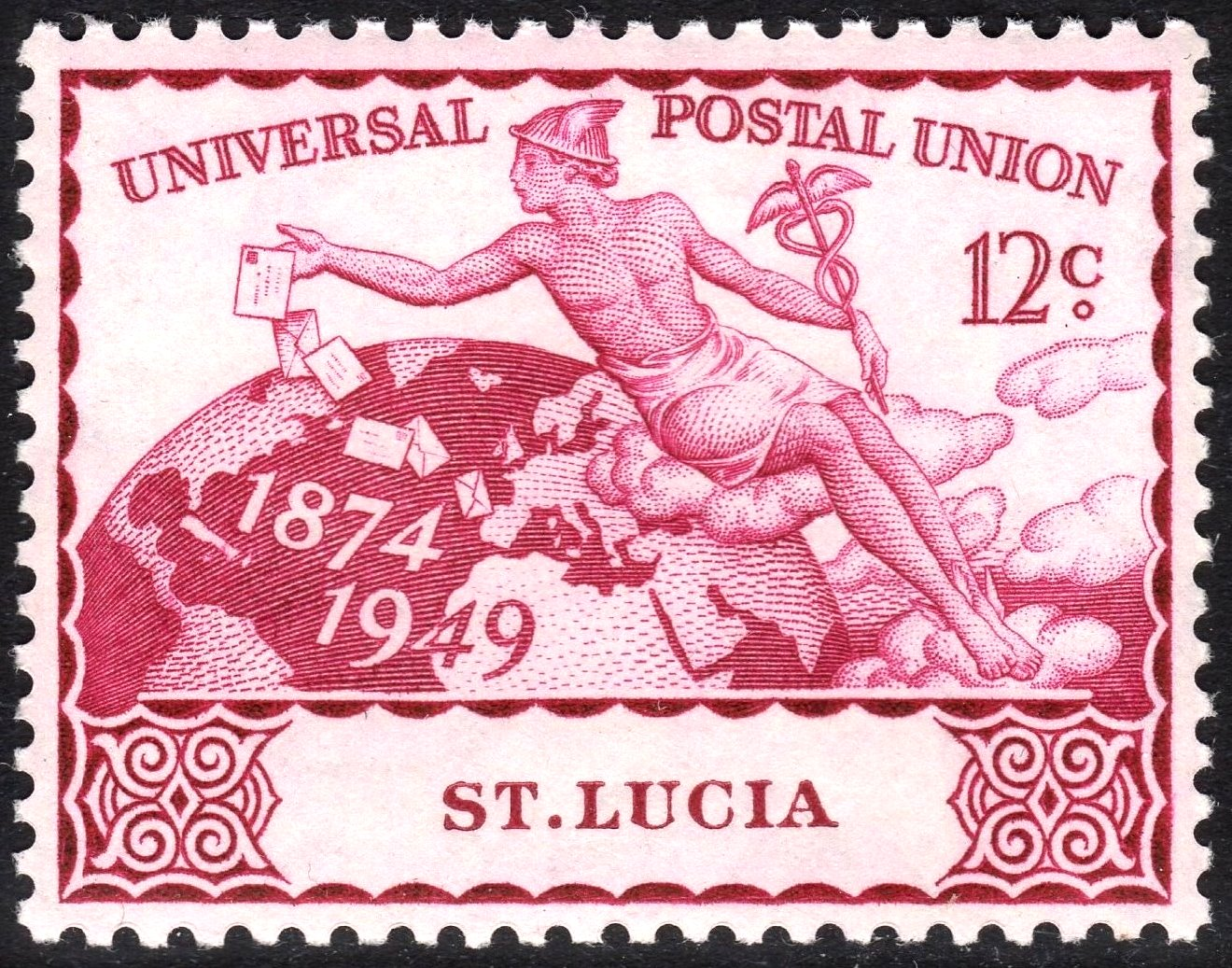
Mercury as the winged messenger on a 1949 Saint Lucia stamp issued in connection with the Universal Postal Union

Alfred Salmon after François Boucher, "Venus Entering Her Bath-Cupid's Lesson," 19th century, engraving
