= Bernhard Maier =

German professor of religious studies (born 1963)

Bernhard Maier (born 1963 in Oberkirch, Baden) is a German professor of religious studies, who publishes mainly on Celtic culture and religion.

Maier studied comparative religion, comparative linguistics, Celtic and Semitic studies at the Albert-Ludwigs-Universität Freiburg, University of Aberystwyth, the Rheinische Friedrich-Wilhelms-Universität Bonn and University of London. He earned his PhD with a doctorate thesis on the Celtic concept of kingship and its Oriental parallels: "König und Göttin. Die keltische Auffassung des Königtums und ihre orientalischen Parallelen".

In 1998 he qualified as a professor at the Rheinische Friedrich-Wilhelms University in Bonn with a habilitation thesis on the religion of the Celts: "Die Religion der Kelten: Götter, Mythen, Weltbild". He was rewarded with the Heisenberg Fellowship of the German Research Foundation (DFG) from 1999 to 2004. From 2004 to 2006 he was Reader and Professor of Celtic at the University of Aberdeen. Since 2006 he has been Professor of religious studies and European history of religion at the University of Tübingen.

== Publications ==
=== Works in English ===
- Kuno Meyer and Wales: letters to John Glyn Davies, 1892-1919, Würzburg, 2017. (Bibliotheca Academica - Geschichte Bd. 8) Original in English.
- Semitic Studies in Victorian Britain. A portrait of William Wright and his world through his letters. Würzburg 2011. Original in English.
- William Robertson Smith. His Life, his Work and his Times. Tübingen 2009. Original in English.
- The Celts: a history from earliest times to the present. Edinburgh 2003. (Translation of Die Kelten: Ihre Geschichte von den Anfängen bis zur Gegenwart)
- Dictionary of Celtic religion and culture. Woodbridge 1997. Translated from the German.

=== Works in German ===
- Die Ordnung des Himmels: eine Geschichte der Religionen von der Steinzeit bis heute, München, 2018.
- Stonehenge: Archäologie, Geschichte, Mythos, 2nd updated and expanded edition, München, 2018.
- Die Kelten: Ihre Geschichte von den Anfängen bis zur Gegenwart, 3rd completely revised and expanded edition, München, 2016.
- Keltologe zwischen Kaiserreich und British Empire: Kuno Meyers Briefe an Korrespondenten in Deutschland und Österreich, 1874-1919, Würzburg, 2016 (Bibliotheca Academica - Geschichte Bd. 6).
- Ein Junge aus Hamburg im viktorianischen Schottland: Kuno Meyers Briefe an die Familie, 1874-1876, Würzburg, 2016. (Bibliotheca Academica - Geschichte Bd. 5).
- Kindheit in der Gründerzeit zwischen Alster und Elbe: Kuno Meyers Tagebücher, 1868-1874, Würzburg, 2016. (Bibliotheca Academica - Geschichte Bd. 4).
- Die Kelten: Geschichte, Kultur und Sprache, Tübingen, 2015. (utb 4354).
- Geschichte Schottlands, München, 2015.
- Gründerzeit der Orientalistik: Theodor Nöldekes Leben und Werk im Spiegel seiner Briefe Würzburg, 2013. (Arbeitsmaterialien zum Orient 29).
- Geschichte und Kultur der Kelten. Also published as Handbuch der Altertumswissenschaft: Geschichte und Kultur der Kelten: Band III,10. München 2012.
- Wörterbuch Schottisch-Gälisch/Deutsch und Deutsch/Schottisch-Gälisch. Hamburg 2011.
- Die Weisheit der Kelten. Sprichwörter aus Irland, Schottland, Wales und der Bretagne. München 2011.
- Die Druiden. München 2009.
- Sternstunden der Religion. Von Augustinus bis Zarathustra. München 2008.
- Stonehenge. Archäologie, Geschichte, Mythos. München 2005.
- Die Religion der Germanen. Götter - Mythen - Weltbild. München 2003.
- Kleines Lexikon der Namen und Wörter keltischen Ursprungs. München 2003.
- Die Religion der Kelten. Götter - Mythen - Weltbild. München 2001.
- Koran-Lexikon. Stuttgart 2001.
- Die Kelten. Ihre Geschichte von den Anfängen bis zur Gegenwart. München 2000.
- Das Sagenbuch der walisischen Kelten. Die vier Zweige des Mabinogi. München 1999.
- Lexikon der keltischen Religion und Kultur. Stuttgart 1994.

=== Works in Japanese ===
- ケルト事典 (Keruto Jiten, i.e. "Celtic Dictionary"), Osaka 2001. Translated from the German.
