= Arubianus =

Arubianus or Arubinus was a Celtic god of the inscriptions in Southern Germany, and in Austria and Slovenia.

== Mythology and Etymology ==
The name is Celtic for "tiller" or "God of the plowed field". Sometimes it is also used for the local god of the Roman-Celtic settlement Arrubium (Măcin, Romania held), his followers would have spread his religious practices in other areas. The name may be analogous with Arawn.

In the Gallo-Roman period Arubianus was identified with the god Jupiter, so it is perhaps a sky god or father of the gods. On the other hand, Jupiter was regarded as a protective god of the Roman settlements, so that can also apply to a local deity.

== See also ==
- Celtic polytheism
- Celtic Mythology

== Literature ==
- August Friedrich von Pauly / Wissowa Georg : Pauly's Real-encyclopedia of classical archeology. Georg von Holtzbrinck Publishing Group, 1919.
- Franz Franziss: Bavaria time of the Romans: A historical-archaeological research. Friedrich Pustet, in 1905.
- Ekkehard Weber: The Roman period inscriptions Styria published by the State Historical Commission, 1969.
- Johann Wilhelm C. Steiner: Codex inscriptionum romanarum Danubii et Rheni. No. 2754.
