= Clṻd =

Celtic goddess

In Celtic mythology, Clṻd /klɨːd/ or Clọ:tā /klɔːtaː/ (Latin: Clōta) is a hypothesised/inferred Brittonic goddess of the River Clyde. If she was ever revered historically, she would presumably have been worshipped by the Damnonii tribe who held the territory around the Clyde basin which later was to become the Kingdom of Alt Clud (possibly Alclṻd, and later the Kingdom of Strathclyde (Ystrad Clud)), at least prior to the Christianisation of Roman Britain and possibly later.

Alt Clud had its base of power at Dumbarton Rock ("Alt Clud"), and later moved to Govan, both in immediate proximity to the Clyde. Alt Clud is known to have been in use since the Iron Age and therefore was also likely a prominent site for the Damnonii.

The name "Clṻd" is the reconstructed Brittonic form of the river name "Clyde" - which developed into "Clut" and/or "Clud" in Cumbric (a descendant of Brittonic that was spoken in Yr Hen Ogledd in the early medieval period – contemporary to Old Welsh), and "Chluaidh" in Gaelic, before reaching its current English form. James (2019) provides "Clṻd" meaning "pure, cleansed" for the river and "Clọ:tā" meaning "she who is pure" as a potential form for the goddess' name.

There is little if any direct evidence for the existence or worship of this deity, or the precise form of her name. In 1967 a tricephalic Celtic statue was found close to the Clyde and in the vicinity of the source of one of its minor tibutaries, and Ross (1974) interprets this as very likely to depict a god or gods (perhaps connected to the goddess of the river) in line with similar sculptures found elsewhere, which demonstrates likely Celtic worship of water-based deities in the area and time period.

Sir John Rhŷs (1891) points to the existence of the minor character Gwawl ap Clud in the first cycle of the Mabinogi, who is the initially betrothed of Rhiannon (reasonably herself interpreted as a divine figure). And proposes that this mythological figure (whom he connects to some form of solar divinity) should be read as the son of the goddess Clud (though typically Early/Pre-Medieval surnames were patronymic, there are cases - especially in myth such as the Mabinogi - where matronymic names are known (e.g. Gouannon mab Dôn and Amaethon mab Dôn in Culhwch and Olwen, both notably sons of the goddess Dôn)). This relationship is supported by MacKillop (2004), though whether the goddess "Clud" mentioned is related to the Clyde is not mentioned.

However, there is broad agreement that divine embodiments of natural bodies of water (e.g. springs, rivers, lakes) were very common in Celtic culture, to the point that it could be considered the norm for every such feature in an inhabited region to have an associated god or spirit (overwhelmingly female). As such, several authors conjecture the existence of this goddess based solely or primarily on the significance of the River Clyde and that its region was populated in the British Iron Age, generally presuming based on the etymology of the river name that she is a goddess associated with the concepts of purity, cleanliness, and/or washing.
