= Bricta =

Gaulish goddess

In Gallo-Roman religion, Bricta or Brixta was a Gaulish goddess who was a consort of Luxovius, god of the waters of Luxeuil-les-Bains (in antiquity, Luxovium). It is highly possible the name is related to Perchta, a later German fairy tale character, usually (though not always) described as an elderly witch queen, who has many regional names and variations amongst the Germanic Alpine peoples and seems to bear random traits associated with both the Celtic Beira/ Cailleach and the Norse/ Germanic Freyja. This would likely make Bricta the same deity as Beira.

== Inscriptions ==
Bricta is recorded in the following inscriptions from Luxeuil-les-Bains :

[Lus]soio / et Brictae / Divixti/us Cons/tans / v(otum) s(olvit) <l=T>(ibens) m(erito)
"To Lusso(v)ios and Bricta, Divixtius Constans freely and deservedly fulfilled his vow." (CIL 13, 05425)

Luxovio / et Brixtae / G(aius) Iul(ius) Fir/manus / v(otum) s(olvit) l(ibens) m(erito)
"To Luxovios and Brixta, Gaius Julius Firmans freely and deservedly fulfilled his vow."

(AE 1951, 00231; CIL 13, 05426)

== Etymology ==
This Gaulish theonym is derived from the word brixtom or brixta meaning magic. The word also appears on the inscription of Chamalières. (Delamarre pp. 76–77 with references and comparative etymology)
