= Niskus =

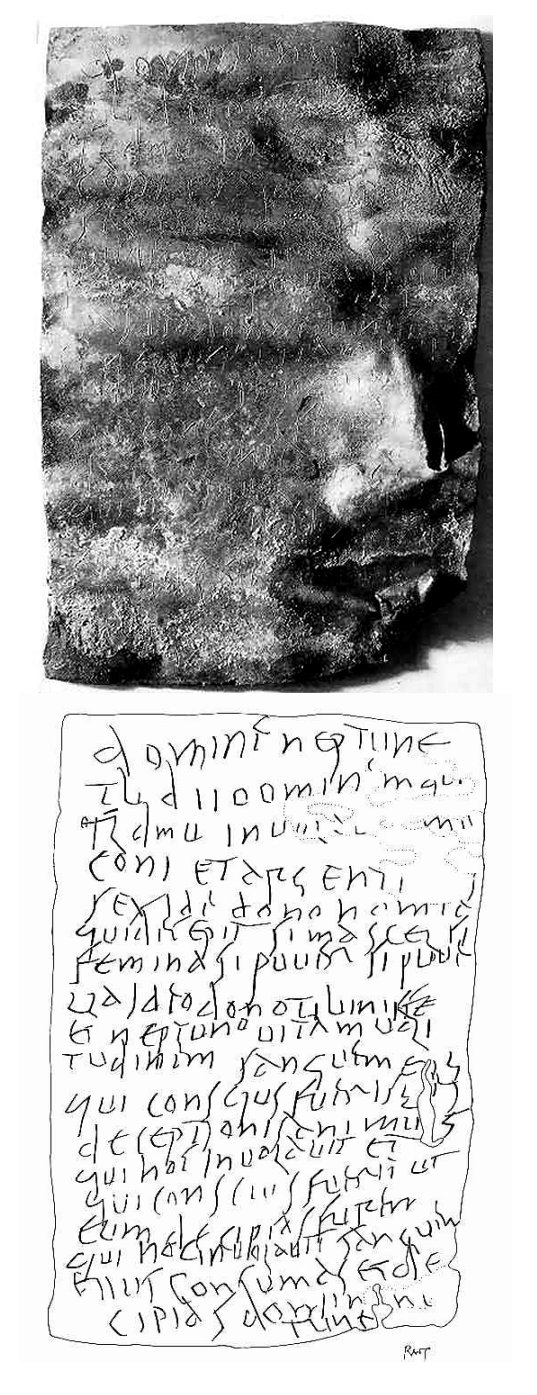
Hamble tablet

Niskus is a Romano-British river god, mentioned one time from a lead curse tablet inscription. Found on Creek Badnam in Southampton in 1982, this curse tablet from the Greco-Roman world was created in about 350 or 400 AD by Muconius, a man angry at the mystery thief who stole his gold and silver coins.

Latin Text: Latin: Domine Neptune / t(i)b(i) d(o)no (h)ominem qui / | (solidum) involav[it] Mu/coni et argent[olo]s / sex ide(o) dono nomi(n)a / qui decepit si mascel si / femina si pu{u}er si pu{u}e/lla ideo dono tibi Niske(!) / et Neptuno vitam vali/tudinem sangu(in)em eius / qui conscius fueri eius / deceptionis animu qui hoc involavit et / qui conscius fuerit ut / eum decipias furem / qui hoc involavit sangu(in)em / ei{i}us consumas et de/cipias domin[e] Ne[p]/tune

Translation: Lord Neptune, I give you the man who has stolen the solidus and six argentioli of Muconius. So I give the names who took them away, whether male or female, whether boy or girl. So I give you, Niskus, and to Neptune the life, health, blood of him who has been privy to that taking-away. The mind which stole this and which has been privy to it, may you take it away. The thief who stole this, may you consume his blood and take it away, Lord Neptune.

T. Mikhailova's "British and Roman Names from the Sulis -Minerva Temple: Two Solutions to an Old Problem" (31–46) represents the name of god Niskus from the lead curse tablet.

== Sources ==
- Roman Inscriptions of Britain Online
- A Corpus of Writing-Tablets from Roman Britain
- Curse Tablets from Roman Britain
- Lexicon of the Worlds of the Celtic Gods
