= Achtland =

In Irish mythology, Queen Achtland married one of the Tuatha Dé Danann who were the people of the goddess Danu.

Achtland herself was a mortal woman, and as an adult she was infamous for her displeasure in what she found available to her among human men. It is said that no man could ever satisfy her, but when she was approached by one of the Tuatha Dé Danann, her heart was smitten with him.

She married this man of the Tuatha Dé Danann, and became immortal by crossing over into the land of the síde to be his wife. It is said that she found great delight in brushing his long silken hair.

== Etymology ==
This name appears to be derived from Proto-Celtic *Hek-to-landā. The name literally means "cattle-adorned pasture." (cf. ). The Romano-British form of this Proto-Celtic theonym is likely to have been *Hectolanda (cf. ).
