= Tridamus =

Tridamus is the name of a deity attested from a single inscription on a sandstone altar from Roman Britain, found in Michaelchurch in present-day Herefordshire. The inscription reads:

DEO TRIDAM(...)
BELLICVS DON
AVIT ARA[M]

'To the god Tridam(us), Bellicus gave (this) altar'

However, alternative readings of the rough-hewn inscription also exist, some of which have read Triv or Trivii for Tridam(us). The altar remains in St Michael's Church in Michaelchurch.

The name Tridamus may be derived from the Proto-Celtic *tri-damos meaning 'three-bovine one'.

== Sources ==
- British Museum, London, England
- Lancaster museum, Lancaster, England
- Newcastle Museum of Antiquities, Newcastle, England
- Penrith Museum, Penrith, England
- Verovicium Roman Museum, Housesteads Fort, Northumberland, England
- York Castle Museum, York, England
