= Viévy =

- Commune
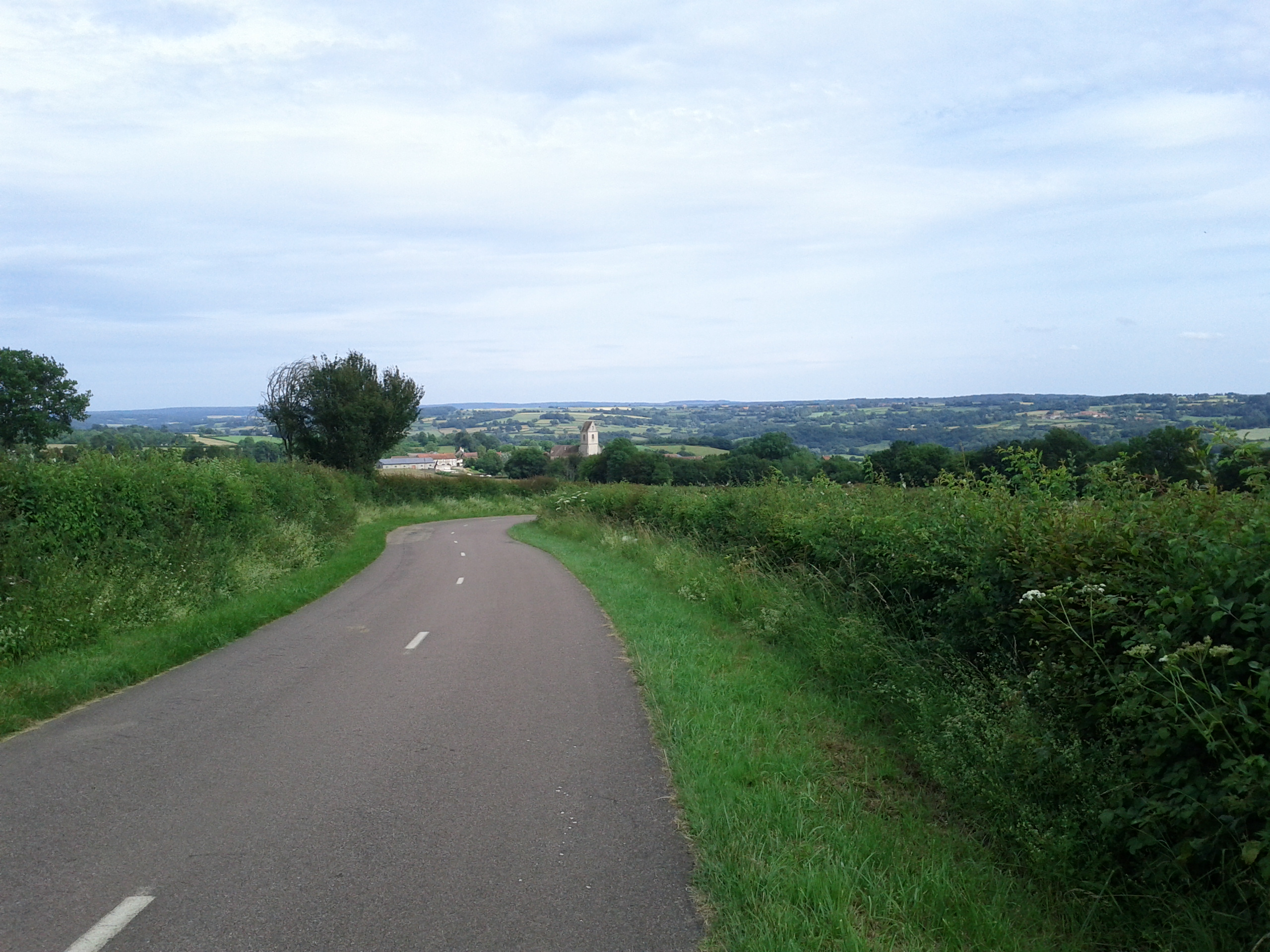
- Landscape and road in Viévy

- Coat of arms
- Location of Viévy
- Location within France Location within Bourgogne-Franche-Comté
- Coordinates: 47°03′29″N 4°27′11″E
- Country: France
- Region: Bourgogne-Franche-Comté
- Department: Côte-d'Or
- Arrondissement: Beaune
- Canton: Arnay-le-Duc
- Intercommunality: Pays Arnay Liernais

Government
  - Mayor (2020–2026): Alain Guiniot-Delaroux
- Area^{1}: 32.88 km^{2} (12.70 sq mi)
- Highest elevation: 435 m (1,427 ft)
- Lowest elevation: 316 m (1,037 ft)
- Population (2023): 364
  - Density: 11.1/km^{2} (28.7/sq mi)
- Time zone: UTC+01:00 (CET)
  - Summer (DST): UTC+02:00 (CEST)
- INSEE/Postal code: 21683 /21230
- ^{1} French Land Register data, which excludes lakes, ponds, glaciers > 1 km^{2} (0.386 sq mi or 247 acres) and river estuaries.

Viévy (French pronunciation: [vjevi]) is a commune in the Côte-d'Or department in eastern France.

== Population ==
Historical population
Year	Pop.	±% p.a.
1968	582	—
1975	483	−2.63%
1982	443	−1.23%
1990	352	−2.83%
1999	347	−0.16%
2007	364	+0.60%
2012	343	−1.18%
2017	357	+0.80%
2023	364	+0.32%
Source: INSEE

== See also ==
- Communes of the Côte-d'Or department
