= Visucius =

Ancient Celtic god

Visucius was an ancient Celtic god worshipped in the Roman provinces of Gaul and Upper Germany. He is attested only in inscriptions, in which he appears chiefly as a byname of the Roman Mercury under the interpretatio romana, most often as Mercurius Visucius, though at one site he is named on his own. A goddess bearing the matching name Visucia appears alongside him and with him forms a divine couple. His dedications are concentrated in Germania Superior, with a smaller group among the Treveri and Mediomatrici in Gallia Belgica and an outlier at Burdigala in Aquitania.

== Name ==
Visucius is known only from Latin votive inscriptions and does not appear in classical literature. The name occurs in the dative, Visucio, most often paired with that of Mercury. At one site the god is named on his own, without Mercury, and a goddess with the matching name Visucia is attested beside him.

The name is Gaulish, but its meaning is uncertain. One interpretation takes the name to mean 'the knowing one'. Such a reading would rest on a Gaulish stem uis(s)u- ('knowledge'), which recurs in personal names such as Uisu-lanius ('filled with knowledge') and Uis-marus ('great in knowledge'). The element is ambiguous, however. As Xavier Delamarre notes, the initial Uisu- may represent either uis(s)u- ('knowledge') or uesu- ('good'), and names like Uisu-rix can be interpreted as either 'wise king' or 'worthy king'. A different view interprets the stem uisuco- as 'raven', Rudolf Thurneysen comparing it with Old Irish fiach ('raven'), which Delamarre mentions with doubts. (Note: Thurneysen's comparison raises phonological difficulties. Joseph Vendryes derived the Irish fiach from Proto-Celtic *wesākos ('voracious'), itself from an Indo-European root *wes- ('to gorge, feed'). Ranko Matasović likewise derives it, along with Middle Welsh gwyach ('grebe'), from Proto-Celtic *wesāk(k)o- ('raven' or 'grebe') which he takes to be a loan from an unknown non-Indo-European language.)

== Cult ==
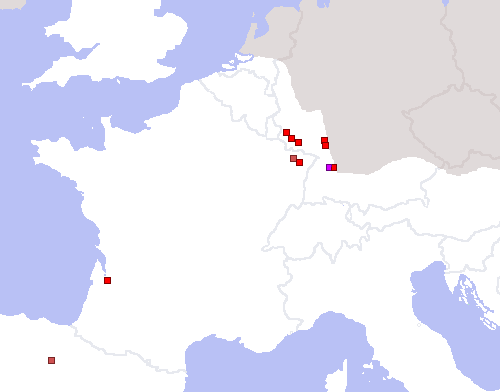
Map showing the distribution of inscriptions to Visucius.

Visucius is attested at a small number of sites in the Rhineland and eastern Gaul. His dedications are most numerous in Germania Superior, with a further group among the Treveri and Mediomatrici in Gallia Belgica and a single outlier far to the south-west at Burdigala. Bernhard Maier counts seven inscriptions in all, one at Burdigala, three among the Treveri and Mediomatrici, and three in Germania Superior.

Mercury Visucius is associated with a goddess Visucia in a dedication from Grinario in Germania Superior, reading deo Mercurio Visucio et Sanctae Visuciae ('to the god Mercury Visucius and to the holy Visucia'). The goddess Visucia is also named alone at Augusta Treverorum. (Note: Some modern scholars attach Visucius to Mars rather than Mercury. De Vries and Duval name the divine couple 'Mars Visucius and Visucia', and Aldhouse-Green follows them, while James MacKillop lists Visucius among the bynames of both gods. No dedication to Mars survives: the only inscription naming the pair, CIL XIII, 6384 from Grinario, reads deo Mercurio Visucio et Sanctae Visuciae, and Maier rightly gives the couple as Mercurius Visucius and Visucia.) The two form a divine couple of a kind common in Gaul and the German provinces, in which the god takes a Roman name while the goddess keeps her native one.

== Interpretation ==
Visucius is commonly understood as a native byname of the Gaulish Mercury, one of the many such epithets that the god carried in Gaul and the German provinces. These native bynames are generally taken to be the names of local gods absorbed under the Roman one. Because Visucius is sometimes named on his own and sometimes as a byname of a Roman god, the surviving evidence is ambiguous as to whether he was an autonomous figure or merely a local by-form of Mercury.

Based on the reading of the name as 'the knowing one', Raffaele Pettazzoni argued that the god was an all-knowing solar deity, a conclusion Jan de Vries rejected.

== Epigraphy ==
Visucius is named in a small group of Latin votive inscriptions from Gaul, the German provinces and, once, Hispania. In most he is invoked as Mercury Visucius, at Grinario together with the goddess Visucia, and at Heidelberg on his own.

| Text | Find-spot | Divine name(s) | Translation | Reference | Comments |
|---|---|---|---|---|---|
| Merc(urio) Aug(usto) Visucio Iul(ius) Montanus T(iti) Iul(i) Secundi Fausti lib(ertus) v(otum) s(olvit) l(ibens) m(erito) | Burdigala, Aquitania | Mercurius Augustus Visucius | To Mercury Augustus Visucius, Iulius Montanus, freedman of Titus Iulius Secundus Faustus, fulfilled his vow willingly and deservedly. | CIL XIII, 577 | The southern outlier of the cult, dedicated by a freedman. |
| [Mer]curio [Visu]cio [...]us [...]nalis [v(otum) s(olvit)] l(ibens) [m(erito)] | Augusta Treverorum, Gallia Belgica (Treveri) | Mercurius Visucius | To Mercury Visucius, [...]us [...]nalis fulfilled his vow willingly and deservedly. | CIL XIII, 3660 | Fragmentary. |
| D(e)ae V[isuc]iae [...] | Augusta Treverorum, Gallia Belgica (Treveri) | Visucia | To the goddess Visucia ... | CIL XIII, 3665 | Names the goddess Visucia on her own. |
| [In h(onorem)] d(omus) d(ivinae) [... Vi]sucio [... Ac]ceptus [...] Mottio [v(otum) s(olverunt)] l(ibentes) m(erito) | Tholey, Gallia Belgica (Treveri) | [Mercurius] Visucius | In honour of the divine house, to [Mercury] Visucius, [Ac]ceptus and Mottio fulfilled their vow willingly and deservedly. | CIL XIII, 4257 | Fragmentary. |
| [In h(onorem)] d(omus) d(ivinae) [...]visuclo | Herapel, Gallia Belgica (Mediomatrici) | Visucius | In honour of the divine house, to Visucius ... | CIL XIII, 4478 | Fragmentary. The surviving letters read visuclo. |
| I(ovi) O(ptimo) M(aximo) Apol[lini] et Visu[cio] Soli T[...] | Tabernae, Germania Superior | Iuppiter Optimus Maximus, Apollo, Visucius, Sol | To Jupiter Best and Greatest, to Apollo, and to Visucius, to Sol ... | CIL XIII, 5991 | Fragmentary. Here Visucius is grouped with Jupiter, Apollo and Sol, and is not linked with Mercury. |
| Visucio Mercurio Senilis Masse v(otum) s(olvit) l(ibens) l(aetus) m(erito) | Hockenheim, Germania Superior | Visucius Mercurius | To Visucius Mercury, Senilis Masse fulfilled his vow willingly, gladly and deservedly. | CIL XIII, 6347 | The native name precedes the Roman one. |
| Deo Mercurio Visucio et Sa(n)ct(a)e Visuci(a)e P(ublius) Quartionius Secundinus decu(rio) [c]ivi(tatis) Sumel(ocennensis) ex iu(ssu) v(otum) s(olvit) l(ibens) m(erito) | Grinario, Germania Superior | Mercurius Visucius and Visucia | To the god Mercury Visucius and to the holy Visucia, Publius Quartionius Secundinus, councillor of the civitas of Sumelocenna, fulfilled his vow willingly and deservedly at (the god's) bidding. | CIL XIII, 6384 | The only dedication naming the divine couple together. |
| Visucio aedem cum signo C(aius) Candidius Calpurnianus d(ecurio) c(ivium) c(ivitatis) S(ueborum) N(icretum) item dec(urio) [c(ivium)] c(ivitatis) Nemet(um) fec(it) | Heidelberg, Germania Superior | Visucius | To Visucius, Gaius Candidius Calpurnianus, councillor of the community of the civitas of the Suebi Nicretes and likewise councillor of that of the Nemetes, built a temple with a statue. | CIL XIII, 6404 | Visucius is named on his own, without Mercury. The dedicant built a temple (aedem) with a cult image (signo) for the god. |
| [Mercurio] Visuceo votun(!) [s(olvit)] libe(n)s | Barbariana (Agoncillo), Hispania citerior | Mercurius Visuceus | To [Mercury] Visuceus, (he) paid his vow willingly. | AE 1976, 327 | A far outlier in Hispania. The name appears in the variant form Visuceus, and votun stands for votum. Not treated in the standard accounts of the god. |

== Bibliography ==
- Aldhouse-Green, Miranda (1986). The Gods of the Celts. Gloucester: Alan Sutton. ISBN 0-86299-292-3.
- Aldhouse-Green, Miranda (1997). Dictionary of Celtic Myth and Legend. London: Thames & Hudson.
- Delamarre, Xavier (2003). Dictionnaire de la langue gauloise: Une approche linguistique du vieux-celtique continental. Paris: Errance. ISBN 9782877723695.
- de Vries, Jan (1961). Keltische Religion. Die Religionen der Menschheit. Vol. 18. Stuttgart: W. Kohlhammer.
- Duval, Paul-Marie (1976). Les Dieux de la Gaule. Paris: Payot.
- MacKillop, James (1998). A Dictionary of Celtic Mythology. Oxford: Oxford University Press. ISBN 0-19-869157-2.
- Maier, Bernhard (1997). Dictionary of Celtic Religion and Culture. Translated by Edwards, Cyril. Woodbridge: The Boydell Press. ISBN 0-85115-698-3.
- Maier, Bernhard (2001). Die Religion der Kelten: Götter, Mythen, Weltbild. München: C. H. Beck. ISBN 3-406-48234-1.
- Matasović, Ranko (2009). Etymological Dictionary of Proto-Celtic. Leiden Indo-European Etymological Dictionary Series. Vol. 9. Leiden: Brill. ISBN 978-90-04-17336-1.
