= Valéry Raydon =

French historian and mythologist (born 1973)

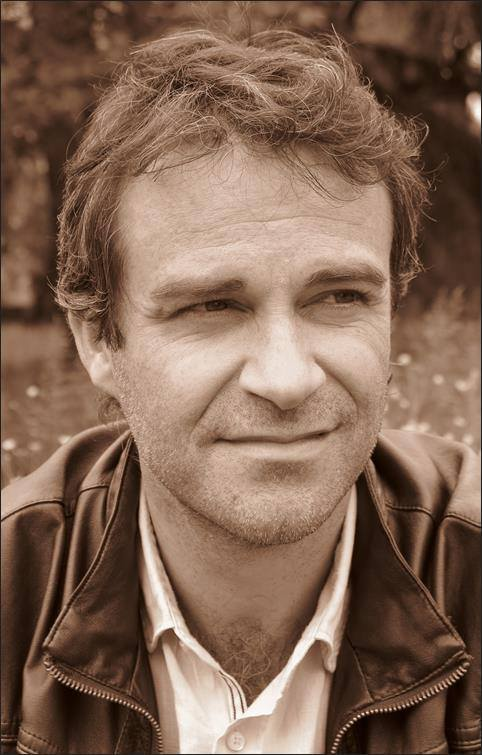
- Born: 25 February 1973 (age 53); Nîmes, France
- Occupations: Historian, mythologist, writer

Academic background
- Thesis: La richesse chez Hérodote (2003)
- Influences: Georges Dumézil

Academic work
- Discipline: Comparative mythology, Celtic studies

Valéry Raydon (born 25 February 1973) is a French historian and mythologist. An independent researcher with a doctorate in ancient history, he studies Celtic and Indo-European mythology by the methods of comparative mythology, in the tradition associated with Georges Dumézil. He has written mainly on Gaulish religion, insular Celtic myth and the Celtic background of Arthurian legend.

== Life and career ==
Raydon was born in Nîmes on 25 February 1973. He holds a doctorate in ancient history. His thesis, La richesse chez Hérodote ('Wealth in Herodotus'), supervised by Pierre Villard, was published in 2003.

Raydon has edited, with André-Yves Bourgès, the collective volume Hagiographie bretonne et mythologie celtique (2016).

He is also a Scottish-bagpipe player and songwriter, active in the groups Kaïna and The Celtic Travellers.

== Work ==
Raydon applies the structural and trifunctional comparative method of Georges Dumézil to Celtic material, reading the insular (Irish and Welsh) and continental (Gaulish) traditions against one another. His books include Le mythe de la Crau (2013), on a Celtic religious tradition attached to the Crau plain, Héritages indo-européens dans la Rome républicaine (2014), prefaced by Dominique Briquel, Le chaudron du Dagda (2015), prefaced by Claude Sterckx, and Le cortège du Graal (2019), which argues that the grail procession in Chrétien de Troyes derives from an insular Celtic and ultimately Indo-European model.

=== Reception ===
Reviewing Le mythe de la Crau in Études Celtiques, the Celticist Pierre-Yves Lambert found several of its analyses fairly convincing while noting the limits of a strictly Dumézilian reading of the Irish sources. Le cortège du Graal was reviewed favourably by Guillaume Oudaer in Nouvelle Mythologie Comparée, but the medievalist Philippe Walter, writing in Iris, rejected its reading of the grail scene in Chrétien de Troyes as reductive.

== Selected publications ==
- Apologie du dieu Kronos: du souverain prêtre au bienveillant boiteux. Paris: Le Labyrinthe, 2007.
- Le mythe de la Crau: archéologie d'une pensée religieuse celtique (preface by Marco V. García Quintela). Marseille: Terre de Promesse, 2013.
- Héritages indo-européens dans la Rome républicaine (preface by Dominique Briquel). Avion: Éditions du Cénacle de France, 2014.
- Le chaudron du Dagda (preface by Claude Sterckx). Croix: Éditions du Cénacle de France, 2015.
- (editor, with André-Yves Bourgès) Hagiographie bretonne et mythologie celtique. Marseille: Terre de Promesse, 2016.
- Le cortège du Graal: du mythe celtique au roman arthurien. Marseille: Terre de Promesse, 2019. ISBN 978-2-9561503-0-5.
