= Moritasgus =

Celic epithet attached to Apollo, signifying a possible healing deity

Moritasgus is a Celtic epithet for a healing god found in four inscriptions at Alesia. In two inscriptions, he is identified with the Greco-Roman god Apollo. His consort was the goddess Damona.

== Etymology ==
The name Moritasgus, shared by a 1st-century BC ruler of the Senones, has been analyzed variously. The particle -tasgus has been derived by scholars from a Proto-Celtic stem *tazgo-, *tasgos or *tasko- 'badger'. Xavier Delamarre proposed that the complete name means "Sea Badger", from Gaulish mori 'sea' + tasgos (also tascos or taxos), 'badger'. The European badger produced a secretion used in Gaulish medicaments, hence a possible connection with a healing god.

== Shrine in Alesia ==
Alesia was an oppidum of the Celtic Mandubii in present-day Burgundy. A dedication to the gods alludes to the presence of a shrine at the curative spring, where sick pilgrims could bathe in a sacred pool. The sanctuary itself, located near the eastern gate of the town just outside the city wall, was impressive, with baths and a temple. In addition, there were porticoes, where the sick possibly slept, hoping for divine visions and cures.

Numerous votive objects were dedicated to Moritasgus. These were models of the pilgrims and the afflicted parts of their bodies: these included limbs, internal organs, genitals, breasts, and eyes. Surgeons' tools have also been found, suggesting that the priests also acted as surgeons.

== Selected bibliography ==
- Dictionary of Celtic Myth and Legend. Miranda Green. Thames and Hudson Ltd. London. 1997.
