= Abhean =

Irish mythology character

In Irish mythology, Abhean (Irish pronunciation: [ˈavʲənˠ]), son of Bec-Felmas, was a poet of the Tuatha Dé Danann, and in particular of Lugh. He was killed by Óengus in front of Midir, according to a poem by Fland Mainistreach in Lebor Gabála Érenn.

== Etymology ==
The reconstructed Proto-Celtic lexica at the universities of Leiden and Wales suggest that this name may be derived from Proto-Celtic *Ad-bej-ānos, literally meaning 'at-striking-related-one' and possibly denoting the concept of 'harp-strumming'.

== Bibliography ==
- Ellis, Peter Berresford (1994). Dictionary of Celtic Mythology (Oxford Paperback Reference ed.). Oxford University Press. ISBN 0-19-508961-8.
- Wood, Juliette (2002). The Celts: Life, Myth, and Art. Thorsons Publishers. ISBN 0-00-764059-5.
