= Adsullata =

Celtic goddess

In Celtic mythology, Adsullata was a river goddess of the Continental Celts associated with the River Savus (Sava) in Noricum.

Later she came to Brittany from Celtic Gaul and was believed to be a goddess of hot springs and the origin of the Anglo-Celtic sun goddess, Sul.

== Etymology ==
This theonym appears to be derived from Proto-Celtic *Ad-sūg-lat-ā. That derivation literally means (allative) "sucking liquid", which may have been a byword for the notion of "suck-giving liquid" The Romano-British form of this Proto-Celtic reconstruction would likely have been *Adsuglata.
