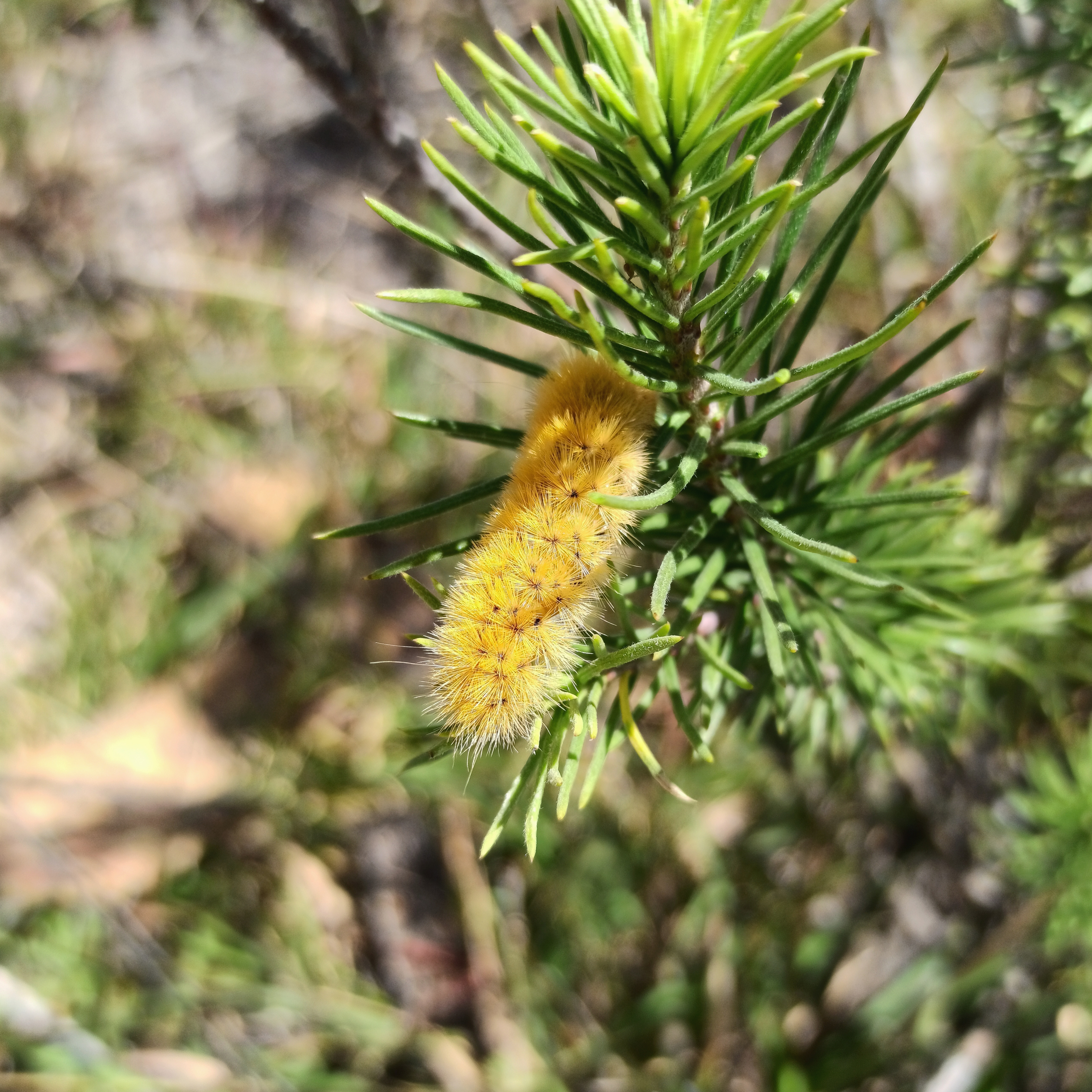

Scientific classification
- Kingdom: Animalia
- Phylum: Arthropoda
- Class: Insecta
- Order: Lepidoptera
- Superfamily: Noctuoidea
- Family: Erebidae
- Subfamily: Arctiinae
- Genus: Lerina; Walker, 1854
- Species: L. incarnata

Binomial name
- Lerina incarnata Walker, 1854

Synonyms
- Ctenucha robinsonii Boisduval, 1869

= Lerina incarnata =

Species of moth

Lerina is a monotypic moth genus in the family Erebidae. Its only species, Lerina incarnata, the crimson-bodied lichen moth, is found in Mexico and southern Arizona. Both the genus and species were first described by Francis Walker in 1854.
