= Turiacus =

Turiacus is a deity, presumably Lusitanian, known from a single Roman dedicatory inscription from Santo Tirso in Portugal. The inscription reads:

L VALERIVS SILVANVS / MILES LEG / VI VICT / [DE]O TVRIACO V S L M

A dedication to Turiacus by Lucius Valerius Silvanus of the VI Roman Legion "Victrix". No other inscription references the deity, but attempts have been made to link the name with proto-Celtic *torko- (Irish torc, Welsh twrch) meaning a wild boar, as well as with imaginary Irish words supposedly meaning a fort or a king.
