= Icaunis =

Gaulish river goddess

In Gallo-Roman religion, Dea Icaunis was the goddess of the river Yonne in Gaul. She is known from a single inscription, found at Auxerre in Burgundy.
