= Abandinus =

Celtic god

Abandinus was a Celtic god or male spirit worshipped at Godmanchester in Cambridgeshire during the Romano-Celtic period.

== Epigraphic evidence ==
Abandinus is represented in Britain on a single altarstone. He is unknown throughout the rest of the Roman Empire and is therefore thought to have been a local god of the Roman fort at Godmanchester in Cambridgeshire, possibly associated with either a natural spring or a stream in the neighbourhood.

The Roman fort at Godmanchester, a strategic site on Ermine Street at the crossing of the River Great Ouse, is thought to have been called Durovigutum. The god is known only from an inscribed bronze feather, very likely some sort of votive object, dedicated to him. The inscription on the bronze feather reads:

"DEO ABANDINO VATIAVCVS D S D"

- ‘To the god Abandinus, Vatiacus dedicates this out of his own funds’.

== Interpreting the god's name ==
The name's meaning is unknown. But it can be narrowed down. The name can be interpreted as an extended form of a stem composed of Proto-Celtic elements deriving from Proto-Indo-European roots *ad- ‘to’ + either *bʰend- ‘sing, rejoice’ or *bʰendʰ- ‘bind’. Along these lines, the name would mean ‘(the god) who sings to (something/someone)’ or ‘(the god) who binds (something/someone) to (something/someone).’

However, it is also possible to see the name as an extended form of a variant form of the Proto-Celtic word *abon- ‘river,’ derived from the Proto-Indo-European root *ab-, *h₂eb- ‘water, river’. The shorter element *abo- likely existed in the Proto-Celtic hydronomy as a word for ‘river’ or ‘water.’ It is evident in Romano-Celtic as an unspecific variant name for the rivers flowing into the Humber, documented as Abus. This element developed in Modern Welsh as aber- meaning ‘river estuary’. This *abo- element could have been the source of the Ab-- element in the theonym Abandinus. So the name can also be analysed as *Ab-Andinus ‘Andinus of the River,’ Andinus being a theonym attested elsewhere in the ancient Roman Empire.
