= Ucuetis =

Gaulish deity

Ucuetis is a Gaulish deity who was venerated at Alesia in Burgundy.

== History ==
Ucuetis was a Gaulish deity who was venerated by the Celtic people in the area of Alesia in the Burgundy region of France. Along with his consort Bergusia, he was portrayed in an image of a divine couple found on the same site with the male figure bearing a hammer and the female appearing as a goddess of prosperity. This image, if it is indeed of the two deities, may indicate that Ucuetis was a patron god of craftsmen. This may be confirmed by the discovery of an epigraphic dedication to the couple, inscribed on a bronze vase and found in the cellar of a huge building: rubbish found in this underground room was made of entirely of scraps of bronze and iron and appears to have been part of the stock of metalsmiths. It is possible that this room was a sanctuary to the local crafts-deities of Alesia, and the superstructure itself may have a craft hall for metalworkers.

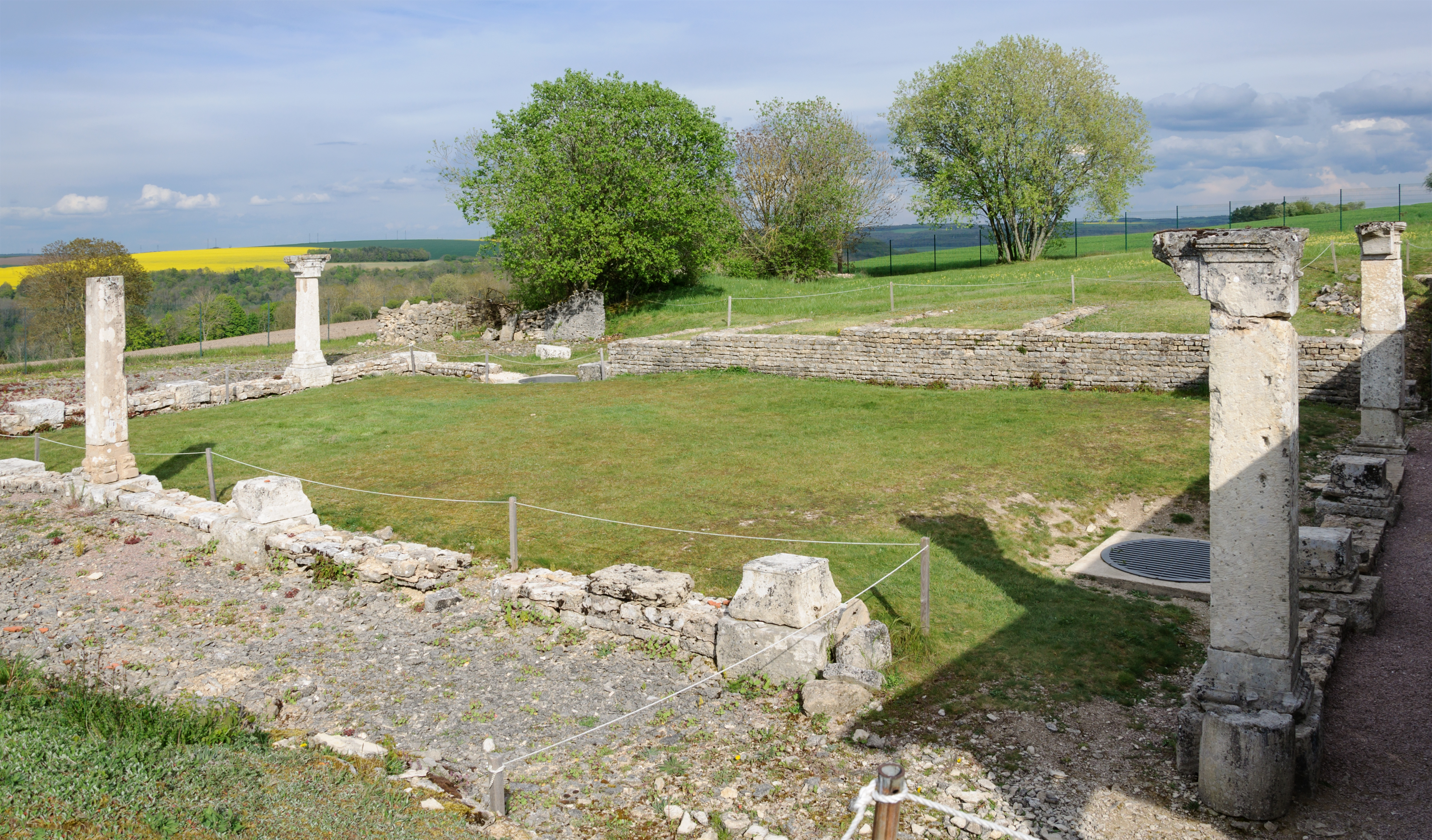
Monument to Ucuetis in the archeological site of Alesia in Alise-Sainte-Reine, Burgundy.

One inscription was discovered on Mont Auxois, the location of ancient Alesia. Another inscription in gaulish language that was found close to a building that was probably a smithy carries the following text:

Martialis Dannotali ieuru Ucuete sosin celicnon, etic gobedbi dugiiontiio Ucuetin in […] Alisia.

— Inscription from Alise-Sainte-Reine / Alesia

Translation:

Martialis, son of Dannotalos dedicates this keliknon (small temple?) to Ucuetis - together with the smiths, who (worship) Ucuetis in Alesia.
