= Abcán =

Dwarf poet in Irish mythology

In Irish mythology, Abcán (modern spelling: Abhcán) was the dwarf poet and musician of the Tuatha Dé Danann, the early Celtic divinities of Ireland. He was said to have a bronze boat with a tin sail.

In the story of the death of the goddess Ruad, Abcán is the dwarf that ferries her from the Otherworld to this one so that she can seduce the human, Aed Srónmár. The sounds of mermaids singing, or in some versions, music from a fairy mound cause her to leap into the water and drown.

In another story, Abcán is captured by the hero, Cúchulainn. He frees himself by playing lullabies so irresistible that the warrior goes to sleep.

Abcán has much in common with, and may be another name for, the dwarf musician Fer Í.
