= Lero (god) =

Obscure Celtic god

Lero is an obscure Celtic god, invoked alongside the goddess Lerina as the eponymous spirit of Lérins in Provence. Nothing is known about these gods apart from these epigraphic dedications.
