= Bergusia =

Celtic goddess of prosperity

Bergusia is a Celtic goddess, consort of the god Ucuetis, and worshipped with him at Alesia in Burgundy. The divine couple are named on inscriptions of the Romano-Celtic period, and an image of a divine couple has been found on the same site, the male figure bearing a hammer, the female appearing as a goddess of prosperity. This image, if it is indeed of the two deities, may indicate that Ucuetis was a patron god of craftsmen. This may be confirmed by the discovery of an epigraphic dedication to the couple, inscribed on a bronze vase and found in the cellar of a huge building: rubbish found in this underground room consisted entirely of scraps of bronze and iron and appears to have been part of the stock of metalsmiths. It is possible that this room was a sanctuary to the local crafts-deities of Alesia, and the superstructure itself may have a craft hall for metalworkers.
