= Canola (mythology) =

In Irish mythology, Cana Cludhmor was a woman who played a vital role in the mythical invention of the harp. Cana Cludhmor fled to the seashore from her husband Machuel, and heard beautiful music on the wind and was soon lulled into a deep sleep. On finding her, Machuel realised the wind had created the music by blowing through partially rotted sinew still attached to a nearby whale skeleton. He designed the harp based on this.

Her name was misprinted as Canola in some references.
