= Celtic deities =

Gods and goddesses of the Ancient Celtic religion

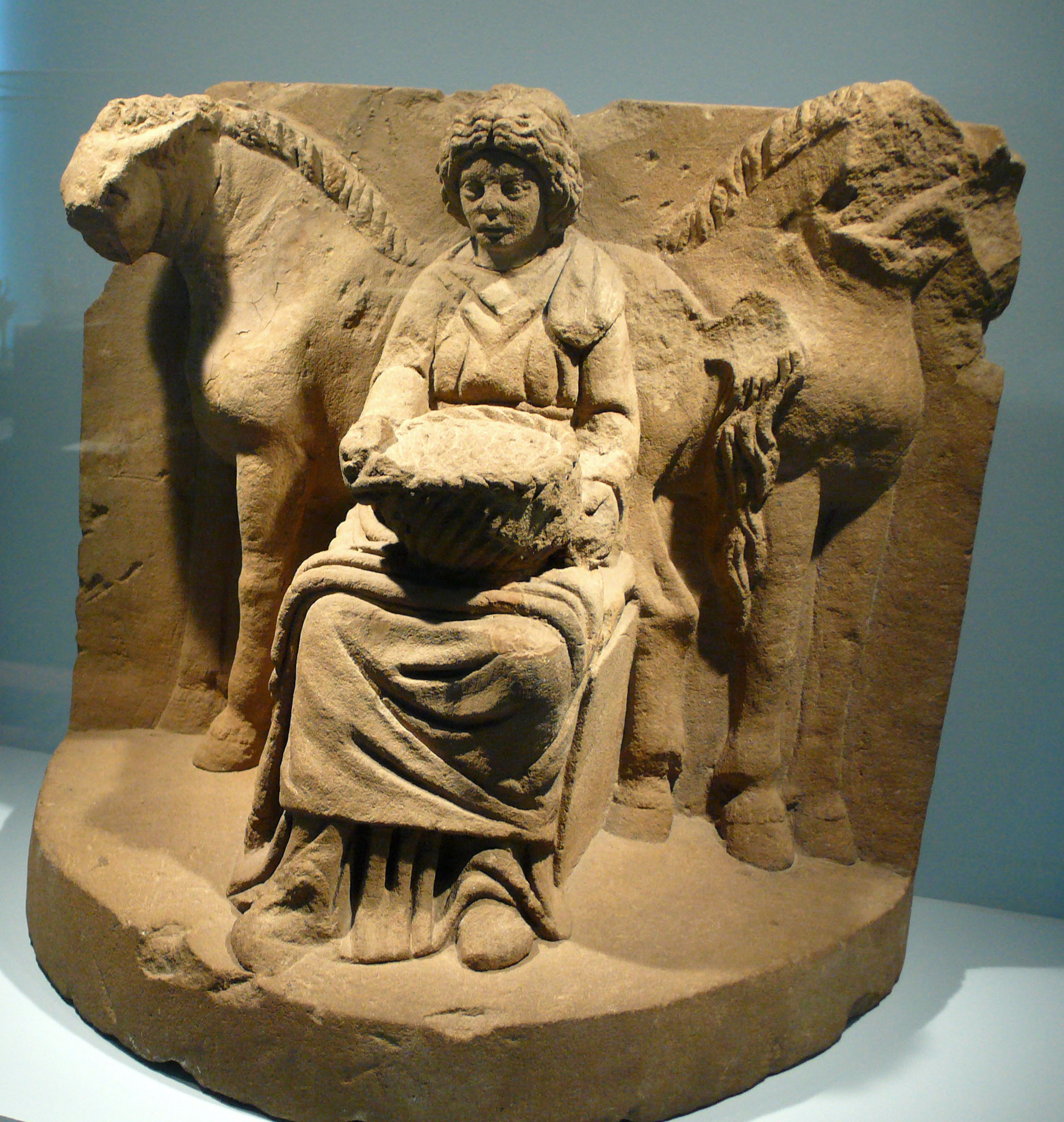
Epona, the Celtic goddess of horses and riding, lacked a direct Roman equivalent, and is therefore one of the most persistent distinctly Celtic deities. This image comes from Germany, about 200 AD

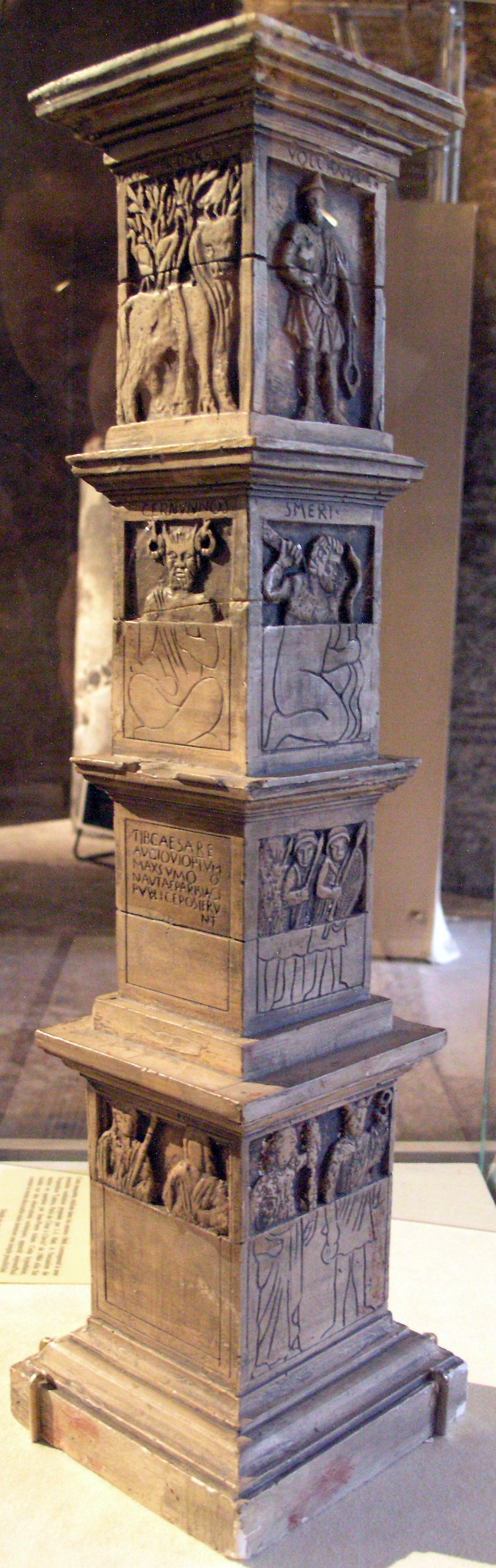
Replica of the incomplete Pillar of the Boatmen, from Paris, with four deities, including the only depiction of Cernunnos to name him (left, 2nd from top)

The gods and goddesses of the pre-Christian Celtic peoples are known from a variety of sources, including ancient places of worship, statues, engravings, cult objects, and place or personal names. The ancient Celts appear to have had a pantheon of deities comparable to others in Indo-European religion, each linked to aspects of life and the natural world. By a process of syncretism, after the Roman conquest of Celtic areas, most of these became associated with their Roman equivalents, and their worship continued until Christianization. Epona was an exception and retained without association with any Roman deity. Pre-Roman Celtic art produced few images of deities, and these are hard to identify, lacking inscriptions, but in the post-conquest period many more images were made, some with inscriptions naming the deity. Most of the specific information we have therefore comes from Latin writers and the archaeology of the post-conquest period. More tentatively, links can be made between ancient Celtic deities and figures in early medieval Irish and Welsh literature, although all these works were produced well after Christianization.

The locus classicus for the Celtic gods of Gaul is the passage in Julius Caesar's Commentarii de Bello Gallico (The Gallic War, 52–51 BC) in which he names six of them, together with their functions. He says that Mercury was the most honoured of all the deities and many images of him were to be found. Mercury was regarded as the inventor of all the arts, the patron of travellers and of merchants, and the most powerful deity in matters of commerce and gain. After him, the Gauls honoured Apollo, who drove away diseases, Mars, who controlled war, Jupiter, who ruled the heavens, and Minerva, who promoted handicrafts. He adds that the Gauls regarded a god he likened to Dis Pater as their ancestor.

In characteristic Roman fashion, Caesar does not refer to these figures by their native names but by the names of the Roman deities with which he equated them, a procedure that complicates the task of identifying his Gaulish deities with their counterparts in the insular Celtic literatures. He also presents a neat schematic equation of deity and function that is quite foreign to the vernacular literary testimony. Yet, given its limitations, his brief catalog is a valuable witness.

The deities named by Caesar are well-attested in the later epigraphic record of Gaul and Britain. Not infrequently, their names are coupled with native Celtic theonyms and epithets, such as Mercury Visucius, Lenus Mars, Jupiter Poeninus, or Sulis Minerva. Unsyncretised theonyms are also widespread, particularly among goddesses such as Sulevia, Sirona, Rosmerta, and Epona. In all, several hundred names containing a Celtic element are attested in Gaul. The majority occur only once, which has led some scholars to conclude that the Celtic deities and their cults were local and tribal rather than national. Supporters of this view cite Lucan's mention of a deity called Teutates, which they interpret as "god of the tribe" (it is thought that teuta- meant "tribe" in Celtic).

== General characteristics ==
Evidence from the Roman period presents a wide array of gods and goddesses who are represented by images or inscribed dedications. Certain deities were venerated widely across the Celtic world, while others were limited only to a single region or even to a specific locality. Certain local or regional deities might have greater popularity within their spheres than supra-regional deities. For example, in east-central Gaul, the local healing goddess Sequana of present-day Burgundy, was probably more influential in the minds of her local devotees than the Matres, who were worshipped all over Britain, Gaul, and the Rhineland.

=== Supra-regional cults ===
Among the divinities transcending tribal boundaries were the Matres, Cernunnos, the sky-god Taranis, and Epona. Epona, the horse-goddess, was invoked by devotees living as far apart as Britain, Rome, and Bulgaria. A distinctive feature of the Matres, or mother-goddesses, was their frequent depiction as a triad in many parts of Britain, in Gaul, and on the Rhine, although it is possible to identify strong regional differences within this group.

The Celtic sky-god also had variations in the way he was perceived and his cult expressed. Yet the link between the Celtic Jupiter and the solar wheel is maintained over a wide area, from Hadrian's Wall to Cologne and Nîmes.

=== Local cults ===
It is sometimes possible to identify regional, tribal, or sub-tribal divinities. Specific to the Remi of northwest Gaul is a distinctive group of stone carvings depicting a triple-faced god with shared facial features and luxuriant beards. In the Iron Age, this same tribe issued coins with three faces, a motif found elsewhere in Gaul. Another tribal god was Lenus, venerated by the Treveri. He was worshipped at a number of Treveran sanctuaries, the most splendid of which was at the tribal capital of Trier itself. Yet he was also exported to other areas: Lenus has altars set up to him in Chedworth in Gloucestershire and Caerwent in Wales.

Many Celtic divinities were extremely localised, sometimes occurring in just one shrine, perhaps because the spirit concerned was a genius loci, the governing spirit of a particular place. In Gaul, more than four hundred different Celtic deity-names are recorded, of which at least 300 occur just once. Sequana was confined to her spring shrine near Dijon, Sulis belonged to Bath. The divine couple Ucuetis and Bergusia were worshipped solely at Alesia in Burgundy. The British god Nodens is associated above all with the great sanctuary at Lydney (although he also appears at Cockersand Moss in Cumbria). Two other British deities, Cocidius and Belatucadrus, were both Martial deities and were each worshipped in clearly defined territories in the area of Hadrian's Wall. There are many other deities whose names may betray origins as topographical spirits. Vosegus presided over the mountains of the Vosges, Luxovius over the spa-settlement of Luxeuil, and Vasio over the town of Vaison in the Lower Rhône Valley.

=== Divine couples ===
One notable feature of Gaulish and Romano-Celtic sculpture is the frequent appearance of male and female deities in pairs, such as Rosmerta and ‘Mercury’, Nantosuelta and Sucellos, Sirona and Apollo Grannus, Borvo and Damona, or Mars Loucetius and Nemetona.

== Notable deity types ==
=== Antlered deities ===
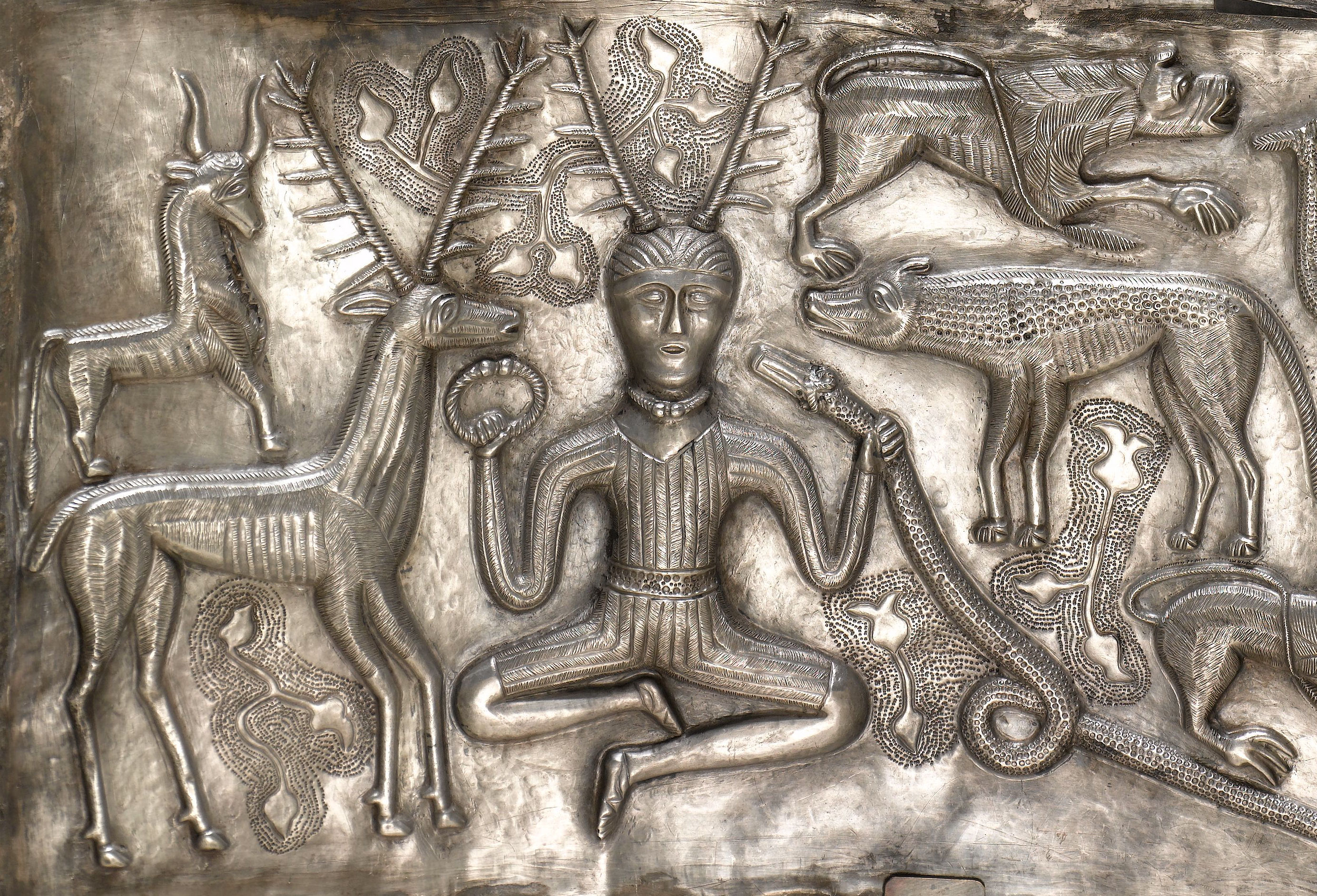
Detail of the antlered figure holding a torc and a ram-headed snake depicted on the 1st or 2nd century BC Gundestrup cauldron discovered in Jutland, Denmark

A recurrent figure in Gaulish iconography is a deity sitting cross-legged with antlers, sometimes surrounded by animals, often wearing or holding a torc. The name frequently now applied to this deity, Cernunnos, is attested only a few times: on the Pillar of the Boatmen, a relief in Paris (currently reading ERNUNNOS, but an early sketch shows it as having read CERNUNNOS in the 18th century); on an inscription from Montagnac (αλλετ[ει]νος καρνονου αλ[ι]σο[ντ]εας, "Alletinos [dedicated this] to Carnonos of Alisontea"); and on a pair of identical inscriptions from Seinsel-Rëlent ("Deo Ceruninco"). Figured representations of this sort of deity, however, are widespread; the earliest known was found at Val Camonica in northern Italy, while the most famous is plate A of the Gundestrup Cauldron, a 1st-century BC vessel found in Denmark. On the Gundestrup Cauldron and sometimes elsewhere, Cernunnos, or a similar figure, is accompanied by a ram-headed serpent. At Reims, the figure is depicted with a cornucopia overflowing with grains or coins.

=== Healing deities ===
Healing deities are known from many parts of the Celtic world; they frequently have associations with thermal springs, healing wells, herbalism, and light.

Brigid, the triple goddess of healing, poetry, and smithcraft is perhaps the most well-known of the Insular Celtic deities of healing. She is associated with many healing springs and wells. A lesser-known Irish healing goddess is Airmed, also associated with a healing well and with the healing art of herbalism.

In Romano-Celtic tradition Belenus (traditionally derived from a Celtic root *belen- ‘bright’, although other etymologies have been convincingly proposed) is found chiefly in southern France and northern Italy. Apollo Grannus, although concentrated in central and eastern Gaul, also “occurs associated with medicinal waters in Brittany [...] and far away in the Danube Basin”. Grannus's companion is frequently the goddess Sirona. Another important Celtic deity of healing is Bormo or Borvo, particularly associated with thermal springs such as Bourbonne-les-Bains and Bourbon-Lancy. Such hot springs were (and often still are) believed to have therapeutic value. Green interprets the name Borvo to mean “seething, bubbling, or boiling spring water”.

=== Solar deities ===
In Celtic culture, the sun is assumed to have been feminine, and several goddesses have been proposed as possibly solar in character.

In Irish, the name of the sun, Grian, is feminine. The figure known as Áine is generally assumed to have been either synonymous with her, or her sister, assuming the role of Summer Sun while Grian was the Winter Sun.

Similarly, Étaín has at times been considered to be another theonym associated with the sun; if this is the case, then the pan-Celtic Epona might also have been originally solar in nature, although Roman syncretism pushed her toward a lunar role.

The British Sulis has a name cognate with that of other Indo-European solar deities such as the Greek Helios and Indic Surya, and bears some solar traits such as association with the eye as well as epithets associated with light. The theonym Sulevia, which is more widespread and probably unrelated to Sulis, is sometimes taken to have suggested a pan-Celtic role as a solar goddess. She indeed might have been the de facto solar deity of the Celts.

The Welsh Olwen has at times been considered a vestige of the local sun goddess, in part due to the possible etymological association with the wheel and the colours gold, white, and red.

Brighid has at times been argued as having had a solar nature, fitting her role as a goddess of fire and light.

=== Deities of sacred waters ===
==== Goddesses ====
In Ireland, there are numerous holy wells dedicated to the goddess Brighid. There are dedications to ‘Minerva’ in Britain and throughout the Celtic areas of the continent. At Bath, Minerva was identified with the goddess Sulis, whose cult there centred on the thermal springs.

Other goddesses were also associated with sacred springs, such as Icovellauna among the Treveri and Coventina at Carrawburgh. Damona and Bormana also serve this function in companionship with the spring-god Borvo (see above).

A number of goddesses were deified rivers, notably Boann (of the River Boyne), Sinann (the River Shannon), Sequana (the deified Seine), Matrona (the Marne), Souconna (the deified Saône), and perhaps Belisama (the Ribble).

==== Gods ====
While the most well-known deity of the sea is the god Manannán, and his father Lir mostly considered as god of the ocean. Nodens is associated with healing, the sea, hunting, and dogs.

In Lusitanian and Celtic polytheism, Borvo (also Bormo, Bormanus, Bormanicus, Borbanus, Boruoboendua, Vabusoa, Labbonus, or Borus) was a healing deity associated with bubbling spring water. Condatis was associated with the confluences of rivers in Britain and Gaul, Luxovius was the god of the sacred waters of Luxeuil and was worshipped in Gaul. Dian Cécht was the god of healing to the Irish people. He healed with the fountain of healing, and he was indirectly the cause of the name of the River Barrow. Grannus was a deity associated with spas, healing thermal and mineral springs, and the sun.

=== Horse deities ===
==== Goddesses ====
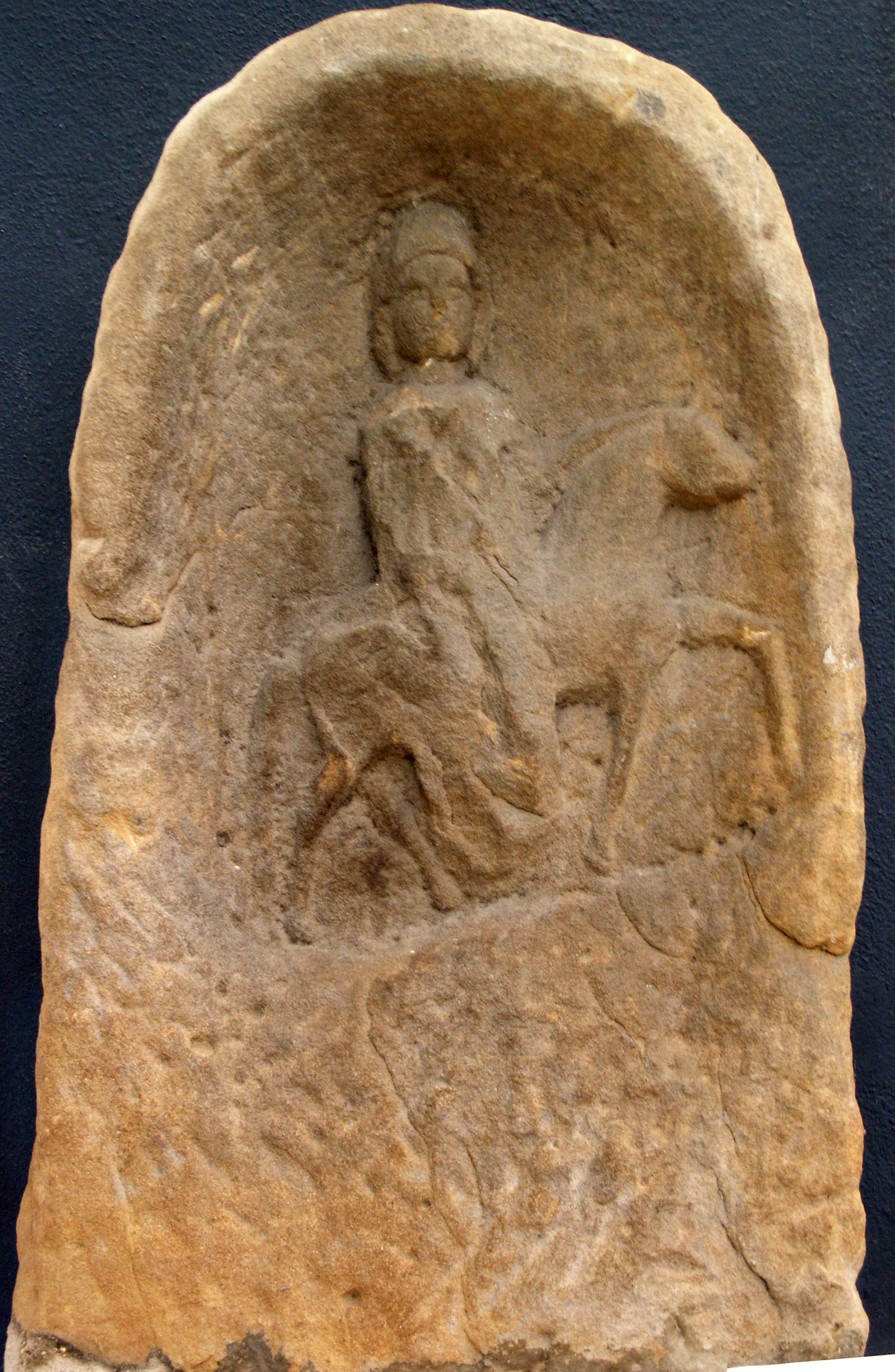
Epona, 3rd century AD, from Freyming (Moselle), France (Musée Lorrain, Nancy)

The horse, an instrument of Indo-European expansion, plays a part in all the mythologies of the various Celtic cultures. The cult of the Gaulish horse goddess Epona was widespread and as noted above, may have solar associations. Adopted by the Roman cavalry, worship of Epona spread throughout much of Europe, even to the city of Rome itself. She seems to be the embodiment of "horse power" or horsemanship, which was likely perceived as a power vital for the success and protection of the tribe. She has insular analogues in the Welsh Rhiannon and in the Irish Édaín Echraidhe (echraidhe, "horse riding") and in Macha, who outran the fastest steeds.

A number of pre-conquest Celtic coins show a female rider who may be Epona.

The Irish horse goddess Macha, perhaps a threefold goddess, is associated with battle and sovereignty. Although a goddess in her own right, she is also considered to be part of Morrigan, the triple goddess of battle and slaughter. Other goddesses in their own right associated with the Morrígan were Badhbh Catha and Nemain.

==== God ====
Atepomarus in Celtic Gaul was a healing god, and inscriptions were found in Mauvières (Indre). The epithet is sometimes translated as "Great Horseman" or "possessing a great horse".

=== Mother goddesses ===
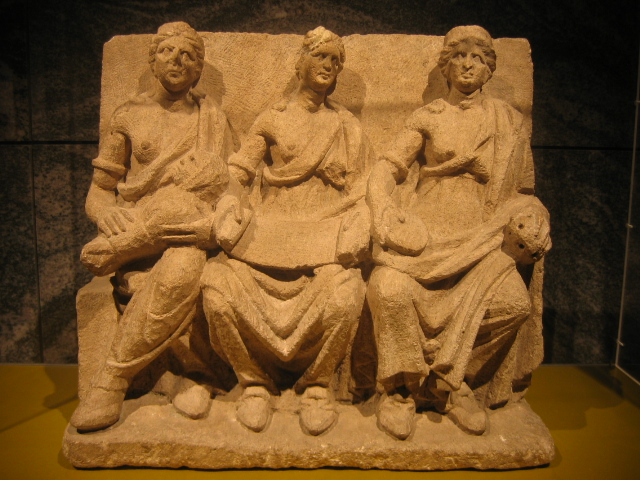
Terracotta relief of the Matres, from Bibracte, city of the Aedui in Gaul

Mother goddesses are a recurrent feature in Celtic religions. The epigraphic record reveals many dedications to the Matres or Matronae, which are particularly prolific around Cologne in the Rhineland. Iconographically, Celtic mother goddesses may appear singly or, quite often, triply; they usually hold fruit, cornucopiae, or paterae; they may also be full-breasted (or many-breasted) figures nursing infants.

Welsh and Irish tradition preserve a number of mother figures such as the Welsh Dôn, Rhiannon (‘great queen’), and Modron (from Matrona, ‘great mother’), and the Irish Danu, Boand, Macha, and Ernmas. However, all of these fulfill many roles in the mythology and symbolism of the Celts, and cannot be limited to motherhood alone. In many of their tales, their having children is only mentioned in passing, and is not a central facet of their identity. "Mother" Goddesses may also be goddesses of warfare and slaughter, or of healing and smithcraft.

Mother goddesses were at times symbols of sovereignty, creativity, birth, fertility, sexual union, and nurturing. At other times they could be seen as punishers and destroyers: their offspring may be helpful or dangerous to the community, and the circumstances of their birth may lead to curses, geasa or hardship, such as in the case of Macha's curse of the Ulstermen or Rhiannon's possible devouring of her child and subsequent punishment.

=== Lugus ===
According to Caesar the god most honoured by the Gauls was ‘Mercury’, and this is confirmed by numerous images and inscriptions. Mercury's name is often coupled with Celtic epithets, particularly in eastern and central Gaul; the commonest such names include Visucius, Cissonius, and Gebrinius. Another name, Lugus, is inferred from the recurrent place-name Lugdunon ('the fort of Lugus') from which the modern Lyon, Laon, and Loudun in France, Leiden in the Netherlands, and Lugo in Galicia derive their names; a similar element can be found in Carlisle (formerly Castra Luguvallium), Legnica in Poland and the county Louth in Ireland, derived from the Irish "Lú" that comes from "Lugh". The Irish and Welsh cognates of Lugus are Lugh and Lleu, respectively, and certain traditions concerning these figures mesh neatly with those of the Gaulish god. Caesar's description of the latter as "the inventor of all the arts" might almost have been a paraphrase of Lugh's conventional epithet samildánach ("possessed of many talents"), while Lleu is addressed as "master of the twenty crafts" in the Mabinogi.

Lugh is said to have instituted the festival of Lughnasadh, celebrated on 1 August, in commemoration of his foster-mother Tailtiu.

=== Taranis ===
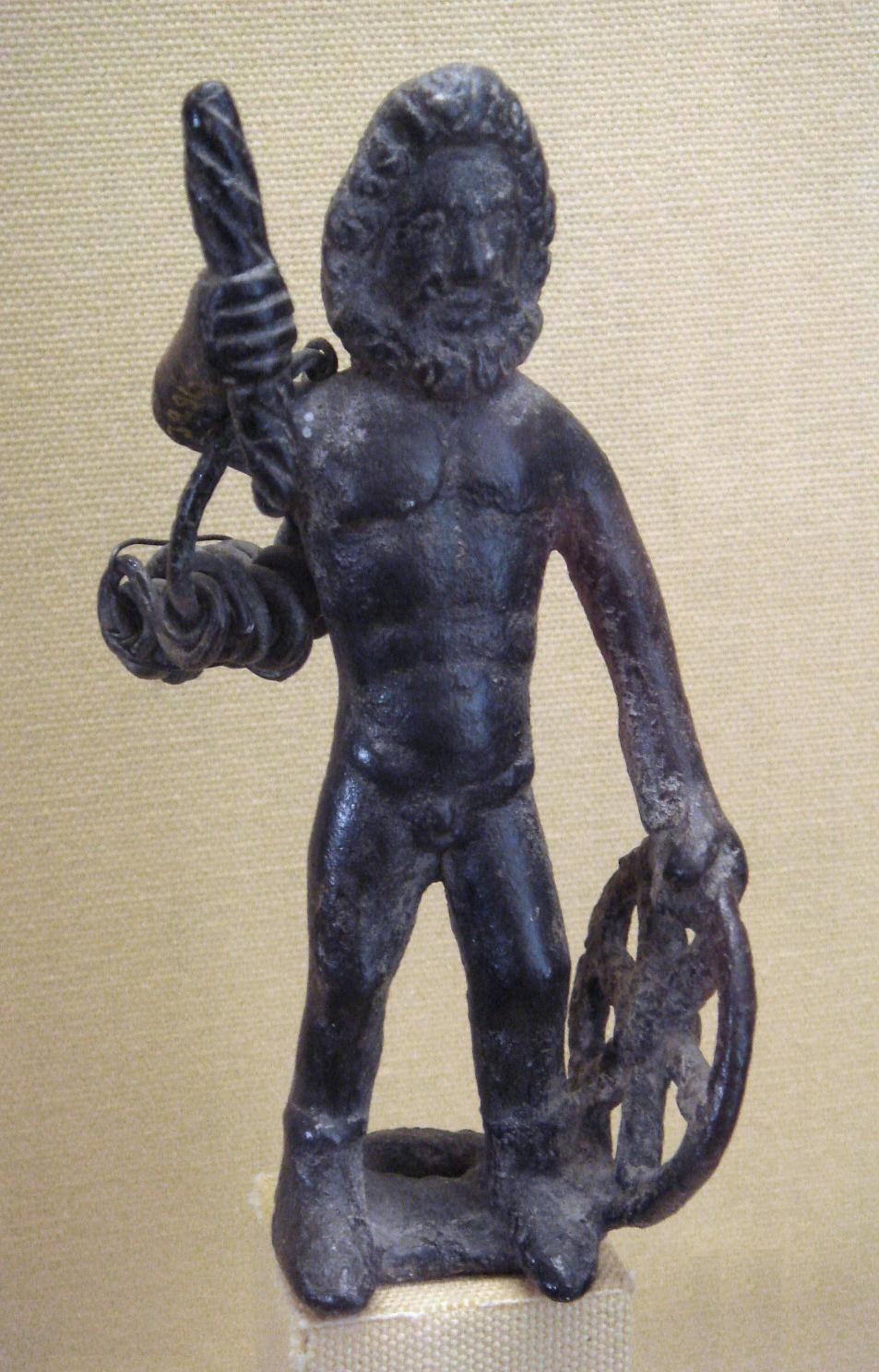
Gallo-Roman Taranis Jupiter with wheel and thunderbolt, carrying torcs, Haute Marne

The Gaulish Jupiter is often depicted with a thunderbolt in one hand and a distinctive solar wheel in the other. Scholars frequently identify this wheel/sky god with Taranis, who is mentioned by Lucan. The name Taranis may be cognate with those of Taran, a minor figure in Welsh mythology, and Turenn, the father of the 'three gods of Dana' in Irish mythology.

Wheel amulets are found in Celtic areas from before the conquest.

=== Toutatis ===
Teutates, also spelled Toutatis (Celtic: "Him of the tribe"), was one of three Celtic gods mentioned by the Roman poet Lucan in the 1st century, the other two being Esus ("lord") and Taranis ("thunderer"). According to later commentators, victims sacrificed to Teutates were killed by being plunged headfirst into a vat filled with an unspecified liquid. Present-day scholars frequently speak of ‘the toutates’ as plural, referring respectively to the patrons of the several tribes. Of two later commentators on Lucan's text, one identifies Teutates with Mercury, the other with Mars. He is also known from dedications in Britain, where his name was written as, Toutatis.

Paul-Marie Duval, who considers the Gaulish Mars a syncretism with the Celtic toutates, notes that:

Les représentations de Mars, beaucoup plus rares [que celles de Mercure] (une trentaine de bas-reliefs), plus monotones dans leur académisme classique, et ses surnoms plus de deux fois plus nombreux (une cinquantaine) s'équilibrent pour mettre son importance à peu près sur le même plan que celle de Mercure mais sa domination n'est pas de même nature. Duval (1993)

Mars' representations, much rarer [than Mercury's] (thirty-odd bas reliefs) and more monotone in their studied classicism, and his epithets which are more than twice as numerous (about fifty), balance each other to place his importance roughly on the same level as Mercury, but his domination is not of the same kind.

=== Esus ===
Esus appears in two continental monuments, including the Pillar of the Boatmen, as an axeman cutting branches from trees.

=== Gods with hammers ===
Sucellos, the 'good striker' is usually portrayed as a middle-aged bearded man, with a long-handled hammer, or perhaps a beer barrel suspended from a pole. His companion, Nantosuelta, the goddess of nature, the earth, fire, and fertility, is sometimes depicted alongside him. When together, they are accompanied by symbols associated with prosperity and domesticity. This figure is often identified with Silvanus, worshipped in southern Gaul under similar attributes; Dis Pater, from whom, according to Caesar, all the Gauls believed themselves to be descended; and the Irish Dagda, the 'good god', who possessed a cauldron that was never empty and a huge club.

=== Gods of strength and eloquence ===
A club-wielding god identified as Ogmios is readily observed in Gaulish iconography. In Gaul, he was identified with the Roman Hercules. He was portrayed as an old man with swarthy skin and armed with a bow and club. He was also a god of eloquence, and in that aspect he was represented as drawing along a company of men whose ears were chained to his tongue.

Ogmios' Irish equivalent was Ogma. Ogham script, an Irish writing system dating from the 4th century AD, was said to have been invented by him.

=== The divine bull ===
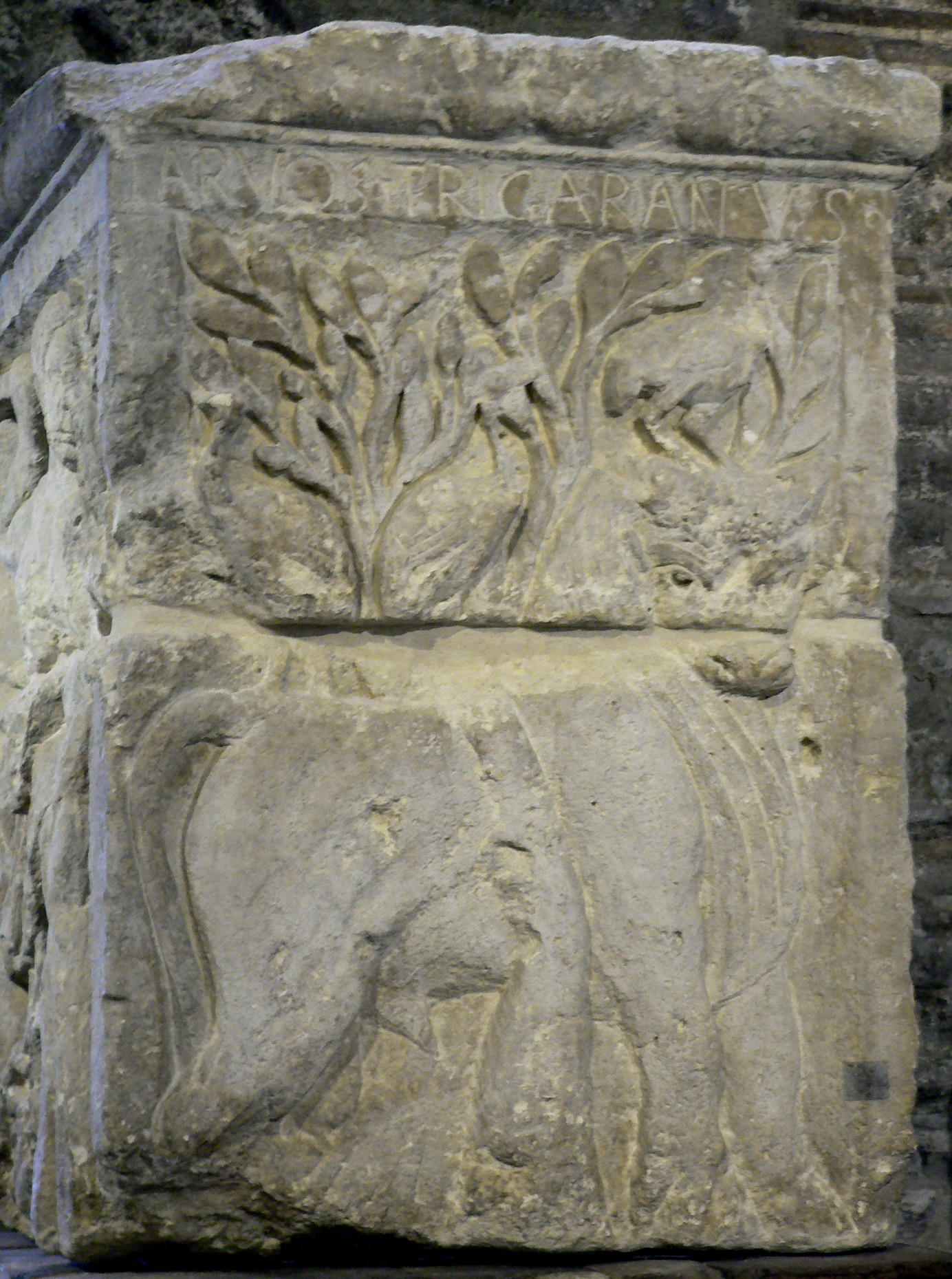
The relief of Tarvos Trigaranus on the Pillar of the Boatmen

Another prominent zoomorphic deity type is the divine bull. Tarvos Trigaranus ("bull with three cranes") is pictured on reliefs from the cathedral at Trier, Germany, and at Notre-Dame de Paris.

In Irish literature, the Donn Cuailnge ("Brown Bull of Cooley") plays a central role in the epic Táin Bó Cuailnge ("The Cattle-Raid of Cooley").

=== The ram-headed snake ===
A distinctive ram-headed snake accompanies Gaulish gods in a number of representations, including the antlered god from the Gundestrup cauldron, Mercury, and Mars.

== Table ==
This table shows some of the Celtic and Romano-Celtic gods and goddesses mentioned above, in Romanized form as well as ancient Gaulish, British, or Iberian names as well as those of the Tuatha Dé Danann and characters from the Mabinogion. They are arranged so as to suggest some linguistic or functional associations among the ancient deities and literary figures; needless to say, all such associations are subject to continual scholarly revision and disagreement. In particular, it has been noted by scholars such as Sjoestedt that it is inappropriate to try to fit Insular Celtic deities into a Roman format as such attempts seriously distort the Insular deities.

Interpretatio Romana	Gaulish, British, & Celtiberian	Welsh	Old Irish
Apollo	Belenus; Borvo; Grannus	Beli Mawr	Bel
Apollo	Maponos	Mabon	Maccan
		Brân	Bran
Victoria	Bodua		Badb
Victoria	Brigantia		Brigid
	Cicolluis		Cichol
	Cernunnos		Conall Cernach
		Dôn	Danu
Dīs Pater			Donn; Dá Derga
Demeter Erinys	Epona	Rhiannon	Macha
Vulcan	Gobannos	Gofannon	Goibniu
Neptune		Manawydan	Manannán
Hecate	Matronae	Modron	Morrígan
Victoria	Nemetona		
Hercules	Ogmios	Eufydd	Ogma
Maia	Rosmerta		
Hygieia	Sirona		
Silvanus	Sucellus		Dagda
Minerva	Sulis; Belisama; Senuna; Coventina; Icovellauna; Sequana		
Junones	Suleviae		
Jupiter	Taranis	Taran	Turenn
Mars	Nodens	Lludd/Nudd	Nuada
Mars	Toutatis; Cnabetius (Cenabetius)		
Mars	Neton		Neit
Mercury	Lugus	Lleu	Lugh
Mercury	Viducus	Gwydion	
	Nemedus		Nemed
	Crouga		Crom Cruach

== See also ==
- Welsh mythology (includes a more comprehensive list of Welsh deities, along with proposed cosmogonies and myths)
