= Severia gens =

Ancient Roman family

The gens Severia was an obscure plebeian family at ancient Rome. No members of this gens appear in history, but many are known from inscriptions.

== Origin ==
The nomen Severius belongs to a class of gentilicia formed directly from cognomina, in this case the common Latin surname Severus, originally referring to someone whose manner or appearance would be described as "serious" or "stern". It was one of a large group of cognomina derived from the character of an individual. Several of the earlier Severii are mentioned in inscriptions from Corfinium in Sabinum, with others from neighboring Sulmo and Alba Fucens, suggesting that the family was of Paelignian origin, or at least had settled in this part of Sabinum by the first century.

== Praenomina ==
The Severii used a wide variety of common praenomina, including Gaius, Lucius, Marcus, Titus, Decimus, and Quintus, without any distinct preference; other praenomina appear occasionally.

== Members ==
This list includes abbreviated praenomina. For an explanation of this practice, see filiation.

- Severia Severiana, the wife of Quintus Clodus Omuncio, with whom she was buried in a first-century tomb at Novaria in Cisalpine Gaul, dedicated by their daughter, Optata Clodia.
- Severius, named in an inscription from Pompeii in Campania.
- Severius Acceptus, a soldier in the Legio VIII Augusta, buried at Chalcedon in Bithynia and Pontus between AD 50 and 70. He was forty-six years old, and had been retired for six years. He left four hundred coins for his heir Dubitatius Attianus.
- Quintus Severius Marcellus, the father of Quintus Severius Marcianus of Noviodunum in Germania Superior.
- Quintus Severius Q. f. Marcianus, decurion at Noviodunum, had also served as aedile, duumvir, and prefect of various orders, according to an inscription dating to the first or second century.
- Severius Menander, a freedman named in an inscription from Rome, dating to the first half of the second century.
- Marcus Severius Tacitus, a soldier in the century of Justus, stationed at Rome in AD 143.
- Aulus Severius, a prefect of some sort at Alba Fucens in Sabinum during the second century.
- Decimus Severius, buried at Corfinium in Sabinum during the second century.
- Decimus Severius D. l. Epigonus, a freedman, and the husband of Decimia Gemella. They built a second-century tomb at Corfinium for their daughter, Severia Maximilla.
- Severia Maximilla, the daughter of Decimus Severius Epigonus and Decimia Gemell, buried at Corfinium, aged six years, ten months.
- Severia Rufina, a young woman buried at Collippo in Lusitania during the second century, aged fifteen, with a monument from her mother, Licinia Flacila.
- Severia Aphrodite, buried at Venusia in Samnium, in a tomb dating to the middle of the second century, and dedicated by her husband, Receptus, a freedman of the emperor, with whom she had lived for thirty-seven years.
- Severia Severa, buried at Corfinium in the middle of the second century, along with her sister, Avelia Prisca, in a tomb dedicated by their mother, Capria Quinta.
- Gaius Severius Valens, decurion, quaestor, and duumvir at Viminacium in Moesia Superior, made an offering to Ceres in the middle or late second century.
- Severius Severus, a flamen at Corfinium in the latter half of the second century.
- Gaius Severius Emeritus, a centurion, made an offering to the local deities at Aquae Sulis in Britannia, dating between the late first and end of the third century.
- Severia Lupula, made an offering to Jupiter Optimus Maximus at Mogontiacum in Germania Superior, along with her husband, whose name has not been preserved, in an inscription dating to the second century, or the first half of the third.
- Severia Martia, buried at Orolaunum in Gallia Belgica, with a monument from her daughter, Tonnia Glabra, dating to the second or third century.
- Titus Severius Modestus, made an offering to Borvo and Damona at Aquae Bormonis in Gallia Lugdunensis, according to an inscription from the second or third century.
- Titus Severius Saturninus, dedicated a second- or third-century tomb at Ugernum in Gallia Narbonensis for his wife, Statilia Avita.
- Severius Verus, buried at the present site of Übach-Palenberg, formerly part of Germania Inferior, with a monument from his wife, Friomathina Animula, (Note: Her name, evidently a Latin diminutive of Friomatha, is Germanic; evidently this was a mixed marriage in a frontier province. Animula, a diminutive of the Latin Anima, means "little soul".) dating to the second or third century.
- Severius, named in an inscription from Alba Julia in Dacia, dating to the latter half of the second century, or the first half of the third.
- Severius, a cavalry soldier named in a sepulchral inscription from Mogontiacum, dating to the latter half of the second century, or the first half of the third.
- Gaius Severius, named in an inscription from Alba Julia, dating from the latter half of the second century, or the first half of the third.
- Severia, buried in a second- or third-century family sepulchre at Germisara in Dacia, aged sixty-seven.
- Severia Apr[...], the wife of Marcus Valerius Maximus, a priest of Sol Invictus and Mithras, and a keen astrologer, who built a sepulchre for his family at Mediolanum in Cisalpine Gaul, dating to the third century, or the second half of the second.
- Severius Lupus, made an offering to a local deity at Colonia in Germania Inferior, according to an inscription from the third century, or the latter part of the second.
- Severia Madoce, along with Gaius Servius Gratus, one of the heirs of Sacconia Secundilla, a woman buried at Ostia in Latium during the third century, or the latter half of the second.
- Severia Severa, dedicated a monument at Haedui in Gallia Lugdunensis, dating to the late second or early third century, to her husband, Pisonius Asclepiodotus, an unguentarius, or ointment merchant, and one of the Seviri Augustales at Lugdunum in Gallia Lugdunensis, with whom she had lived for thirty-five years.
- Marcus Severius Severus, a soldier serving in the Legio III Italica at Carnuntum in Pannonia Superior in AD 212.
- Severius Lupulus, buried at Borbetomagus in Germania Superior, aged thirty-five years, five months, along with his brother, Severius Florentinus, with a monument dedicated by their mother, dating to the first half of the third century.
- Severius Florentinus, buried at Borbetomagus, aged twenty-two years, ten months, along with his brother, Severius Lupulus, with a monument from their mother, dating to the first half of the third century.
- Titus Severius Primitivus, a freedman buried at Burdigala in Gallia Aquitania, aged thirty, with a monument dating to the first half of the third century, dedicated by Titus Severius Secundus, his patron and probably his former master.
- Titus Severius Secundus, the patron, and likely former master of the freedman Titus Severius Primitivus, for whom he dedicated a funerary monument at Burdigala, dating to the first half of the third century.
- Gaius Severius Pressus, one of a number of persons making offerings at Segisamo in Hispania Citerior in AD 239. He might be the same Severius Pressus buried at Auca, aged forty.
- Severius Severianus, a soldier in the Legio III Italica at Brigantium in Raetia, made an offering to Mercury between AD 238 and 244.
- Severius Mercator, a soldier buried at Rome during the third century.
- Sextus Severius Salvator, praefectus castrorum at Uxellodunum in Britannia, made an offering to Sol Invictus, commemorated in a third century inscription.
- Decimus Severius D. f. Severus, aedile and duumvir jure dicundo, buried at Sulmo in Sabinum during the third century, along with his wife, Decimia Proposis.
- Severia Secundina, the wife of Aurelius Marius, a standard bearer in the Legio XIII Gemina, with whom she made an offering to Nemesis at the Roman fortress of Apulum in Dacia, dating to the mid-third century.
- Severia, buried in a fifth-century tomb at Ticinum in Cisalpine Gaul.

=== Undated Severii ===
- Severia, buried at Aquileia in Venetia and Histria, in a tomb dedicated by Marcus Aurelius M[...].
- Severia, buried at the present site of Saint-Gervais-sur-Roubion, formerly part of Gallia Narbonensis, along with her brother, Titus Severius Servandus, in a tomb dedicated by their mother, Patula.
- Severia, buried at Lambaesis in Numidia, aged forty, with a monument from her husband, Rusticanus.
- Severius, a potter whose mark was found on a piece of pottery from Londinium in Britannia.
- Severius, a potter whose maker's mark was found on a piece of pottery from Bagacum in Gallia Belgica.
- Severius, a potter whose mark was found on a piece of pottery between Lugdunum and Augusta in Gallia Narbonensis.
- Lucius Severius, named in an inscription found at Harelbeke, formerly part of Gallia Belgica, should perhaps be read "Lucius Gavius Severus", as his name is preceded by that of Marcus Gavius Tertius Severus in the same inscription.
- Tiberius Severius, mentioned in the sepulchral inscription of Julia Marcella, the wife of Lucius Severius Severianus, at Valentia in Gallia Narbonensis. Julia and Severianus may have been his parents.
- Gaius Severius Albanus, a veteran soldier buried at Ancyra in Galatia, aged forty, with a monument from his friend, Aurelius Seneca.
- Severius Carillus, built a tomb for Liccatulia at Divodurum in Gallia Belgica.
- Severius Cobrunus, dedicated a tomb at Lugdunum for his mothers, Callistia Ma and Tertinia Primitiva.
- Severia Ɔ. l. Faustina or Faustilla, a freedwoman buried at Rome, aged forty-five, along with Marcus Ennius Priscus, also aged forty-five, perhaps her husband.
- Sextus Severius Firmus, named in an inscription from Nemausus in Gallia Narbonensis.
- Severius Flavus, made an offering at Aquae Celenae in Hispania Citerior.
- Severius Fronto, buried at Lucus Augusti in Hispania Citerior, aged fifty-five, in a tomb dedicated by his wife, Carisia Alona, buried alongside him, aged ninety.
- Severia Fuscina, a woman buried at Lugdunum with a monument dedicated by Aelius Pollio, probably her husband.
- Marcus Severius Fuscus, buried at Suessula in Campania, in a tomb dedicated by his wife, Severia Zosime.
- Severia Ɔ. l. Isia, a freedwoman buried at Rome, together with Decimus Severius Primus, probably her husband.
- Gaius Severius Julianus, dedicated a tomb at the present site of Châteauneuf-du-Rhône, formerly part of Gallia Narbonensis, to his mother, Suaduilia Julianenis.
- Publius Severius Lucanus, made an offering to a local deity at Lousonna in Germania Superior.
- Severia Marcia, dedicated a monument at Augusta Emerita in Lusitania to Severianus, probably her son, aged thirteen.
- Severius Marcianus, dedicated a monument at Aventicum in Germania Superior to his sister, Severia Martiola.
- Severia Martinula, the wife of Quintus Aquilius Lucius, a centurion in the Legio II Augusta, buried at Ancyra, in a tomb dedicated by his wife and their daughter, Aquilia Severina.
- Severia Martiola, buried at Aventicum, with a monument from her brother, Severius Marcianus.
- Marcus Severius Marcianus, buried at Nemausus, aged forty-seven, with a monument from his wife, Severia Parthenope.
- Lucius Severius Martius, one of the Seviri Augustales at Aventicum, dedicated a tomb for his wife, Valeria Secca, aged sixty-five.
- Severius Maternus, buried at the present site of Saint-Hippolyte-de-Caton, formerly part of Gallia Narbonensis, along with Titia Materna, probably his wife.
- Lucius Severius N[...], the father of Lucius and Decimus Severius Severus, who dedicated a monument to their father at the present site of Palhers, formerly part of Gallia Aquitania.
- Severia Parthenope, dedicated a tomb at Nemausus to her husband, Marcus Severius Marcianus.
- Severia Philumena, a woman buried at Lugdunum, with a monument dedicated by her heirs, Betuvius Philumenus and Tetricius Ursio.
- Severius Placidus, a soldier of the Legio VI Victrix, named in an inscription from Colonia, and another from Colonia Ulpia Trajana.
- Lucius Severius Primitivus, buried at Arelate in Gallia Narbonensis, with a monument from his wife, Quintia Beronice.
- Decimus Severius Ɔ. l. Primus, a freedman buried at Rome, together with Severia Isia, probably his wife.
- Severia Sex. f. Quartina, buried at Nemausus, with a monument from her father, Sextus Severius Quartinus.
- Sextus Severius Quartinus, dedicated a tomb at Nemausus for his daughter, Severia Quartina.
- Severia Secundina, buried at Aquae Sextiae in Gallia Narbonensis, in a tomb dedicated by her husband, Lucius Valerius Eutychion.
- Severius Seranus, made an offering to a local deity at Vicus Aquensis in Gallia Aquitania.
- Titus Severius Servandus, buried at the present site of Saint-Gervais-sur-Roubion, along with his sister, Severia, in a tomb dedicated by their mother, Patula.
- Severia Severa, the wife of Gaius Candidius Martinus, one of the Seviri Augustales, buried at Borbetomagus, in a tomb dedicated by his wife and their daughter, Martinia Dignilla.
- Severia Severa, the wife of Claudius Regulus, and mother of Tiberius Claudius Maturinus Gerontius, a young nummularius, or money changer, buried at Lugdunum, with a monument dedicated by his parents.
- Severius Severianus, made an offering to Jupiter Optimus Maximus at Rhenania Tabernae in Germania Superior.
- Lucius Severius Severianus, dedicated a tomb at Valentia in Gallia Narbonensis to his wife, Julia Marcella. Tiberius Severius, mentioned in the same inscription, might be their son.
- Severia Severina, mentioned in the sepulchral inscription of Januarius, the slave of Porcia, at Nemausus.
- Severia Severina, buried at Nemausus, along with her father-in-law, Decimus Passonus Paternus, in a tomb built by her husband, Sextus Passonus Paternus.
- Decimus Severius L. f. Severus, a son of Lucius Severius N[...], for whom he dedicated a monument in Gallia Aquitania, along with his brother, Lucius Severius Severus.
- Lucius Severius L. f. Severus, a son of Lucius Severius N[...], for whom he dedicated a monument in Gallia Aquitania, along with his brother, Decimus Severius Severus.
- Severia C. f. Valerina, buried at Lugdunum with a monument dedicated by her son, Gaius Memmius Severianus.
- Severia Verula, buried at Genava in Gallia Narbonensis, along with her mother-in-law, Julia Marcellina, in a tomb built by her husband, Julius August[...].
- Quintus Severius Verus, one of the aediles at Giufi in Africa Proconsularis.
- Marcus Severius M. f. Viator, had been a flamen at Rome and Augusta, and a quattuorvir and pontifex of the Roman colony of Reiorum Apollinares in Gallia Narbonensis. He built a tomb at Ernaginum for himself and his wife, Kareia Patercla.
- Severia Vitalis, dedicated a tomb at Dea Augusta Vocontiorum in Gallia Narbonensis, for her husband, Marcus Numisius Primus.
- Quintus Severius Vitalis, named in a sepulchral inscription from Colonia.
- Severia Zosime, dedicated a tomb at Suessula for her husband, Marcus Severius Fuscus.

== See also ==
- List of Roman gentes
- Ulpia Severina

== Bibliography ==
- Theodor Mommsen et alii, Corpus Inscriptionum Latinarum (The Body of Latin Inscriptions, abbreviated CIL), Berlin-Brandenburgische Akademie der Wissenschaften (1853–present).
- René Cagnat et alii, L'Année épigraphique (The Year in Epigraphy, abbreviated AE), Presses Universitaires de France (1888–present).
- George Davis Chase, "The Origin of Roman Praenomina", in Harvard Studies in Classical Philology, vol. VIII, pp. 103–184 (1897).
- La Carte Archéologique de la Gaule (Archaeological Map of Gaul, abbreviated CAG), Académie des Inscriptions et Belles-Lettres (1931–present).
- Luis García Iglesias, Epigrafía Romana de Augusta Emerita (Roman Epigraphy of Augusta Emerita), Madrid (1973).
- Inscriptions Latines de Narbonnaise (Latin Inscriptions from Narbonensis, abbreviated ILN), Paris (1985–2013).
- Albert Deman, Marie-Thaeraese Raepsaet-Charlier, Les inscriptions latines de Belgique (The Latin Inscriptions of Belgium, abbreviated ILB), Brussels (1985).
- Gerardo Pereira Menaut, Genma Baños Rodríguez, Corpus de Inscricións Romanas de Galicia (The Body of Roman Inscriptions of Galicia, abbreviated CIRG), Santiago (1991, 1994).
- Giovanni Battista Brusin, Inscriptiones Aquileiae (Inscriptions of Aquileia, abbreviated InscrAqu), Udine (1991–1993).
