= Bormana =

Celtic goddess

Bormana was a Celtic goddess, the female equivalent of the god Borvo (Bormanus). Bormana was worshipped alongside Bormanus as his consort.

The pair of them were, for example, worshipped at Die (Drôme) in the south of France. The goddess also occurred independently at Saint-Vulbas (Ain). Bormana was considered a goddess of water and healing. Bormana was named after the Celtic word for “to Boil”, she was associated with the 2 Hot spring baths called; Bourbon-Lancy and Bourbonne-les-Bains both named after her and her consort.
