= Nantosuelta =

Gaulish goddess

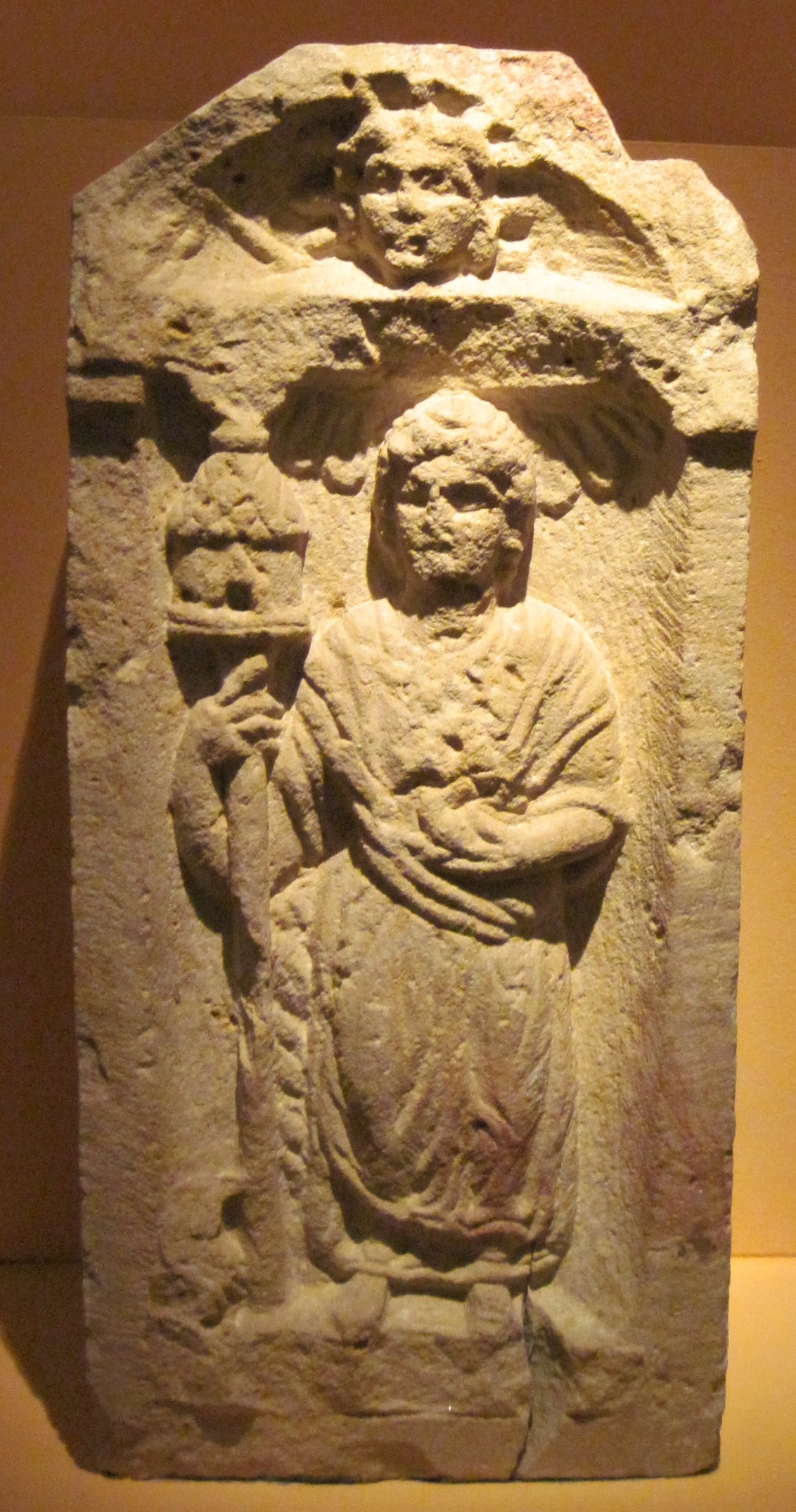
A depiction of Nantosuelta from Speyer, showing her distinctive sceptre and birds. The head of Sol can be seen in the tympanum.

Nantosuelta was an ancient Celtic goddess worshipped in Gaul, known from Gallo-Roman inscriptions and reliefs. She is most often shown as the consort of the hammer-god Sucellus, though she also appears on her own. Her characteristic emblem is a small house- or shrine-shaped object mounted on a long pole, frequently accompanied by a raven, and she is generally interpreted as a goddess of the home and of prosperity, with chthonic associations. No classical author names her, the evidence being epigraphic and iconographic and concentrated among the Mediomatrici of eastern Gaul and their neighbours.

== Name ==
The theonym is recorded in a small number of Gallo-Roman inscriptions, the best known being a dedication on an altar from Sarrebourg (Roman Pons Saravi) in the territory of the Mediomatrici, where it appears in the form Nantosueltae beside that of Sucellus. The name is not attested in classical literature, and away from the inscriptions the goddess is identified only through her attributes on Gallo-Roman reliefs.

The name is a Celtic compound. The first element, nanto- (also nantu-), is generally analysed as the Gaulish word for 'valley', which by extension also denoted a 'stream' or 'watercourse'. The second element, -suelta, is harder to interpret.

Xavier Delamarre analyses suelta as a participial form of the root swel- ('sun') and renders the whole name as 'sun-warmed valley'. Other scholars have generally glossed the name instead as 'winding brook', 'meandering river' or 'winding river', treating it as an epithet of flowing water, although the visual evidence does not obviously bear out an aquatic character. Jan de Vries saw in Nantosuelta a goddess who makes the streams glitter in the sunlight, a reading that anticipates the later connection with the sun. Pierre-Yves Lambert instead derived the first element from a root meaning 'to swim', which would give a primary sense 'flowing water'.

The element nanto- is common in Gaulish place-names, among them Nantu-ates ('those of the valley') and Diuo-nanto- ('sacred valley'), and in personal names.

== Iconography and cult ==
Nantosuelta belongs to a class of Gaulish divine couples in which both partners bear native names rather than one being given a Roman name by the interpretatio romana, the other such pairs including Borvo and Damona and Ucuetis and Bergusia. In these couples the goddess is always the indigenous partner. She appears together with Sucellus on some thirteen monuments, according to Jan de Vries, and the pair is frequent in Burgundy and southern Gaul.

The best-known image is the inscribed relief from Sarrebourg, found in 1895 near the local mithraeum. Beneath the dedication the divine pair stands in a niche. Nantosuelta, draped and long-haired, sacrifices onto an altar and holds in her other hand a long pole surmounted by a house-shaped emblem. Sucellus, a mature bearded figure in a short belted tunic and boots, carries a small round-bellied pot in his open right hand and a long-handled mallet in his left. A raven is carved below the two figures.

Nantosuelta's attributes vary. She is commonly shown with a cornucopia or a pot, emblems of plenty that she shares with the female companion of Sucellus more generally. Her diagnostic emblem, however, is the house- or shrine-shaped object mounted on a long pole, which Miranda Aldhouse-Green regards as her most distinctive symbol. This emblem, and the raven that accompanies it, are confined to the territory of the Mediomatrici and their neighbours the Treveri and Nemetes. The pole-top itself has been read in several ways: as a house or hut, as a model of a temple or shrine, as a house-shaped funerary urn, or as a beehive. On the Sarrebourg relief the object resembles a hive on which a raven perches, and three shapes heaped on the ground beside the goddess have been taken for honeycombs, which if correct would point to honey and perhaps to the fermentation of mead, in keeping with the barrels shown on some images of the couple.

The same theme recurs elsewhere in eastern Gaul and the Rhineland. On a lost relief from Speyer (Roman Noviomagus) in the land of the Nemetes the goddess again carries the house-on-pole with a raven, and a radiate head in the gable above her may point to a solar association, an attribute of Sucellus. A carving from Teting in the Moselle, among the Treveri, shows a goddess with a pot and the same house-shaped symbol. Among the Treveri around Luxembourg, a distinctive type of goddess was worshipped who was seated within a house-shaped shrine and accompanied by a raven. Although Nantosuelta usually appears with Sucellus, she also occurs alone, which is taken to show that she held an independent status rather than being merely a female counterpart of the god.

In Roman Britain the name Nantosuelta is not attested. Sucellus's name occurs on a few British objects, among them a silver ring from York. A relief from East Stoke in Nottinghamshire, in the territory of the Corieltauvi, has been tentatively identified as depicting the couple, and would be the only British image of them. Anne Ross, by contrast, held that direct evidence from Britain was lacking and that the goddess's presence there could be inferred only from indirect traces.

== Interpretation ==
=== Domestic and chthonic aspects ===
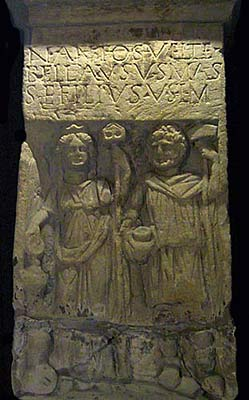
Relief of Nantosuelta and Sucellus from Sarrebourg

The house-shaped emblem has generally been taken to mark Nantosuelta as a patroness of the home and hearth, and so as a goddess of domestic prosperity. The pot and the cornucopia point the same way, Paul-Marie Duval reading the pot (olla) that Sucellus offers as a Celtic equivalent of the cornucopia and a symbol of plenty.

A second reading of the same monuments gives the goddess a chthonic character, turning on the house-symbol and on the raven. Paul-Marie Duval observed that the pole-top might be a house-shaped funerary urn, in which case Nantosuelta would be a goddess of the afterlife, a role that would suit the mallet-god. Miranda Aldhouse-Green likewise saw in the raven, a carrion bird, an added chthonic dimension to an otherwise domestic goddess. Jan de Vries went further and described her as a Celtic Proserpina, the underworld being commonly regarded as a source of fertility and wealth. The two readings are not exclusive, since Celtic mother-goddesses were associated with death and the underworld as well as with fertility.

=== Raven goddess and insular parallels ===
Anne Ross gave the raven a very different weight, treating Nantosuelta as the foremost Gaulish raven-goddess and reading the bird as a symbol of war rather than of the household. On this view the name, which she rendered 'winding river', links the goddess with the Irish war-goddesses The Morrígan, Badb and Macha, who take the form of the crow or raven and are likewise bound up with water. Ross set the Sarrebourg couple beside the Irish Dagda and the Morrígan, the Dagda's club and cauldron answering to Sucellus's mallet and pot, and the raven-goddess who mates with the tribal god answering to Nantosuelta. From these parallels she argued for a shared, possibly pre-Celtic, concept of a raven-goddess concerned at once with the outcome of battle, the prognosis of evil and the procreation of mankind. This martial and prophetic character rests chiefly on the vernacular Irish material, the Gaulish images themselves carrying no overt symbolism of war.

== Epigraphy ==
Nantosuelta is securely named in a single dedication, from Sarrebourg, where her name is paired with that of Sucellus. The theonym otherwise has to be recovered from the attributes of the goddess on uninscribed reliefs.

| Text | Find-spot | Divine name(s) | Translation | Reference | Comments |
|---|---|---|---|---|---|
| Deo Sucello Nantosuelt(a)e Bellausus Massae filius v(otum) s(olvit) l(ibens) m(erito) | Sarrebourg (Pons Saravi), Moselle | Sucellus, Nantosuelta | To the god Sucellus (and) to Nantosuelta, Bellausus, son of Massa, fulfilled his vow willingly and deservedly. | CIL XIII, 4542 | On an altar found in 1895 near the Sarrebourg mithraeum, carrying a relief of the divine couple with a raven beneath. In the territory of the Mediomatrici in Gallia Belgica. |
