= Arboretum de Montmorency =

Arboretum in France

Coordinates: 47.95°N 5.75°E

The Arboretum de Montmorency (3 hectares) is an arboretum located on Allée de Montmorency, Bourbonne-les-Bains, Haute-Marne, Champagne-Ardenne, France. It is open daily without charge.

The arboretum is laid out as an English park, and contains 250 species of trees and shrubs from around the world, including 90 species of conifers and 95 species of deciduous trees. Notable specimens include European black pine, Ginkgo biloba, Jeffrey pine, Judas tree, Lebanon cedar, northern red oak, sequoia.

== See also ==
- List of botanical gardens in France
