= Vosegus =

Roman name for the Celtic god of hunting and forestation

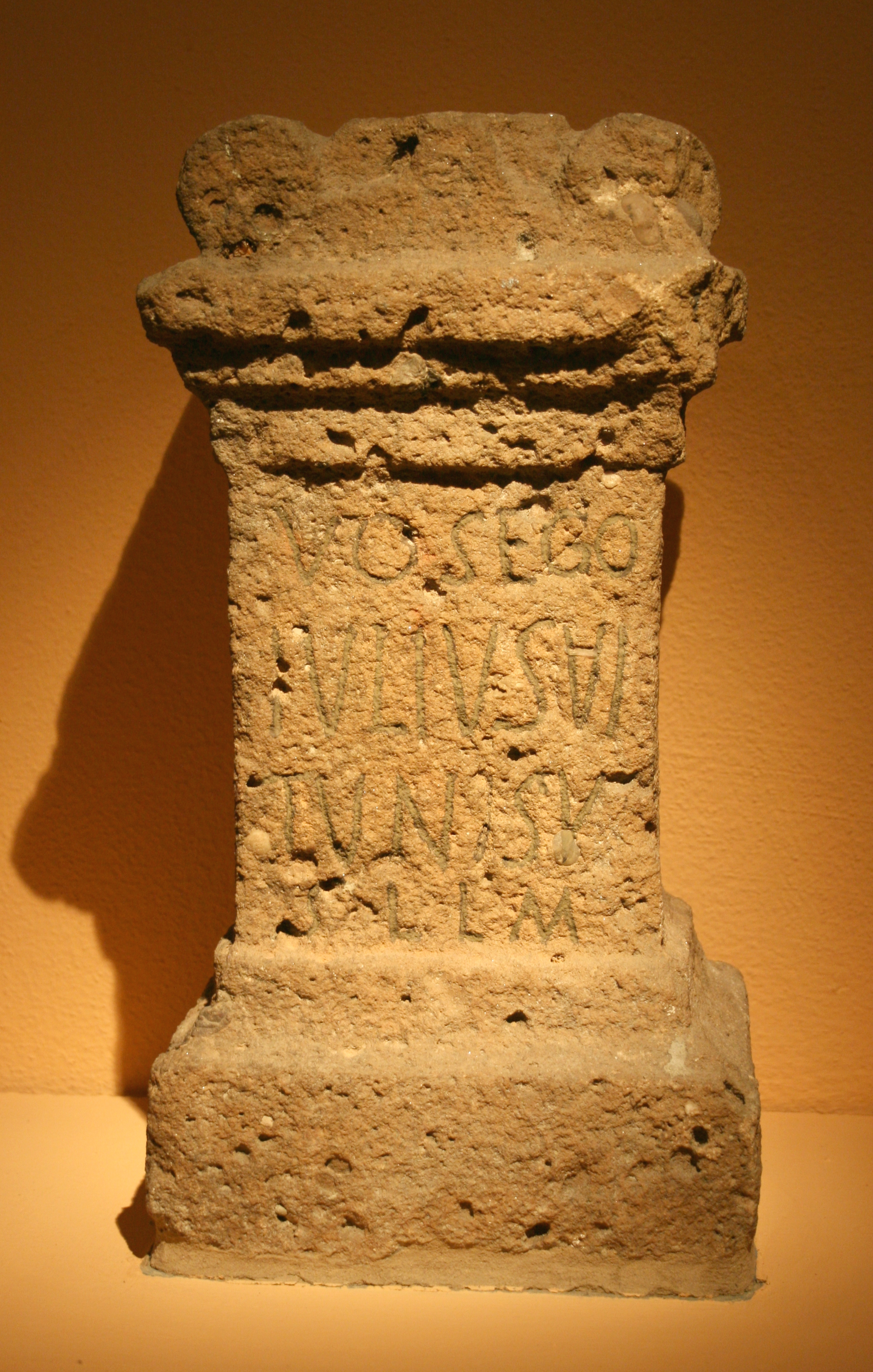
Votive stone for Vosegus (AD 151–230); the text reads Vosego / Iulius Vi/tunis v(otum) / s(olvit) l(ibens) l(aetus) m(erito) ("To Vosegus, Julius Vitunis discharges the vow freely and happily, as is deserved".")

Vosegus (Latin: [ˈwɔ.sɛ.ɡʊs]; sometimes Vosagus, Vosacius, Vosagō, Vosegō, Vogesus) was a name used in the Roman Empire for a Celtic god of hunting and forestation.

== Description and history ==
On the rare representations that have come down to us, Vosegus is represented with a bow and a shield, and he is sometimes accompanied by a dog. He is also associated with a local hunting deity with a piglet under his arm, and sometimes associated with nuts, acorns, and pine cones. The central area where Vosegus was worshiped was around the Donon. On top of a hill there was a temple dedicated to Vosegus.

The name is derived from the Proto-Celtic *uɸo- (“sub-, under”) and *segos (“force, victory”).

Later in Gallo-Roman religion, Vosegus was the patron god of the Vosges in eastern Gaul. His name is attested in about five inscriptions from western Germany and eastern France, twice in the form Vosego Silv(estri) and once as Merc(urio) Vos(ego).
