= Sucellus =

Gaulish hammer god

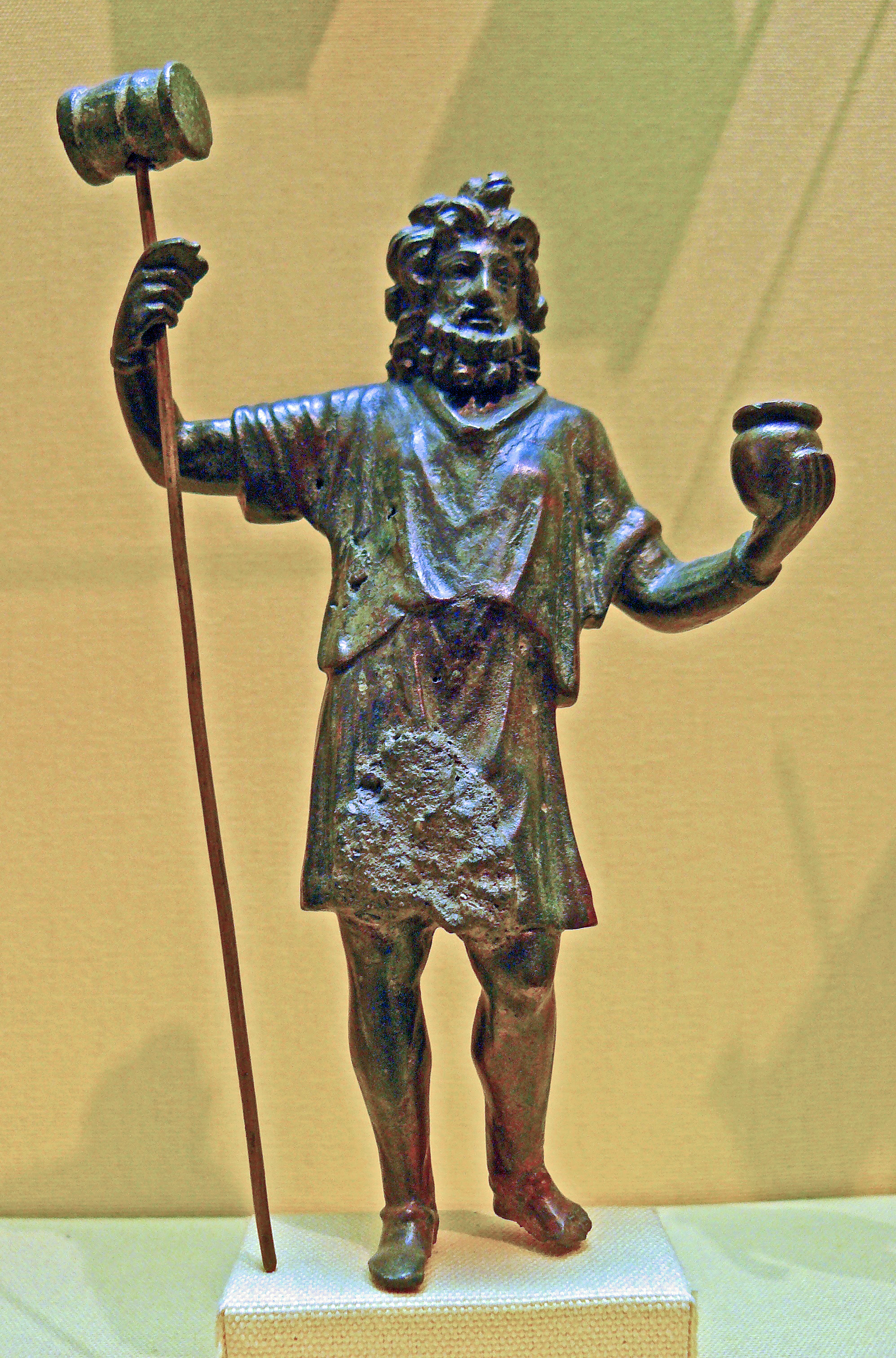
The Celtic god Sucellus with his characteristic hammer and olla. Musee National d'Archeology.

Sucellus (Gaulish, generally 'the good striker') was a god worshipped in Roman Gaul and the neighbouring provinces, known from a small number of votive inscriptions and from a large body of images. He is shown as a mature bearded man in Gaulish dress, holding a long-handled hammer or mallet in one hand and a round-bellied pot (olla) in the other, and is commonly identified with the otherwise unnamed 'hammer god' of Gaulish iconography. His cult is concentrated in the valleys of the Rhône and Saône, with scattered attestations reaching the Rhineland, Roman Britain and the Danube. On several monuments he is paired with the goddess Nantosuelta. His attributes align him with the Roman Silvanus, and modern scholars have read him variously as a god of natural abundance and fertility or as a god of the underworld, though his character remains disputed.

== Name ==
Sucellus is known only from Latin inscriptions, in which the name appears in the dative Sucello, with the variant spellings Sucelus and Sucaelus. It does not occur in classical literature. Bernhard Maier counts about ten votive dedications bearing the name, from southern Gaul, Switzerland, the German provinces, Gallia Belgica and Roman Britain. Further occurrences take the form of a moulded motto on samian ware and of personal names.

The name is generally analysed as the Gaulish prefix su- ('good, well') joined to a stem -cellos, taken to continue a root *kel-d- ('to strike'), formed like Latin percellere ('to strike') and comparable to Lithuanian kalti ('to forge'). It is rendered 'the good striker' or 'he who has a good hammer'. On this reading the name refers directly to the god's hammer. Blanca María Prósper instead takes the second element to be verbal and derives the name from *su-kel-mn-o-, from a root *kel- ('to protect'), so that it would mean 'providing good protection'. (Note: Prósper compares the Sanskrit divine name Su-śarman-, and observes that if the Old Irish word soichell ('generosity, kindness') is a cognate, the traditional etymology cannot stand.)

The form Sucaelus, on an altar from Mainz dedicated to Jupiter (I O M Sucaelo), is treated by Bernhard Maier as a mere spelling of Sucellus. Jan de Vries read it instead as a deliberate reshaping of the name towards Latin caelum ('sky, heaven'), suited to the Jupiter dedication, while Xavier Delamarre keeps a separate name Su-caelus ('good omen') apart from Su-cellos. The same stem appears in personal names across the Celtic-speaking world, so that the theonym has to be distinguished from homonymous individuals. For instance a girl is named Sucella on a tombstone from Noricum and one man is called Cn(aeus) Sucellius on a stamp from Carnuntum.

== Iconography ==
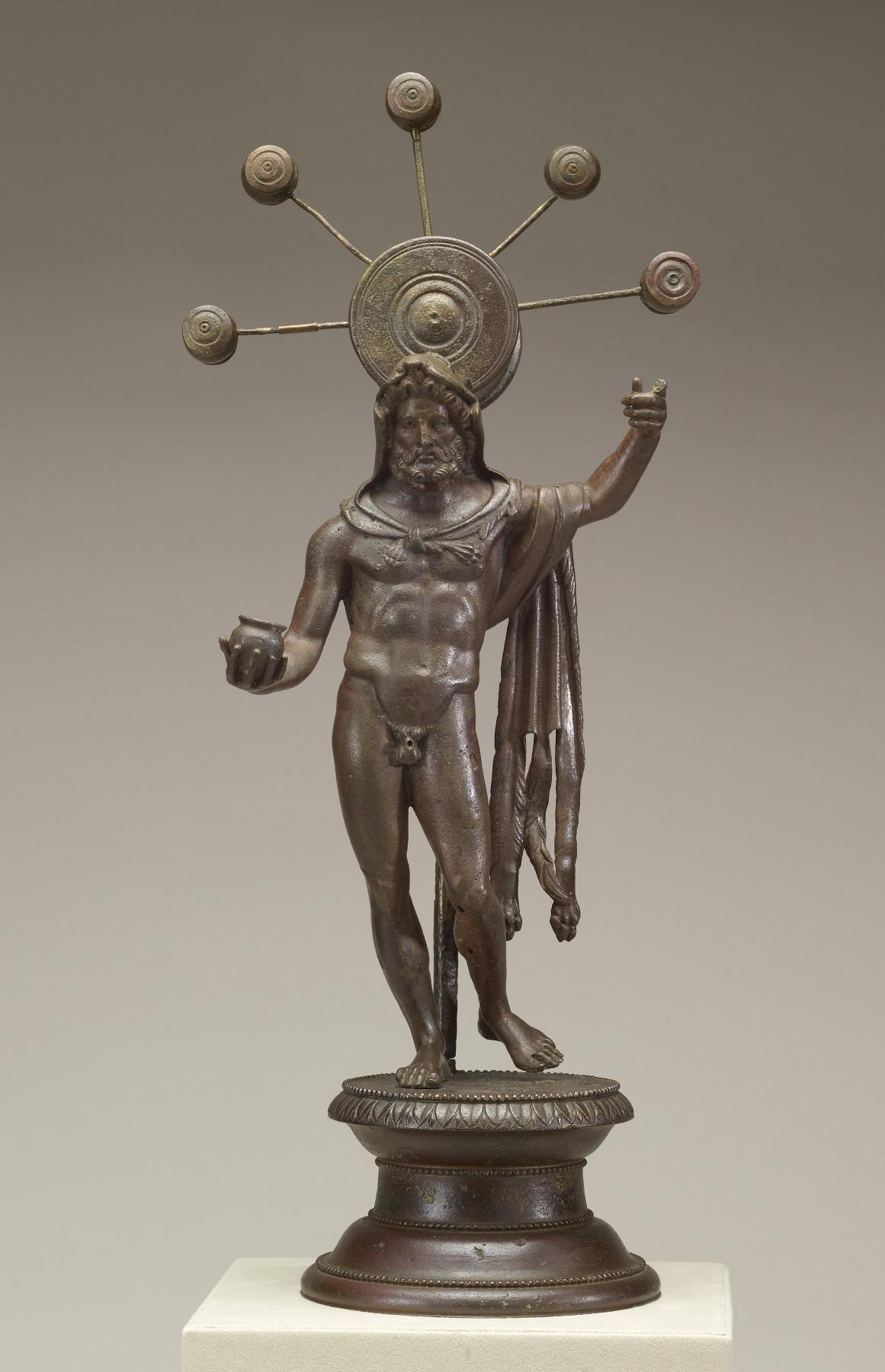
This statue of Sucellus is the earliest known likeness of the god (ca. 1st century AD). It is from a Roman home in France and was found in a household shrine (lararium). Walters Art Museum, Baltimore.

Jan de Vries reckoned about two hundred monuments of the 'hammer god' as a type, and Bernhard Maier put at well over a hundred the sculptures and bronze statuettes that have been referred to Sucellus himself, most of them from the valleys of the Saône and the Rhône. The god is depicted as a mature, bearded man, with curling hair and beard, dressed in the manner of a Gaul in a short belted tunic, with a hood and breeches or boots, unlike the unclothed gods of the Mediterranean. In one hand, usually the left, he holds a long-handled hammer or mallet, sometimes as tall as a sceptre and resting on the ground, and in the other a round-bellied pot without a handle, the olla.

Other objects occur in place of the pot, among them a sickle, a knife, a sword, a club or a purse, and more rarely a set of pan-pipes. One or two Gaulish barrels and a wine amphora are sometimes set beside him, and his tunic is on occasion strewn with signs that have been read as astral symbols. A dog frequently accompanies the god, and on a few monuments it is three-headed, as at Ober-Seebach in Alsace and at Várhely in Dacia, while in the region of Nîmes he appears with a dog and a snake. A raven is present on some monuments, including the Sarrebourg altar.

The imagery of the named monuments has allowed a large group of otherwise anonymous 'hammer god' images to be identified with Sucellus. Henri Hubert placed these images east of a line running from the Lower Rhine through Reims and the Allier valley to Saint-Gilles, which is also the area in which Silvanus was particularly venerated. Miranda Aldhouse-Green locates the concentration of the hammer god in Burgundy, the Rhône valley and Provence.

On a number of monuments Sucellus is paired with a goddess, most often one holding a cornucopia. Jan de Vries counted thirteen monuments on which he appears with the goddess Nantosuelta. The clearest is an altar found in 1895 near the Mithraeum at Sarrebourg, close to Metz, which carries the dedication DEO SVCELLO NANTOSVELTE and shows the pair standing side by side, with a raven beneath them. Nantosuelta usually holds a cornucopia, but among the Mediomatrici she is shown with a small round house on a pole, taken to mark her domestic character. Springs at Beire-le-Château and Antigny-la-Ville in Burgundy were placed under his protection, and the source of the river Arroux is said to have been presided over by Sucellus. The dedicators known by name generally belong to civilian, unpretentious circles, a point that has weighed in the interpretation of the god.

== Interpretation ==
The mallet and the pot also appear on monuments of the Roman Silvanus, and in Gallia Narbonensis, where Sucellus has no dedication of his own. He seems to merge with that god, who is shown there with his attributes. Paul-Marie Duval read this assimilation as revealing a god of nature, particularly of wild and cultivated vegetation, of forests and their creatures and of plantations and their produce. On two dedications, from Worms and from Augst, the god is named Sucellus Silvanus.

The fullest single monument is a stone statue from Javols, in the territory of the Gabales, over 1.7 m high and so far larger than the usual statuettes and reliefs. It shows the god in Gaulish dress with a cornucopia, barrels, an amphora, a vine and a dog, and carries on its back a set of woodworking tools. Jean-Claude Béal and Pierre Peyre read it as a Silvanus-Sucellus set up in a hall used by a guild of craftsmen, and dated it to the late 1st or early 2nd century AD. Jean-Jacques Hatt added Liber Pater to the identification, tied the statue to the wine trade and to a Nîmes dedication to Silvanus and Liber Pater, and placed it instead in the middle or second half of the 2nd century.

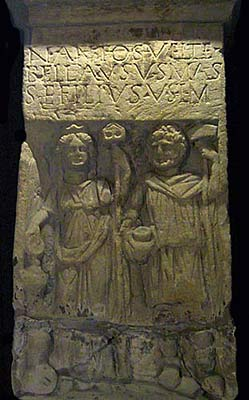
Relief of Nantosuelta and Sucellus from Sarrebourg. Now in the Museums of Metz.

Duval saw Sucellus as a dispenser of food, the pot in his open hand standing as a Celtic equivalent of the cornucopia, and the barrels and amphora beside him as symbols of plenty. Miranda Aldhouse-Green connected the god with fertility and in particular with the grape harvest, symbolised by the pot and the barrel, and suggested that the hammer might figure the striking of the earth to wake it after winter, or serve to ward off disease and famine. De Vries, noting that his worshippers were humble people, concluded that he was above all a god of everyday abundance, granting fertility to the field, the byre and the household.

The hammer has also been read as a symbol of death. De Vries gathered folklore in which a hammer is placed in a coffin or held over the dying, and recalled that the Etruscan death-demon Charun carries a hammer, a parallel that several scholars have drawn. The three-headed dog on some monuments, and the pairing of the god with Aericura or Proserpina on altars in the Karlsruhe area, have suggested a god of the underworld, and he has been identified with Dis Pater, the deity from whom, according to Caesar, the Gauls claimed descent. Both de Vries and Duval treated this identification with caution. Duval observed that Sucellus was never openly assimilated to Dis Pater and that the paternal character central to that figure is not attested for him, and de Vries held that the underworld traces do not warrant the equation. Giulia Baratta likewise rejected the equation, pointing to a relief from Sulzbach whose inscription names Dis Pater and Aericura but whose seated couple lacks the mallet, the pot, the dog and the other attributes of Sucellus.

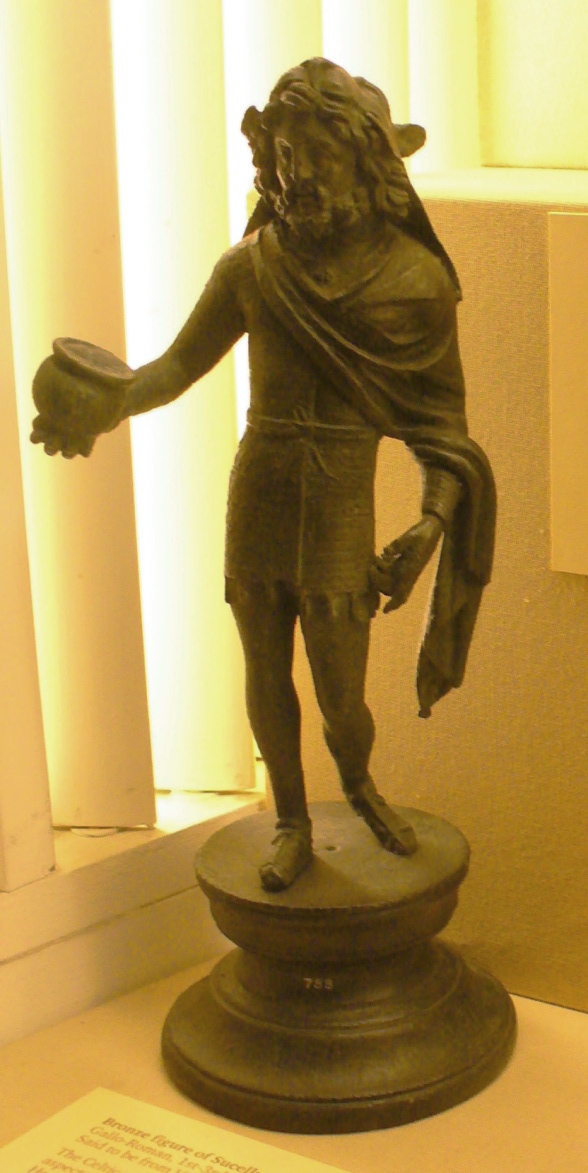
Bronze statue of Sucellus from Vienne.

Because the Irish Dagda, the 'good god' surnamed Ollathair ('father of all'), carries a club that kills at one end and revives at the other, together with an inexhaustible cauldron, some scholars have seen in Sucellus a Gaulish counterpart of that figure. De Vries judged the resemblance superficial, observing that the club is only exceptionally shown, that it appears borrowed from depictions of Hercules, and that the small pot is not to be equated with the mythical cauldron of plenty. The hair and beard of Sucellus resemble most closely those of Jupiter, and the Mainz altar to I O M Sucaelo has been taken to point to a connection with the sky god, though de Vries doubted that this made him a Jupiter figure. Pierre Lambrechts went furthest, treating Sucellus as the supreme god of Gaulish religion, patron of men, houses and crops and god of wealth, sky, thunder and death, a reconstruction that de Vries rejected as incompatible with the modest figure of the monuments.

Bernard Sergent placed the mallet and the wooden objects at the centre of his reading, taking Sucellus to be above all a god of woodworking who, in the Gallo-Roman period, came to specialise in cooperage, the making of barrels. On this account the pot and the cup hold the wine that the barrels contained, and the god's link with the vine is secondary to his craft. Sergent compared him with the Irish carpenter Luchta, one of the craftsman-gods of the Tuatha Dé Danann, who alone makes the bent-wood shields of early Ireland, and, beyond the Celtic world, with the Indian artisan-god Viśvakarman, another master of curved-wood objects. He further connected the god with a Hispano-Celtic name Louterd, read as *Lukteros and taken to be the older name of the woodworking god later called Sucellos, 'the good striker'.

== Epigraphy ==
Sucellus is named in a small group of Latin inscriptions, most of them from central and eastern Gaul and the German provinces, with outliers in Britain and Dacia. In most the god is invoked in his own right, at Worms and Augst as Sucellus Silvanus, and at Mainz, in the variant Sucaelus, as a byname of Jupiter.

The name is spelled with a single l in only two dedications, at Worms and at York. The York ring is the only secure attestation of the cult in Britain. An oolite altar from Chedworth carries a spear-and-axe figure that Fritz Heichelheim took for Sucellus, though its short text is read as a dedication to Lenus Mars. Martin Henig doubted that it can be read with any certainty. A small sandstone altar in the Vindolanda Museum, inscribed Deo Sucel(o) is taken to be a modern forgery. The figure on it is a warrior with a shield and a lance rather than the mallet-god, and its rare single-l spelling is apparently copied from the two genuine dedications that use it.

Text	Find-spot	Divine name(s)	Translation	Reference	Comments
Deo Sucello Nantosuelt(a)e Bellausus Massae filius v(otum) s(olvit) l(ibens) m(erito)	Sarrebourg (Pons Saravi), Gallia Belgica	Sucellus, Nantosuelta	To the god Sucellus (and) Nantosuelta, Bellausus son of Massa paid his vow willingly and deservedly	CIL XIII, 4542	Relief of the divine couple below the text, with a raven. Found near the Mithraeum in 1895
Deo Sucello Gellia Iucund[a] v(otum) s(olvit) l(ibens) m(erito)	Vienne (Vienna), Gallia Narbonensis	Sucellus	To the god Sucellus, Gellia Iucunda paid her vow willingly and deservedly	CIL XII, 1836	
Sucello Ipadco v(otum) s(olvit) l(ibens) m(erito)	Yverdon-les-Bains (Eburodunum), Germania Superior	Sucellus	To Sucellus, the vow paid willingly and deservedly	CIL XIII, 5057	Ipadco: dedicator's name or a byname, uncertain
Deo Sucel(l)o Silvano Ti(berius) [...]	Worms (Borbetomagus), Germania Superior	Sucellus (Silvanus)	To the god Sucellus Silvanus, Tiberius [...]	CIL XIII, 6224	Sucellus equated with Silvanus
In honor(em) d(omus) d(ivinae) deo Sucello Silv(ano) Spart(us?) l(ocus) d(atus) d(ecreto) d(ecurionum)	Augst (Augusta Raurica), Germania Superior	Sucellus (Silvanus)	In honour of the Divine House, to the god Sucellus Silvanus, Spartus(?). The site given by decree of the decurions	AE 1925, 5	Finke 134. Dated to the 2nd century AD
I(ovi) O(ptimo) M(aximo) Sucaelo [...]	Mainz (Mogontiacum), Germania Superior	Iuppiter Optimus Maximus Sucaelus	To Jupiter Best and Greatest Sucaelus, [...]	CIL XIII, 6730	The variant Sucaelus, equated with Jupiter
Sucellum propitium nobis	Vichy (Aquae Calidae), Gallia Aquitania	Sucellus	"May Sucellus be favourable to us"	ILTG 497	Moulded motto on samian ware. The same formula occurs at Orange, Amiens and Sainte-Colombe
Deo Sucello	Metz (Divodurum), Gallia Belgica, at Frescaty	Sucellus	To the god Sucellus	ILTG 565	Finke 87. Engraved on a bronze finger-ring, a private object
Deo Sucello aream Resus Torogilli v(otum) s(olvit) l(ibens) m(erito)	Mâlain (Mediolanum), Gallia Lugdunensis	Sucellus	To the god Sucellus, Resus son of Torogillus (gave) the precinct(?), paying his vow willingly and deservedly	ILingons 31	Territory of the Lingones
Deo Sucelo	York (Eboracum), Britannia	Sucellus	To the god Sucellus	RIB 2422.21	Octagonal silver finger-ring, found in the city ditch in 1875 (Yorkshire Museum) (Note: John Koch reports the York ring as also inscribed Tot(atis) Martis, which would connect Sucellus with Mars Toutatis. RIB records only the Sucellus text, the two readings being entered separately in the Ephemeris Epigraphica.)
[D(eo)] Suc(ello?) pro salute M(arci) Sedat(i) Severiani leg(ati) Aug(usti)	Mehadia (Ad Mediam), Dacia	Sucellus(?)	To the god Sucellus(?), for the well-being of Marcus Sedatius Severianus, imperial legate	CIL III, 1575	IDR III.1, 70. Dated to AD 151–153. The theonym is a restoration
