= Damona =

Gaulish healing goddess

Damona was a goddess worshipped in Roman Gaul, attested only by Latin votive inscriptions of the Roman period. The dedications come from the thermal-spring sanctuaries of eastern-central Gaul, chiefly in what is now Burgundy, where she was honoured as a healing goddess of the curative waters. She appears most often as the consort of the spring-god Borvo, but is also paired with the god Albius and with Apollo Moritasgus, and she is attested on her own.

== Name ==
The name Damona is transmitted only in Latin inscriptions, and no ancient author mentions the goddess. It is generally derived from a Celtic word *damo-, associated with several bovids and cervids in descendant languages (cf. Old Irish dam 'ox, deer', damán 'fawn'; also *damato- > Middle Welsh dafad 'sheep', Old Cornish dauat 'ewe'). The stem is usually traced to Proto-Indo-European *dm̥h₂o- ('the tamed one'), which in various languages gave the name of the young bovid (Skt. damya- 'young bull to be tamed', Grk damalis 'heifer', Alb. dem 'bull, steer'). (Note: The Latin noun damma, which is the source of French daim ('roe'), is probably a loanword from Gaulish.) The final element -ona is a common theonymic suffix that recurs in Gaulish divine names, as in Epona, Matrona, Sirona and Nemetona.

The precise meaning of the underlying stem varies between authors. Xavier Delamarre glosses the Gaulish stem damo- as 'ox, stag'. Ranko Matasović interprets Celtic *damo- as 'bull'. Miranda Aldhouse-Green renders the name Damona as 'divine cow' or 'great cow', while John T. Koch gives 'great or divine ox'. Jan de Vries cautioned that the connection with Irish dam ('ox, deer') is a purely linguistic one, and that it does little to explain the character of the goddess.

== Cult ==
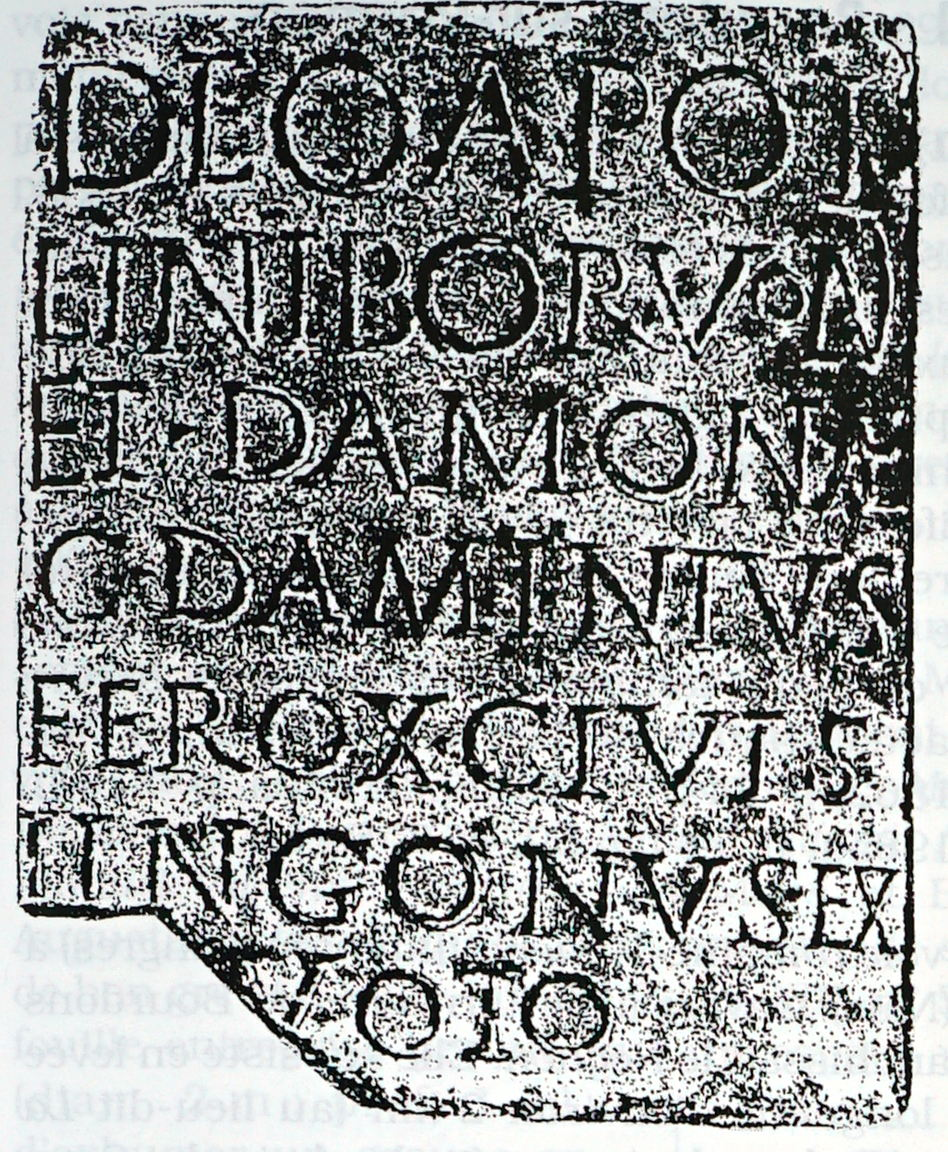
Dedication to Borvo and Damona

Damona belongs to the group of Gaulish goddesses of the healing springs. At every site where she is named the setting is a curative sanctuary attached to thermal or mineral waters. At Bourbon-Lancy the god paired with her keeps his Celtic name, as Borvo or Bormo, whereas at Bourbonne-les-Bains several dedications style him Apollo Borvo. In either case Damona keeps her Celtic name, the usual pattern in such pairs, where the goddess retains the native name while the god may take a Roman one.

Alhouse-Green regards Alesia as Damona's principal sanctuary, where she was worshipped with Apollo Moritasgus at a precinct that enclosed sacred springs and baths in which the sick bathed in hope of a cure. No image of Moritasgus survives, but a fragment of Damona's cult statue was recovered there: a carved stone head crowned with ears of corn, together with a left hand around which a serpent is coiled. These attributes, the corn and the snake, mark her at once as a goddess of healing and of fertility or plenty. Alhouse-Green further connects one of the dedications from the sanctuary at Bourbon-Lancy with incubation, the ritual sleep in which a pilgrim sought a healing dream or vision from the god.

== Interpretation ==
The range of Damona's partners, together with the dedications to her alone, has been taken as a sign that she was an independent deity in her own right, whose identity did not depend on her association with any single god. Her healing role and her attributes place her close to the goddess Sirona, who is likewise shown with ears of corn and a snake and likewise paired with a spring- or healing-god. On the strength of the snake and the ears of grain, her attributes have been compared with those of the Greek figures Hygieia and Demeter respectively. De Vries stressed that although the bovine etymology of the name is secure enough, it reveals little about the nature or function of the goddess herself.

== Epigraphy ==
Damona is named in a series of Latin dedications of the Roman period, concentrated in eastern-central Gaul. The largest groups come from the curative spring-sites of Bourbon-Lancy (Saône-et-Loire) and Bourbonne-les-Bains (Haute-Marne), the latter in the territory of the Lingones. At both she is the partner of the spring-god Borvo. She is joined by the god Albius on a bronze vessel from Chassenay, near Arnay-le-Duc (Côte-d'Or), and by Apollo Moritasgus at Alesia (Alise-Sainte-Reine). At Bourbonne-les-Bains, and again at Rivières in the Charente, she was worshipped alone, without a male partner.

| Text | Find-spot | Divine name(s) | Translation | Reference | Comments |
|---|---|---|---|---|---|
| C(aius) Iulius Eporedirigis f(ilius) Magnus pro L(ucio) Iulio Caleno filio Bormoni et Damonae vot(um) sol(vit) | Bourbon-Lancy (Saône-et-Loire) | Bormo, Damona | Gaius Iulius Magnus, son of Eporedirix, on behalf of his son Lucius Iulius Calenus, fulfilled his vow to Bormo and Damona. | CIL XIII, 2805 | The god is named Bormo. |
| Borvoni et Damonae T(itus) Severius Modestus [...] | Bourbon-Lancy (Saône-et-Loire) | Borvo, Damona | To Borvo and Damona, Titus Severius Modestus ... | CIL XIII, 2806 | The god's name is spelt Borvo. |
| [Num(inibus) pr]aest(antissimis) sac(rum) [...] [b]asilica v[etustate collapsa] [deo B]orvoni et [Damonae ...] | Bourbon-Lancy (Saône-et-Loire) | (Borvo), Damona | Sacred to the most excellent divine powers ... a basilica ... to the god Borvo and Damona ... | CIL XIII, 2807 | Fragmentary. Records work on a basilica at the sanctuary. The restoration vetustate collapsa ('collapsed through age') is uncertain. |
| [praestanti]ssimis nu[minibus] deo Bo[rvoni et Damonae] | Bourbon-Lancy (Saône-et-Loire) | (Borvo), (Damona) | To the most excellent divine powers, to the god Borvo and Damona ... | CIL XIII, 2808 | Fragmentary and largely restored. |
| Deo Apollini Borvoni et Damonae [...] | Bourbonne-les-Bains (Haute-Marne) | Apollo Borvo, Damona | To the god Apollo Borvo and Damona ... | CIL XIII, 5911 | Borvo receives the interpretatio romana as Apollo. |
| Deo Borvoni et Damon(ae) [...] | Bourbonne-les-Bains (Haute-Marne) | Borvo, Damona | To the god Borvo and Damona ... | CIL XIII, 5918 | |
| Borvoni et Damonae [...] | Bourbonne-les-Bains (Haute-Marne) | Borvo, Damona | To Borvo and Damona ... | CIL XIII, 5919 | |
| Deo Borvo(ni) et Damone [...] | Bourbonne-les-Bains (Haute-Marne) | Borvo, Damona | To the god Borvo and Damona ... | CIL XIII, 5920 | The goddess's name is spelt Damone. Koch reads the god's name as Borvo(ni?). |
| Damonae Aug(ustae) [...] | Bourbonne-les-Bains (Haute-Marne) | Damona | To Damona Augusta ... | CIL XIII, 5921 | Addressed to Damona alone, with the imperial title Augusta. |
| Deo Albio et Damonae [...] | Chassenay, near Arnay-le-Duc (Côte-d'Or) | Albius, Damona | To the god Albius and Damona ... | CIL XIII, 2840 | Incised on a bronze vessel. Re-edited as CIL XIII 11233. |
| Deo Apollini Moritasg(o) et Damonae [...] | Alesia (Alise-Sainte-Reine, Côte-d'Or) | Apollo Moritasgus, Damona | To the god Apollo Moritasgus and Damona ... | AE 1965, 181 | From the spring sanctuary of Apollo Moritasgus. |
