= Gebrinius =

Celtic version of the god Mercury

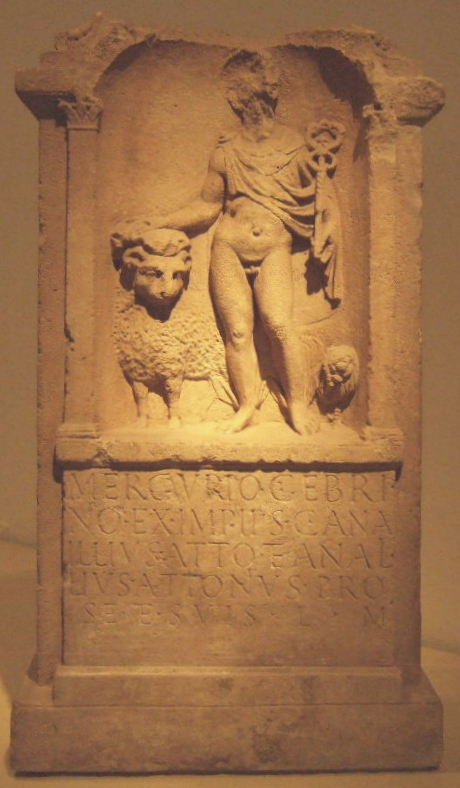
Altar of Mercurius Gebrinius, Bonn

Gebrinius is a local Celtic version of the god Mercury. In the 2nd century AD, an altar was set up at Bonn to honour him. The stone depicts the god in full Roman aspect, but is, nevertheless, dedicated to "Mercury Gebrinius", perhaps of the name of a local divinity of the Ubii, whose cult was linked to that of the Roman god.
