= DBApparel =

French lingerie manufacturing group

- Founded: 23 September 2005; 20 years ago
- Website: www.dbapparel.com

DBApparel, also known as DBA, is a group of companies who manufacture well-known brands of clothing (lingerie), and is based in France.

The company was formed on 23 September 2005 initially in the 2nd arrondissement of Paris. In 2006 it moved to Levallois-Perret.

== Structure ==
Paul Devin is Managing Director of DBApparel UK (DBA UK), based in Surrey. In 2014, the entire company had around 6,200 employees. DBA is headquartered in Rueil-Malmaison, in the west of Paris, in the Hauts-de-Seine department, where it has been since 2010. The headquarters is situated near Rueil-Malmaison station, the River Seine and the A86 autoroute (Paris ring-road) near the D186 junction.

The Finance Director of the company is Marcel Nardelli. As at 2019, DBApparel is now a part of Hanesbrands Inc.

== Products ==
It sells men's and women's underwear, also known as innerwear. For lingerie, it is the market leader in France and Spain, and number two in Italy. It is the market leader for hosiery in France and Germany. It sells underwear in 16 countries.

== Subsidiaries ==
- Playtex
- Wonderbra
- Abanderado - Spain
- Lovable - lingerie brand in Italy
- Nur Die - hosiery brand in Germany
- Shock Absorber - sports bra brand
- Dim (lingerie) - hosiery and lingerie

== See also ==
- Triumph International
