= Jan de Vries =

Jan de Vries may refer to:

- Jan de Vries (philologist) (1890–1964), Dutch scholar of Germanic linguistics, literature and religion
- Jan de Vries (athlete) (1896–1939), Dutch athlete who won a bronze medal at the 1924 Summer Olympics in the 4 x 100 metre relay
- Jan de Vries (soldier) (1924–2012), a Canadian World War II paratrooper and veteran's advocate
- Jan de Vries (historian) (born 1943), American professor of economic history
- Jan de Vries (motorcyclist) (1944–2021), two-time 50cc Grand Prix motorcycle racing World Champion
- Jan de Vries (footballer) (1944–2024), Dutch footballer
