= Borvo =

Ancient Celtic god of healing springs

Borvo, also Bormo, was an ancient Celtic god of thermal and healing springs. His cult is attested across a wide area of Roman Gaul and reached the northwest of the Iberian Peninsula. Under the interpretatio romana he was usually identified with Apollo, and at Aix-en-Provence instead with Hercules. His most frequent divine partner was the goddess Damona.

== Name ==
The Gaulish theonym Boruō means 'hot spring', 'warm source'. It stems from the Proto-Celtic verbal root berw- ('boil, brew'; cf. Old Irish berbaid, Middle Welsh berwi), itself from Proto-Indo-European bʰerw- ('boil, brew'; cf. Latin ferueō 'to be intensely hot, boil', Sanskrit bhurváni 'agitated, wild'). An Bhearú (River Barrow) in Ireland has also been linked to this Celtic root.

The variant Bormō could have emerged from a difference in suffixes or from dissimilation. Known derivates include Bormanicus (Caldas de Vizela), from an earlier Borwānicos, and Bormanus or Borbanus (Aix-en-Diois, Aix-en-Provence), from an earlier Borwānos. A goddess named Boruoboendoa, perhaps reflecting the Gaulish theonym Buruo-bouinduā or Buruo-bō-uinduā, has also been found in Utrecht.

Numerous toponyms of settlements linked to springs are derived from Borvo or Bormo, including Bourbon, Bourbonne, Boulbon, Bormes, Bourbriac, La Bourboule and Worms. The names of various small rivers in France, such as Bourbouillon, Bourban, and Bourbière, also stem from the theonym.

== Cult ==
=== Attestations ===
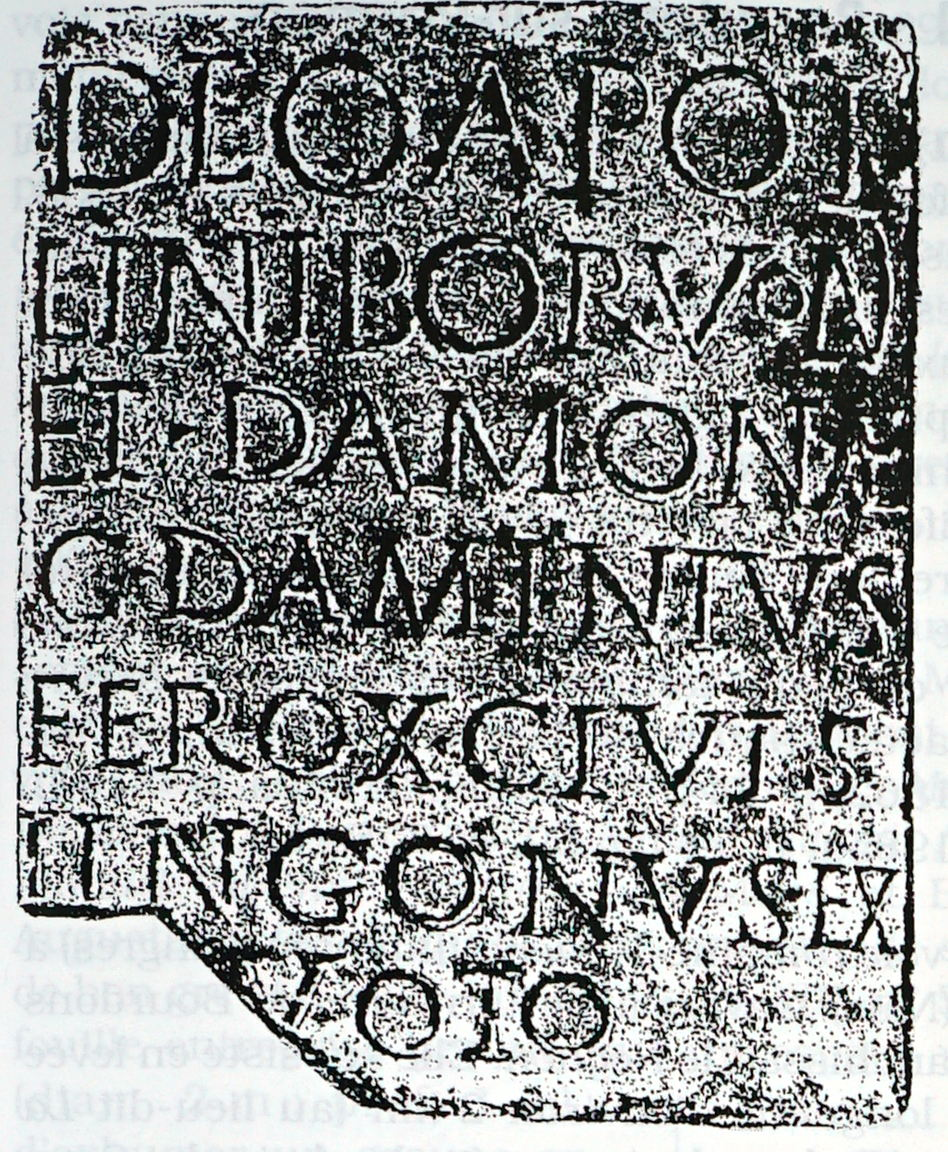
Dedication to Borvo and Damona

Borvo is generally interpreted as a god of the warm, welling waters of thermal springs, which were held to be curative. The evidence for his worship is almost entirely epigraphic, in the form of votive dedications set up at Gallo-Roman spa sites.

Under the interpretatio romana, Borvo was widely equated with Apollo in his function as a god of healing. The equation is recorded on dedications, among them one to Apollo Borvo and Damona from Bourbonne-les-Bains. At Aix-en-Provence he appears as Hercules instead of Apollo.

Two figured images of the god are known. A relief from Entrains shows him with a goblet, a money bag and a plate of fruit, features that have been taken to mark a god of plenty and wealth. A relief from Vichy shows him seated naked on a rock, holding a cup from which liquid bubbles over.

The main centres of the cult lay in central and eastern Gaul. Foremost among them were the spa towns of Bourbonne-les-Bains, in the territory of the Lingones, and Bourbon-Lancy. Further dedications come from Entrains and Aix-les-Bains. The Roman-period place-name Aquae Bormonis, entered on the Tabula Peutingeriana, is formed from the god's name. Whether it denotes Bourbon-Lancy or Bourbon-l'Archambault is disputed. Émile Thevenot held the question to be undecidable, since both were spa sites in the Gallo-Roman period, though recent scholarship generally favours Bourbon-Lancy, from which four dedications to the god and to Damona survive, while none has yet come to light at Bourbon-l'Archambault. (Note: The four dedications are CIL XIII 2805–2808, which name the god as Bormo or Borvo together with Damona.)

=== Consorts ===
Borvo's usual divine partner was the goddess Damona, whose name derives from a Celtic word for cattle (compare Old Irish dam 'ox, cow') and has been read as 'divine cow'. She is paired with him at Bourbonne-les-Bains and Bourbon-Lancy. Damona was not confined to Borvo, as she also appears beside other gods (Moritasgus and Albius) and received dedications in her own right. Like Borvo she was a deity of curative waters.

Where the god bears the name Bormanus, as at Die and Aix-en-Diois, his partner is instead the goddess Bormana. Bormana was also worshipped alone, for example at Saint-Vulbas.

== Epigraphy ==
Borvo is known almost only from Latin votive inscriptions, most of them cut on altars and set up at Gallo-Roman spa sites. The largest groups come from Bourbonne-les-Bains, in the territory of the Lingones, and from Bourbon-Lancy, where the forms Bormo and Borvo occur side by side. Several of the dedicants at Bourbonne-les-Bains describe themselves as citizens of the Lingones. At Bourbonne-les-Bains the god is once identified with Apollo.

Two altars from Caldas de Vizela, in the northwest of the Iberian Peninsula, carry the related name Bormanicus.

Text	Find-spot	Divine name(s)	Translation	Reference	Comments
C(aius) Iulius Eporedirigis f(ilius) Magnus / pro L(ucio) Iulio Caleno filio / Bormoni et Damonae / vot(um) sol(vit)	Bourbon-Lancy (Saône-et-Loire)	Bormo, Damona	To Bormo and Damona, Gaius Iulius Magnus, son of Eporedirix, on behalf of his son Lucius Iulius Calenus, discharged his vow.	CIL XIII, 2805	Discovered in 1792. The god's name has the form Bormo.
Borvoni et Damonae / T(itus) Severius Mo/destus [o]mnib(us) / h[o]n[oribus] et offi[ciis] ...	Bourbon-Lancy (Saône-et-Loire)	Borvo, Damona	To Borvo and Damona, Titus Severius Modestus, [having held] all honours and offices ...	CIL XIII, 2806	The god's name has the form Borvo. The stone is damaged and the text breaks off.
Deo Apol/lini Borvoni / et Damonae / C(aius) Daminius / Ferox civis / Lingonus ex / voto	Bourbonne-les-Bains (Haute-Marne)	Apollo Borvo, Damona	To the god Apollo Borvo and Damona, Gaius Daminius Ferox, a citizen of the Lingones, (set this up) from a vow.	CIL XIII, 5911	The god is assimilated to Apollo. The Epigraphik-Datenbank Heidelberg dates the altar to the 2nd century AD.
Borvoni et [Da]/monae C(aius) Ia/tinius Ro/manus (L)in/g(onus) pro salu/te Cocillae / fil(iae) ex voto	Bourbonne-les-Bains (Haute-Marne)	Borvo, Damona	To Borvo and Damona, Gaius Iatinius Romanus, a Lingones, for the well-being of his daughter Cocilla, from a vow.	CIL XIII, 5916	The dedication is made pro salute, for the health of the dedicant's daughter.
Damonae Aug(ustae) / Claudia Mossia et C(aius) Iul(ius) Superstes fil(ius) / l(ocus) d(atus) ex d(ecreto) d(ecurionum) v(otum) s(olverunt) l(ibentes) m(erito)	Bourbonne-les-Bains (Haute-Marne)	Damona	To Damona Augusta, Claudia Mossia and her son Gaius Iulius Superstes. The site was granted by decree of the councillors. They discharged their vow willingly and deservedly.	CIL XIII, 5921	Damona is invoked without Borvo, with the title Augusta.
Bormano / et Borman[ae] / P(ublius) Sappinius / Eusebes v(otum) s(olvit) / l(ibens) m(erito)	Aix-en-Diois (Drôme)	Bormanus, Bormana	To Bormanus and Bormana, Publius Sappinius Eusebes discharged his vow willingly and deservedly.	CIL XII, 1561	The southern form of the divine couple. Older reference works cite the inscription as CIL XII 1567.
Bormanae Aug(ustae) sacr(um) ...	Saint-Vulbas (Ain)	Bormana	Sacred to Bormana Augusta ...	CIL XIII, 2452	Bormana is invoked alone, with the title Augusta.

== Bibliography ==
- Busse, Peter E.; aan de Wiel, Caroline (2006). "Borvo/Bormo/Bormanus". In Koch, John T. (ed.). Celtic Culture: A Historical Encyclopedia. Santa Barbara: ABC-CLIO. pp. 230–231. ISBN 978-1-85109-440-0.
- Charrière, Georges (1975). "La femme et l'équidé dans la mythologie française". Revue de l'histoire des religions. 188 (2): 129–188. doi:10.3406/rhr.1975.6132. ISSN 0035-1423. JSTOR 23668651.
- Delamarre, Xavier (2003). Dictionnaire de la langue gauloise: Une approche linguistique du vieux-celtique continental. Errance. ISBN 9782877723695.
- de Vries, Jan (1961). Keltische Religion. Die Religionen der Menschheit. Vol. 18. Stuttgart: W. Kohlhammer.
- Hofeneder, Andreas (2011). Die Religion der Kelten in den antiken literarischen Zeugnissen. Mitteilungen der Prähistorischen Kommission. Vol. III: Von Arrianos bis zum Ausklang der Antike. Vienna: Verlag der Österreichischen Akademie der Wissenschaften. ISBN 978-3-7001-6997-0.
- Maier, Bernhard (1997). Dictionary of Celtic Religion and Culture. Translated by Edwards, Cyril. Woodbridge: Boydell Press. ISBN 978-0-85115-660-6.
- Matasović, Ranko (2009). Etymological Dictionary of Proto-Celtic. Brill. ISBN 9789004173361.
- Powers Coe, Paula (2006). "Damona". In Koch, John T. (ed.). Celtic Culture: A Historical Encyclopedia. Santa Barbara: ABC-CLIO. pp. 557–558. ISBN 978-1-85109-440-0.
