= Bourbonne-les-Bains =

- Commune
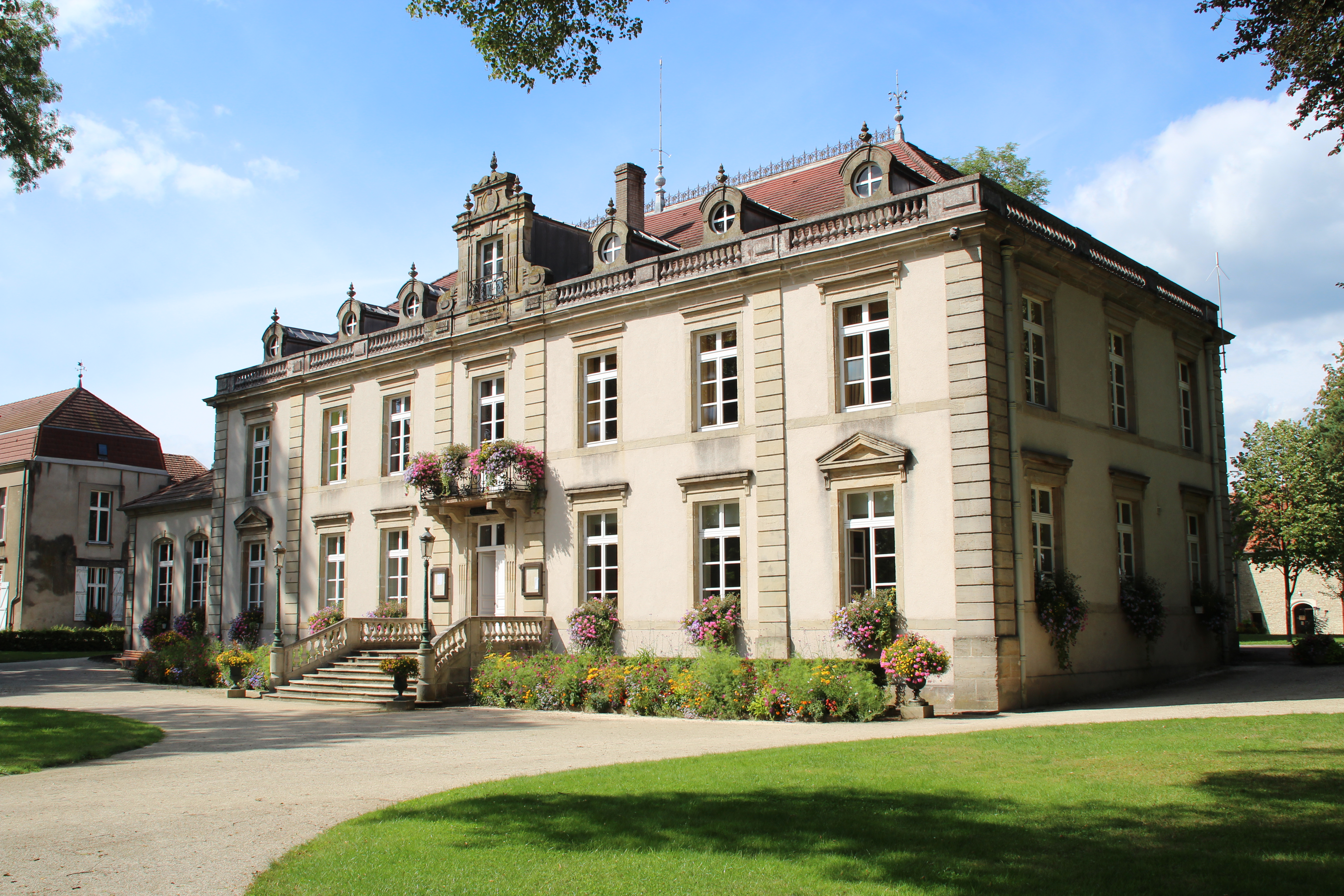
- The town hall in Bourbonne-les-Bains

- Coat of arms
- Location of Bourbonne-les-Bains
- Location within France Location within Grand Est
- Coordinates: 47°57′09″N 5°44′56″E
- Country: France
- Region: Grand Est
- Department: Haute-Marne
- Arrondissement: Langres
- Canton: Bourbonne-les-Bains
- Intercommunality: CC des Savoir-Faire

Government
  - Mayor (2020–2026): André Noirot
- Area^{1}: 64.93 km^{2} (25.07 sq mi)
- Elevation: 282 m (925 ft)
- Highest elevation: 444 m (1,457 ft)
- Lowest elevation: 245 m (804 ft)
- Population (2023): 1,958
  - Density: 30.16/km^{2} (78.10/sq mi)
- Time zone: UTC+01:00 (CET)
  - Summer (DST): UTC+02:00 (CEST)
- INSEE/Postal code: 52060 /52400
- Website: bourbonne.com
- ^{1} French Land Register data, which excludes lakes, ponds, glaciers > 1 km^{2} (0.386 sq mi or 247 acres) and river estuaries.

Bourbonne-les-Bains (French pronunciation: [buʁbɔn le bɛ̃]) is a commune in the Haute-Marne department in north-eastern France in the region Grand Est. It is situated on the river Apance, 32 km north-east of Langres.

== Population ==
Historical population
Year	Pop.	±% p.a.
1968	3,179	—
1975	3,095	−0.38%
1982	3,022	−0.34%
1990	2,764	−1.11%
1999	2,495	−1.13%
2007	2,279	−1.13%
2012	2,172	−0.96%
2017	2,073	−0.93%
2023	1,958	−0.95%
Source: INSEE

== Spa ==
Bourbonne is a health resort due to hot springs. These thermal springs were known to the Gauls and to the Romans who built baths. The Romans called the springs Aquae Borvonis. The name probably derives from the Gallo-Roman deity Borvo. More than 11,000 patients visit the spa each year.

== Sights ==
- Arboretum de Montmorency

== Notable people ==
- Louis Marie Joseph de Brigode (1776-1827), former mayor of Lille from 1802 to 1816 and Pair de France, died à Bourbonne

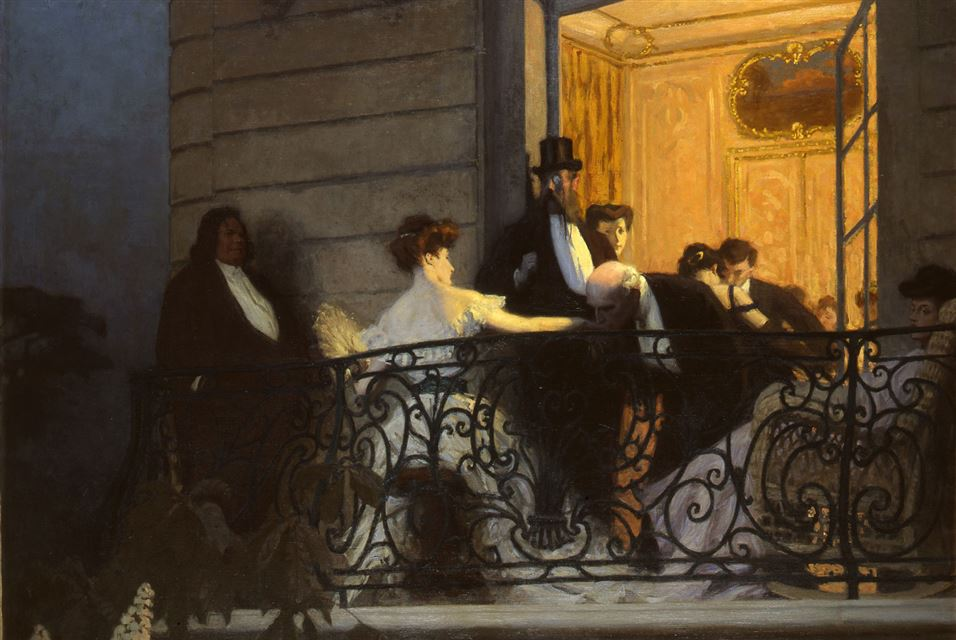
Le Balcon, a painting by René-Xavier Prinet

- Ernest Noirot (1851-1913), a French comic actor, born and died in the town
- Paul Maistre (1858-1922), highly decorated general, buried in the town before being transferred at Les Invalides in Paris
- René-Xavier Prinet (1861-1946), painter and illustrator, used to live in Bourbonne-les-Bains, died and is buried there with his spouse Jeanne (1865-1958), born Jaquemin, herself native from the town
- Gabriel Guérin (1869-1916), painter, born in Bourbonne
- Maurice Constantin-Weyer (1881-1964), writer, prix Goncourt 1928, was born and lived his first years in Bourbonne
- Henri Sautot (1885-1963), born in Bourbonne, governor of New Caledonia and mayor of Nouméa from 1947 to 1953
- Clément Serveau (1886-1972), painter, designer, engraver and illustrator, lived and is buried in this town
- Georges Fréset (1894-1975), naturalist painter whose works are exhibited at the town museum
- Robert Gouby (1919-1944), resistance fighter, Companion of the Liberation, spent part of his childhood in Bourbonne. His name was given to a road in the town, at the entrance to which there is also a commemorative stele.

== Sister cities ==
- Weiskirchen, Germany

== See also ==
- Communes of the Haute-Marne department
