= Bourbon-Lancy =

- Commune
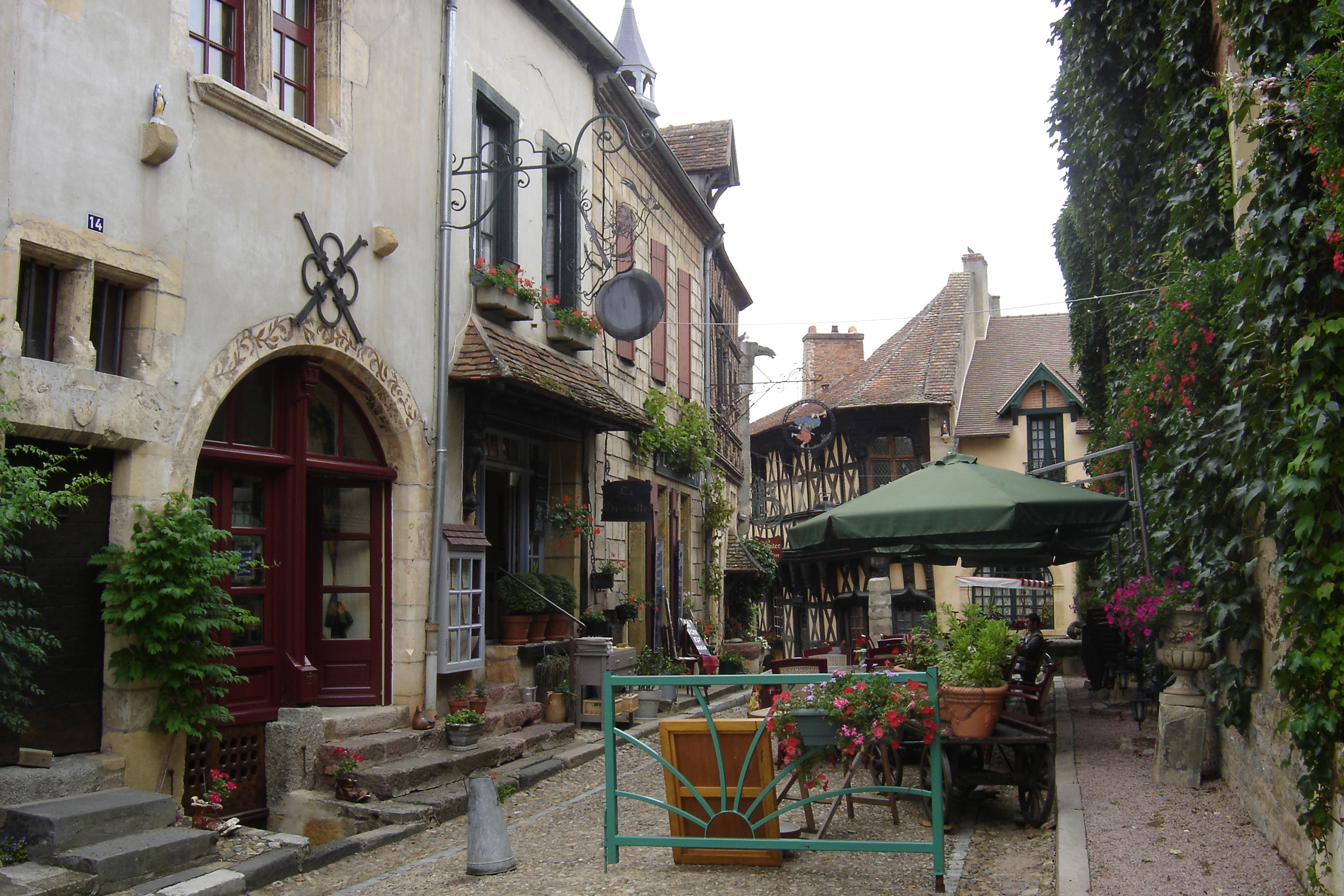
- Medieval center

- Coat of arms
- Location of Bourbon-Lancy
- Location within France Location within Bourgogne-Franche-Comté
- Coordinates: 46°37′13″N 3°46′27″E
- Country: France
- Region: Bourgogne-Franche-Comté
- Department: Saône-et-Loire
- Arrondissement: Charolles
- Canton: Digoin

Government
  - Mayor (2020–2026): Edith Gueugneau
- Area^{1}: 55.73 km^{2} (21.52 sq mi)
- Elevation: 240 m (790 ft)
- Highest elevation: 346 m (1,135 ft)
- Lowest elevation: 202 m (663 ft)
- Population (2023): 4,674
  - Density: 83.87/km^{2} (217.2/sq mi)
- Time zone: UTC+01:00 (CET)
  - Summer (DST): UTC+02:00 (CEST)
- INSEE/Postal code: 71047 /71140
- ^{1} French Land Register data, which excludes lakes, ponds, glaciers > 1 km^{2} (0.386 sq mi or 247 acres) and river estuaries.

Bourbon-Lancy is a commune in the Saône-et-Loire department in the region of Bourgogne-Franche-Comté in eastern France.

It is a rural town on the river Loire with a walled medieval area on the dominant hill. It has an authentic medieval belfry, wooden frame houses and fortifications which date from 1495.

== Geography ==
The commune is located primarily on the right bank of the Loire, the river running through the far west corner of its territory.

== History ==
Situated in Burgundy on the road from Paris to Lyon, and on the Loire River, the city's history spans well over 2000 years. Bourbon-Lancy is a spa town with thermal springs which have been known since Roman times, when it was known as Aquae Bormonis and enjoyed great prosperity. In the Middle Ages, Bourbon-Lancy was an important stronghold and a fief of the Bourbon family, and its suffix is derived from the name of a member of the family.

Cardinal Richelieu, Madame de Sévigné, James II of England, Catherine de Medici and other celebrated people visited the thermal springs in the 17th and 18th centuries.

During the 19th and early 20th centuries, it was a center for the manufacture of agricultural machinery.

=== Toponymy ===
The name Bourbon is derived from the name of the Gallic and Italic god Borvo and signifies bubbling or boiling, referring to the thermal hot springs in the town.

== Population ==
Historical population
Year	Pop.	±% p.a.
1968	6,263	—
1975	6,640	+0.84%
1982	6,507	−0.29%
1990	6,178	−0.65%
1999	5,634	−1.02%
2007	5,401	−0.53%
2012	5,187	−0.81%
2017	4,927	−1.02%
2023	4,674	−0.87%
Source: INSEE

== Industry ==
- Fiat Powertrain Technologies, a Fiat plant
- H. F. Guy, cabinet maker for the French loudspeaker manufacturer Focal S.A., on the site of the former factory used by lingerie-maker Dim (now DBApparel) between 1965 and 2001.

== Sights ==
Bourbon-Lancy has some of the most well-preserved medieval structures in Saône-et-Loire:

- Musée Saint Nazaire – housed in the 11th century Saint Nazaire Church - artifacts from ancient & modern Bourbon-Lancy
- Medieval center – shops, restaurants and an inn
- Thermal spas

The church of the Sacred Heart is an impressive example of nineteenth-century architecture.

The museums and casino also deserve a visit:

- Musée du Breuil
- Musée de la Machine Agricole Puzenat et des outils du bois
- Le Casino De Bourbon-Lancy

== Gallery ==
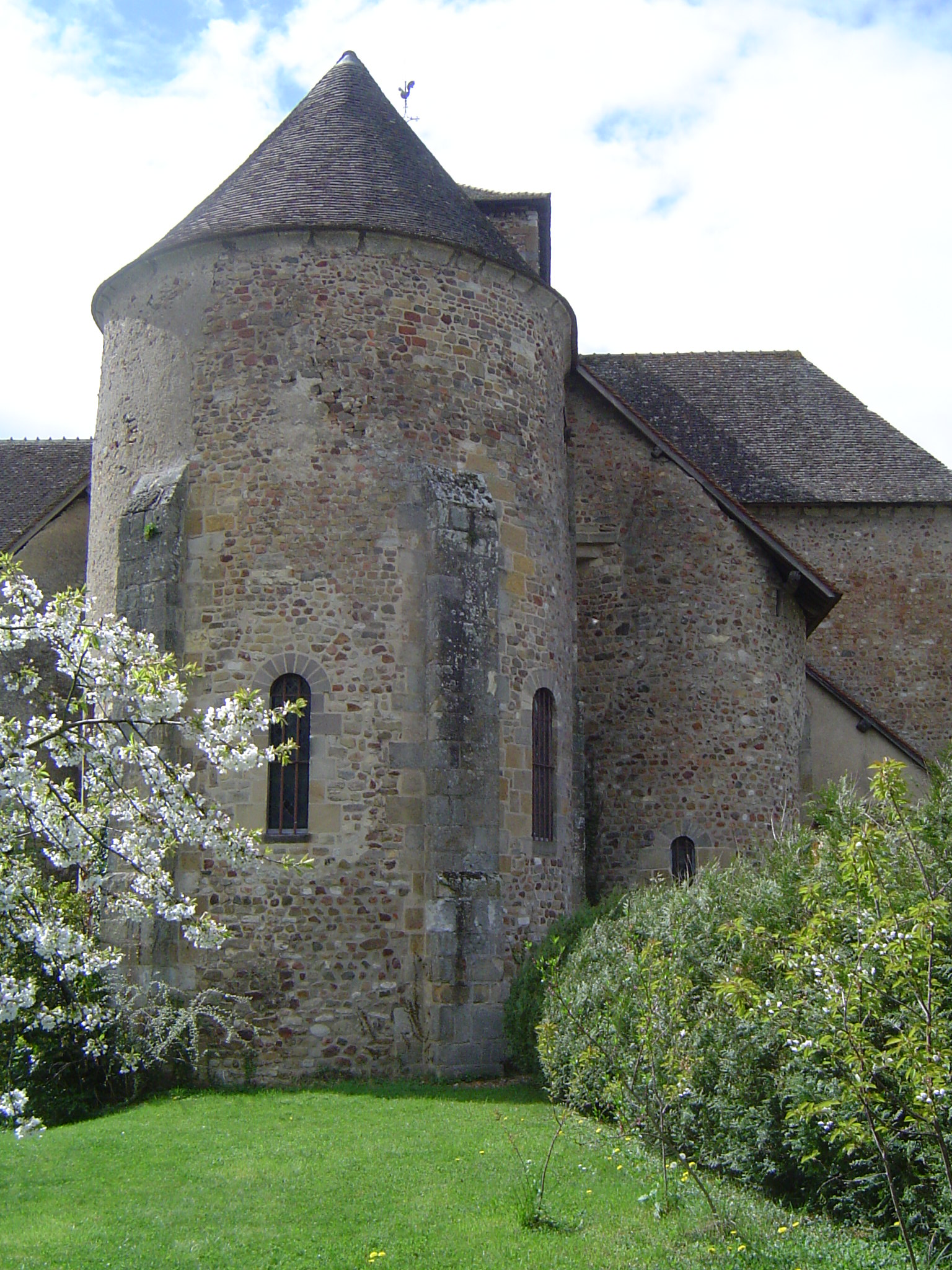
Church of Saint Nazaire

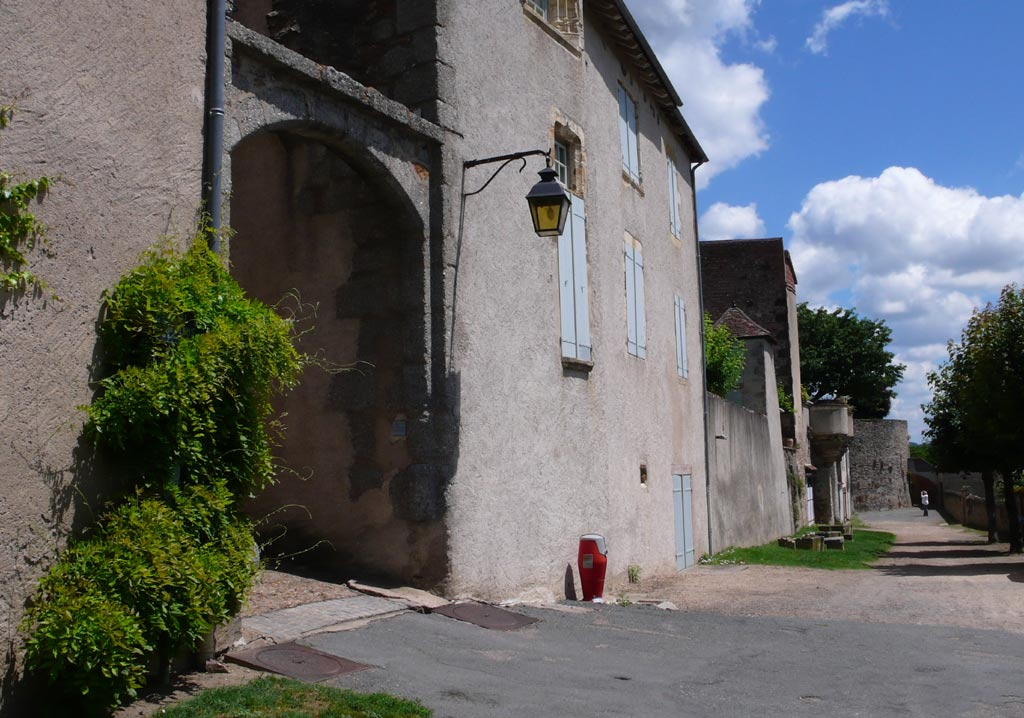
Medieval walls of Bourbon-Lancy

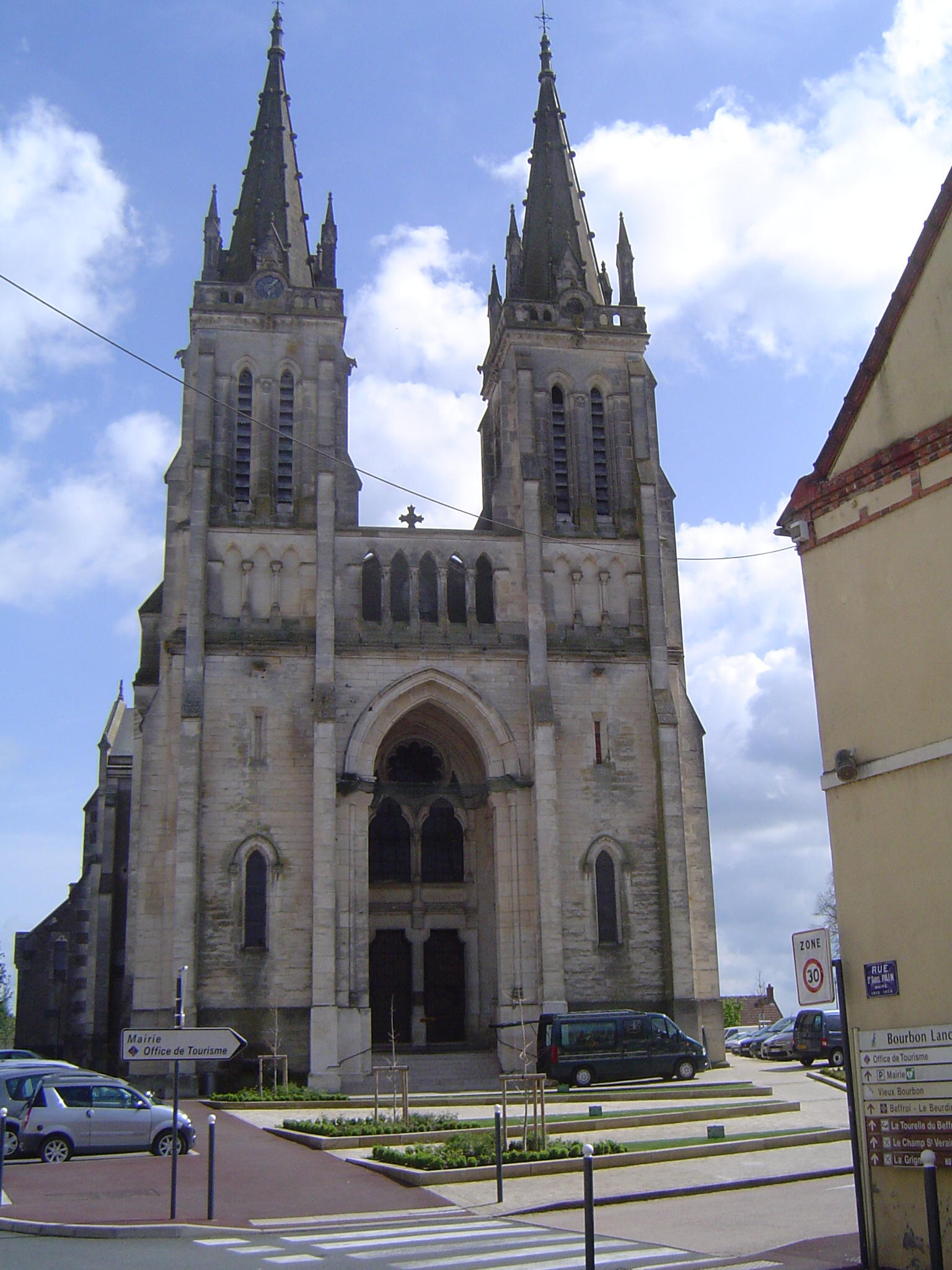
Eglise du Sacré Coeur

== See also ==
- Communes of the Saône-et-Loire department
