= Lenus =

Romano-Celtic healing and tribal god of the Treveri

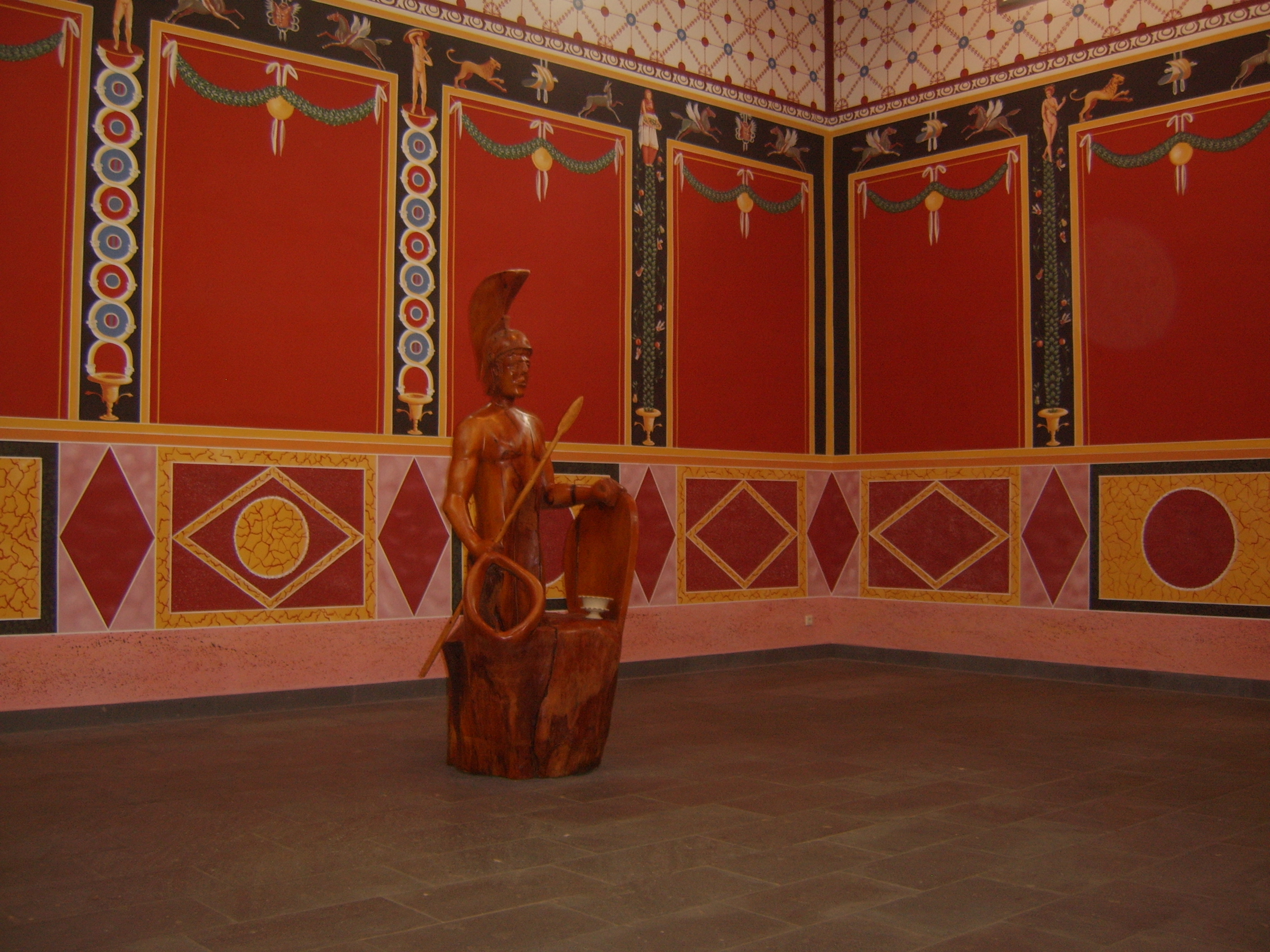
Central chamber of the reconstructed Gallo-Roman temple on the Martberg in the Eifel

Lenus was a Celtic healing god worshipped chiefly by the Treveri of the Moselle valley and almost always equated with the Roman Mars, as Lenus Mars or Mars Lenus. He was the leading god of the Treveran people, a protector of the tribe in war who under Roman rule came above all to be honoured as a healer. His principal sanctuaries lay at Augusta Treverorum (Trier) and on the Martberg above Pommern, both set around curative springs, and his cult is also attested in Roman Britain.

== Name ==
Lenus is a native Celtic name. Xavier Delamarre connects it with a stem leno- of uncertain meaning, perhaps 'wood' or 'grove', which would make Lenus a god of the woodland (cf. Welsh llwyn 'grove, bush'). No ancient author names the god, whose worship is known only from inscriptions.

Where the god is called Lenus Mars, the native name regularly stands first, before the Roman one. This order is unusual and is taken to show that Lenus was the established local god, onto whom Mars was later grafted.

== Cult and sanctuaries ==
=== Treveri ===
The centre of the cult lay on the left bank of the Moselle, opposite the Roman city, in a small, steep and wooded valley with a stream. Pottery from the site shows that it had been held sacred well before the Roman period, and a modest early shrine preceded the main temple. In the mid-2nd century AD a large temple was built, classical rather than Romano-Celtic in plan, with a columned porch and pediment and much use of marble, set within a precinct that held a great ceremonial altar and, to the north, a theatre used for the ceremonies of the cult. The chief priests, the flamines, were men of high rank. The spring above the precinct, long famed for its healing properties, was canalised to feed a small set of baths for pilgrims.

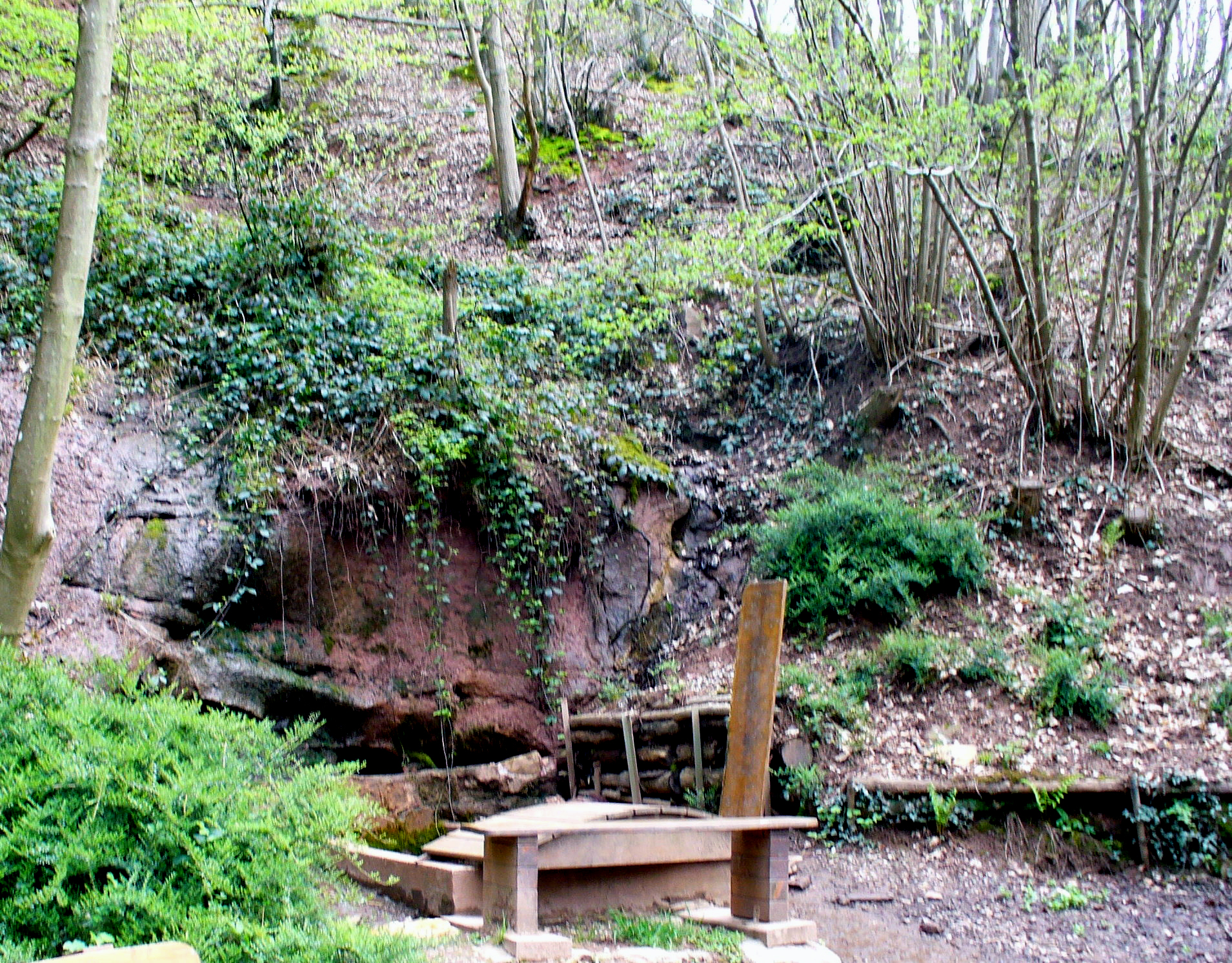
The spring near the ancient Lenus Mars temple in Trier

In one of the lesser chapels Lenus was worshipped alongside the Xulsigiae, obscure female deities who may be nymphs of the spring. A bust of a boy from the sanctuary reflects a further aspect of the god as protector of the young, in which he was invoked as Iovantucarus.

Lenus was worshipped in the Treveran countryside as well as in the capital. His largest rural sanctuary stood on the Martberg above Pommern, whose name records the god. Here the healing side of the cult seems to have prevailed. Some of the buildings served to lodge sick pilgrims, and one may have been a dormitory for the ritual sleep, or incubation, through which cures were sought. That the god was believed to answer such prayers is shown by a verse inscription, in Latin and Greek, set up by a man named Tychicus in thanks for his recovery from a grave illness.

At Trier, Lenus Mars was paired with a consort, the goddess Ancamna, who among the Treveri was elsewhere joined to Mars Smertrius at Möhn. Another god worshipped near the Lenus precinct, Intarabus, was likewise equated with Mars and may be a further form of the same native deity. Dedications set up beside the road to the sanctuary by two pagi honoured Lenus Mars, Ancamna and the genius of the pagus together.

=== Roman Britain ===
Lenus is attested in Britain, most clearly at Venta Silurum (Caerwent), the civitas capital of the Silures. There Marcus Nonius Romanus dedicated a statue to 'the god Mars Lenus, or Ocelus Vellaunus, and to the Divinity of the Emperor', in return for his college's release from public burdens, on 23 August AD 152, perhaps as a Treveran living abroad. At Caerwent the god is thus merged with two further Celtic deities, Ocelus, a god of the Silures who was also honoured at Carlisle, and Vellaunus, while a second Caerwent altar names the god simply as Mars Ocelus. Of the Caerwent statue only a pair of human feet and those of a goose survive, the goose being a bird linked with war in Celtic imagery.

An altar from the Chedworth villa in Gloucestershire, beneath a relief of a figure carrying a spear and an axe, has often been read as a dedication to Lenus Mars, and the villa has been interpreted as a healing shrine. The reading is disputed. Fritz Heichelheim took the figure for Sucellus, and Martin Henig doubted that the inscription could be read with any certainty.

== Interpretation ==
Edith Wightman regarded Lenus as one of the clearest examples of a Celtic god of the people equated with Mars, a defender of the tribe in war who was at the same time a giver of health and good fortune, the healing role coming to the fore under the pax Romana. He was in effect the chief god of the Treveri, and his sanctuary at Trier gave that tribal cult a single monumental focus. Its classical temple, its ritual theatre and its high-ranking priests mark an organised public cult, shaped by the rise of Trier as a centre of Romanisation and far removed from the simpler local piety found elsewhere in Treveran territory. Andreas Hofeneder lists Lenus among the tribal forms of Mars to which the juristic rule permitting a 'Mars in Gaul' to be instituted as an heir has been referred.

The recasting of a war-god as a healer is not peculiar to Lenus. A god who guarded the tribe and its land could readily be turned, in peacetime, against disease, and the same shift produced a series of curative forms of Mars in Gaul and Britain, among them Mars Vorocius at Vichy, Mars Mullo at Allonnes and Mars Nodens at Lydney. Even as a healer the god kept his warrior attributes, so that the spear-bearing figure carved at Chedworth, like the martial imagery of the healing forms of Mars elsewhere, sits oddly with the benign role it served.

Lenus and his consort Ancamna belong to a wider group of Gaulish healing couples, a male god joined to a native goddess, which is most common among the Treveri, the Aedui and the Lingones. Where most of these couples assimilate the male partner to Apollo, Lenus is assimilated to Mars, and the pair, like the type as a whole, is known almost entirely from inscriptions rather than from images.

The British evidence is best read in the light of the Treveran cult rather than as a cult of its own. Colette Bémont observed that Lenus is better attested, and earlier dated, in Germania than in Britain, and that the Caerwent dedication was made by a Roman citizen who may have been a Treveran living abroad. On her reading the likeness of divine names on the two sides of the Channel need not mean that the gods were the same, and the British occurrences of Lenus may reflect the movement of Continental worshippers rather than a cult rooted in the island. The readiness with which Lenus was there joined to local gods such as Ocelus and Vellaunus points the same way, and shows how loosely the martial character sat on these deities.

== Epigraphy ==
Text	Find-spot	Divine name	Translation	Reference	Comments
Leno Marti et Ancamnae Optatius Verus Devas ex voto posuit	Trier (Augusta Treverorum)	Lenus Mars, Ancamna	To Lenus Mars and Ancamna, Optatius Verus, a Devas, set this up in fulfilment of a vow.	AE 1915, 70	The dedicator styles himself Devas, a description of uncertain meaning.
Deo Marti Leno sive Ocelo Vellauno et Numini Aug(usti) M(arcus) Nonius Romanus ob immunitat(em) colleg(i) d(e) s(uo) d(edit)	Venta Silurum	Mars Lenus, Ocelus Vellaunus	To the god Mars Lenus, or Ocelus Vellaunus, and to the Divinity of the Emperor, Marcus Nonius Romanus gave this from his own resources in return for his college's freedom from liability.	RIB 309	Dated 23 August AD 152. Only the feet of the god and of a goose survive from the statue it once carried.
Servatus Tychicus divino Martis amore ...	Martberg, Pommern	Mars (Lenus)	Servatus Tychicus, moved by the divine love of Mars ...	CIL XIII, 7661	A bilingual metrical inscription, in Latin and Greek, giving thanks for a cure.
[...] M[arti?] [...]	Chedworth	Lenus Mars (?)	Fragmentary.	RIB 126	Beneath a relief of a spear-bearing figure. Both the reading and the identification with Lenus are disputed, the figure having also been taken for Sucellus.
