= Crassicia gens =

Ancient Roman family

The gens Crassicia, occasionally written Crassitia, was a minor plebeian family at ancient Rome. Few members of this gens are mentioned in history, and it is best known from a single individual, Lucius Crassitius, a freedman and a Latin grammarian.

== Origin ==
The nomen Crassicius belongs to a class of gentilicia originally formed from surnames ending in -icus, in this instance Crassicus, a lengthened form of Crassus. This cognomen was derived from a Latin adjective meaning "thick", "dull", or "rude", and by extension also indicating someone fat.

== Praenomina ==
The main praenomina of the Crassicii were Marcus, Lucius, Gaius, and Publius, all of which were among the most common praenomina throughout Roman history. A few of the Crassicii bore other names, including Titus and Tiberius.

== Members ==
This list includes abbreviated praenomina. For an explanation of this practice, see filiation.

- Gaius Crassicius P. f. C. n. Verris, named in two dedicatory inscriptions from the temple of Castor and Pollux at Cora in Latium, dating to the late second century BC.
- Gaius Crassicius P. f., one of the Roman emissaries who settled at Delos in the late second century BC.
- Tiberius Crassicius, mentioned in a list of donors to the temple of Serapis at Puteoli in Campania, dating from 105 BC.
- Lucius Crassitius, the grammarian, was a native of Tarentum, originally named Pasicles, but later called Pansa. He worked in the Roman theatre, and wrote a well-regarded commentary on Gaius Helvius Cinna's poem, Smyrna. In the latter half of the first century BC, he taught the sons of many leading families, and in his retirement he took up philosophy.
- Crassitius or Crassicius, a friend of the triumvir Mark Antony, was perhaps the former master of Crassitius the grammarian, who educated Antony's son, Iullus, unless they were the same person.
- Marcus Crassicius M. f. Castellus, a veteran of the Legio XXX Classica, buried at Beneventum in Samnium, in a tomb dedicated by his wife, the freedwoman Fufia Lychnis, and dating from the late first century BC.
- Crassicia Sp. f. Bassa, named in a sepulchral inscription from Rome, dating from the first half of the first century, along with Lucius Fannius Lupercus.
- Lucius Crassicius Ɔ. l. Hermia, a freedman and veterinarian at Altinum in Venetia and Histria, dedicated a first-century tomb for his wife, Abiria Maxima, and freedwoman, Eugenia.
- Crassicia P. l. Helpis, a freedwoman buried in a first-century tomb at Rome, along with her husband, Lucius Tampius Ingenuus.
- Titus Crassicius Paettusius, made a donation to the temple of Apollo at Salodurum in Germania Superior, and together with Crassicius Magius, made an offering to Sulevia, dating from the latter half of the first century.
- Crassicius Magius, together with Titus Crassicius Paettusius, made an offering to Sulevia at Salodurum, dating from the latter half of the first century.
- Lucius Crassicius L. l. Ennycus, a freedman who dedicated a tomb at Rome for his fellow freedmen, Gaius Asinius Zopyrus and Pontia Fausta, dating from the latter half of the first century, or the first half of the second.
- Crassicia Ursa, together with her husband, Aelius Aelianus, dedicated a tomb at Augusta Vindelicorum in Raetia for their son, Crassicius Constantinus, dating from the latter half of the second century, or the first half of the third.
- Crassicius Constantinus, a boy buried at Augusta Vindelicorum, aged seven, in a tomb dedicated by his parents, Aelius Aelianus and Crassicia Ursa, dating to the latter half of the second century, or the first half of the third.
- Marcus Crassicius M. f. Verecundus, buried at Pola in Venetia and Histria, in a tomb dating from the fourth century, or the latter half of the third, and dedicated by Oppia Laeta.

=== Undated Crassicii ===
- Lucius Crassicius, one of the municipal duumvirs at Beneventum.
- Crassicia Amanda, together with Tussidia, perhaps her sister-in-law, dedicated a tomb at Beneventum for her husband, Quintus Tussidius Primitivus, aged fifty-five, with whom she had lived for eight years and three months.
- Publius Crassicius Apollonis, dedicated a sepulchre at Rome for himself, his wife, Crassicia Cleopatra, and their family.
- Lucius Crassicius At[...], named in a pottery inscription from Concordia in Venetia and Histria.
- Marcus Crassicius Auctus, named in a sepulchral inscription from Rome, along with his sister, Donata Aucta.
- Titus Crassicius Avitus, buried at Salodurum, aged thirty-five.
- Crassicia Cleopatra, the wife of Publius Crassicius Apollonis, who dedicated a sepulchre at Rome for himself, his wife, and their family.
- Lucius Crassicius Corbulo, one of the Seviri Augustales, was buried at Salodurum, in a tomb dedicated by his sons, Publius, Primus, and Seccalus.
- Crassicius Fortunatus, made an offering to the gods at Thignica in Africa Proconsularis.
- Marcus Crassicius Hermogenes, dedicated a tomb at Rome for his patron, Marcus Crassicius Optatus.
- Marcus Crassicius Hyblessis, named in an inscription from Volaterrae in Etruria.
- Crassicia Ɔ. l. Italia, a freedwoman buried at Rome.
- Marcus Crassicius Optatus, buried at Rome, aged fifty-five, in a tomb dedicated by his client, Marcus Crassicius Hermogenes.
- Gaius Crassicius Repentinus, buried at Rome.
- Crassicius Sabinus Aptitianus, buried at Catina in Sicily, aged twenty-four.

== See also ==
- List of Roman gentes

== Bibliography ==
- Marcus Tullius Cicero, Philippicae.
- Gaius Suetonius Tranquillus, De Illustribus Grammaticis (On the Illustrious Grammarians).
- Poëtarum Latinorum Reliquiae (Surviving Works of Latin Poets), August Weichert, ed., B. G. Teubner, Leipzig (1830).
- Dictionary of Greek and Roman Biography and Mythology, William Smith, ed., Little, Brown and Company, Boston (1849).
- Theodor Mommsen et alii, Corpus Inscriptionum Latinarum (The Body of Latin Inscriptions, abbreviated CIL), Berlin-Brandenburgische Akademie der Wissenschaften (1853–present).
- Inscriptiones Italiae (Inscriptions from Italy), Rome (1931-present).
- John C. Traupman, The New College Latin & English Dictionary, Bantam Books, New York (1995).
