= Milecastle 59 =

Milecastle on Hadrian's Wall

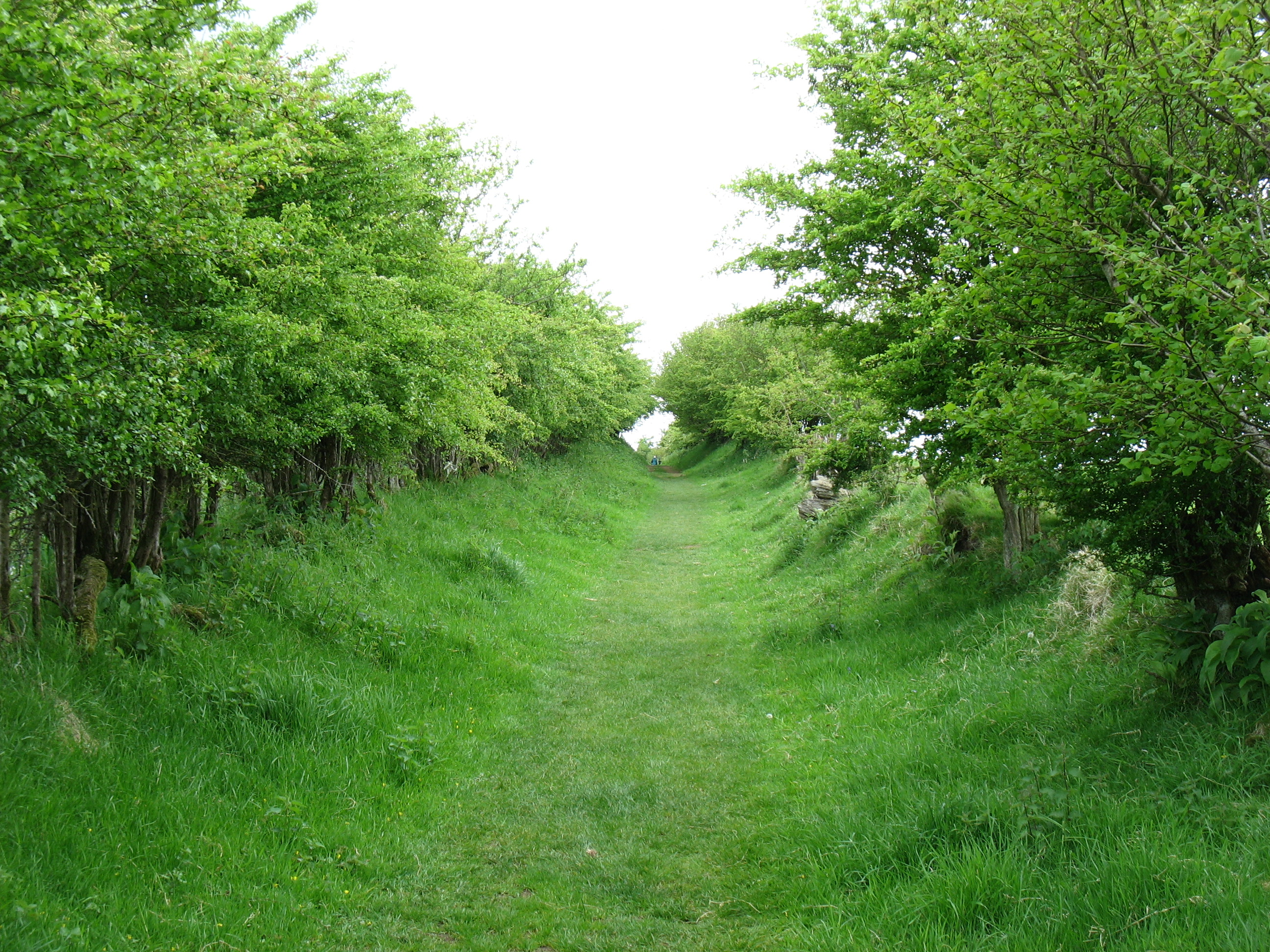
- Hadrian's Wall Path in the vicinity of Milecastle 59

- Location within Cumbria
- 54.94769°N 2.804851°W
- Type: Milecastle
- Location: Cumbria, England

Milecastle 59 (Old Wall) was a milecastle on Hadrian's Wall (grid reference NY48546174).

== Description ==
Milecastle 59 is on level ground 450 metres east of the hamlet of Oldwall in the civil parish of Irthington. It is directly north of Carlisle Airport. The remains of Milecastle 59 are now under pasture, and it is not visible above ground.

Milecastle 59 was excavated in 1894. The excavations yielded stone foundations, and a pottery assemblage, described as being "Romano-British". A geophysical survey conducted in 1981 indicated that the south wall of the milecastle still survives in situ, but that the side walls are ploughed away or robbed out.

An inscription (RIB 2014) was found some 150 metres south of Milecastle 59 near the Vallum. It reads "C(OHORS) IIII LIN(GONUM) F(ECIT)" which translates as "The Fourth Cohort of Lingonians built this." An altar (RIB 2015) found "near milecastle 59" was dedicated to Mars Cocidius, and erected by a centurion of the First Cohort of Batavians.

== Associated turrets ==
Each milecastle on Hadrian's Wall had two associated turret structures. These turrets were positioned approximately one-third and two-thirds of a Roman mile to the west of the Milecastle, and would probably have been manned by part of the milecastle's garrison. The turrets associated with Milecastle 59 are known as Turret 59A and Turret 59B. None of the turrets between Milecastles 59 and 72 were sought or identified prior to 1961.

=== Turret 59A ===
Turret 59A (grid reference NY48086170) has never been located. Its approximate position has been calculated in relation to other structures on Hadrian's Wall, and it is thought to be located immediately east of Oldwall. Turret 59A was searched for by the 1981 geophysical survey but not located.

=== Turret 59B ===
Turret 59B (grid reference NY476615) has never been located. Its approximate position can only be estimated in relation to other structures on Hadrian's Wall.
