= Ocellus (disambiguation) =

An ocellus is a simple eye found in invertebrates, in which pigment is distributed randomly and for which there are no additional structures. It is not to be confused with the ocelloid, a light-sensitive structure found in some dinoflagellates.

Ocellus may also refer to:

- Ocellus (mimicry), an eye-like marking
- Ocellus Lucanus (5th century BC), ancient Greek philosopher

== See also ==
- Ocelus
