= Icovellauna =

Gaulish water goddess

Icovellauna was a Celtic goddess worshiped in Gaul. Her places of worship included an octagonal temple at Le Sablon in Metz, originally built over a spring, from which five inscriptions dedicated to her have been recovered, and Trier, where Icovellauna was honored in an inscription in the Altbachtal temple complex. Both of these places lie in the valley of the river Moselle of eastern Gaul in what are now Lorraine in France and Rhineland-Palatinate in Germany. One such inscription was, somewhat unusually, inscribed on a copper tablet in Roman cursive letters.

At the temple in Metz, a spiral staircase led down to the water level, allowing worshipers to leave offerings in the spring and/or to take the waters. A statuette of a local Gaulish Mercury was among the ex-votos deposited at the shrine, which also included coins and ceramics dating from the 2nd to 4th centuries CE. Jeanne-Marie Demarolle states that Apollo was also associated with Icovellauna.

Demarolle glosses the name Icovellauna as bonne fontaine or "good fountain". Miranda Green follows Joseph Vendryes in interpreting the Gaulish root ico- as "water" and characterizes Icovellauna as a "water goddess" who "presided over the nymphaeum at Sablon in the Moselle Basin, a thermal spring-site". Xavier Delamarre, however, considers Vendryes' interpretation to be very improbable; on purely etymological grounds, he suggests that ico- might be the name of a bird, perhaps the woodpecker. The root uellauno- has been variously interpreted, though the interpretation "chief, commander" has recently found favor; see Vellaunus.

== Notes ==
A: Although Jufer and Luginbühl also report a number of inscriptions to Icovellauna at Malzéville, it has been suggested that this is an error on their part and that the inscriptions in question belong at Le Sablon in Metz. The Epigraphik-Datenbank Clauss/Slaby has no records of any inscriptions from Malzéville published in CIL or similar publications.
