= Suleviae =

Group of Celtic mother goddesses

Suleviae were a group of Celtic goddesses worshipped across Gaul, the German provinces, Britain and at Rome, generally understood as mother goddesses and as personal or household protectors. They are always named in the plural and are often assimilated to the Matres and to the Iunones, appearing in dedications as Matres Suleviae and Suleviae Iunones. No ancient author mentions them, and the goddesses are known only from inscriptions, of which around forty survive, together with the sculptures that sometimes accompany them. Their name is now generally read as 'those who guide well', though an earlier tradition linked it with the British goddess Sulis of Bath.

== Name ==
The name is recorded in Latin votive inscriptions as Suleviae and, in the dative plural, as Suleviabus or Sulevis, with the byform Suleis. The singular Sulevia also occurs, chiefly as a divine epithet. The goddesses are frequently given a further title. They appear as Matres Suleviae ('the Suleviae Mothers') and as Suleviae Iunones, and once as Suleviae Domesticae ('the household Suleviae'). No ancient author names them.

The name is generally explained as a Gaulish compound su-leuia, from the prefix su- ('good, well') attached to -leuia ('guide, leader'), so that the goddesses are 'those who guide well'. It is cognate with Welsh llywydd ('governor') and hylyw ('leading') and with Breton helevez ('good conduct'). The analysis, originally proposed by Léon Fleuriot, is followed by Xavier Delamarre and Patrizia de Bernardo Stempel, who note that a Latin dedication renders the same goddesses as Matres Gubernatrices ('the guiding Mothers').

An earlier theory connected the name instead with that of Sulis, the goddess of the thermal spring at Bath. This link was supported by Jan de Vries and Bernhard Maier.

== Cult ==
Dedications to the Suleviae are spread widely across the western Roman Empire. They occur in Gaul, in both Narbonensis and the northern provinces, in the German provinces, in Britain and at Rome, and eastward as far as Pannonia and the Danube lands. Maier counts around forty inscriptions and observes that a high proportion come from the city of Rome, which he explains by the presence there, in the 2nd and 3rd centuries AD, of Celtic and Germanic soldiers serving in the capital. The dedicants are chiefly private individuals, among them soldiers and veterans.

The plural form, and the frequent additions suis ('his or her own') and domesticis ('of the household'), mark the Suleviae as personal protective deities attached to an individual or a household. Paul-Marie Duval notes that they were called indifferently Iunones and Matres, the genius and the iuno being the Roman guardian spirits of a man and a woman respectively, so that the Suleviae belong with the tutelary powers of the individual. An inscription from Ladenburg shows them worshipped as a group of sisters.

In Britain the Suleviae are attested at three sites, Bath, Cirencester and Colchester, the last associated with an apsidal shrine. At Bath and Cirencester they are the local name of the mother goddesses, and the same sculptor, Sulinus son of Brucetus, dedicated to the Suleviae in both towns. At Cirencester two dedications are known, one found in the Ashcroft area together with images of single and triple mother goddesses, from what was probably a temple. Aldhouse-Green observes that the link between the sculptor's name, Sulinus, and that of his chosen goddesses is striking, and may reflect a personal devotion.

== Interpretation ==
The Suleviae are generally understood as mother goddesses. Proinsias Mac Cana placed them among the large class of Celtic mother goddesses and treats Sulevia as an epithet of the Gaulish 'Minerva', its plural Suleviae serving as a title of the Mothers on both the Continent and in Britain. On iconographic and epigraphic grounds they have been linked with healing, regeneration, fertility and maternity. At curative spring shrines the Mothers often bear a local name, and Suleviae is their name at Bath, as Glanicae is at Glanum.

Their relation to the Matres is not straightforward. In Gaul, Britain and Italy they are assimilated to the Mothers and appear as Matres Suleviae. A dedication from Rome names the Matres of the dedicant's father and mother and then 'my Suleviae' (Matribus paternis et maternis meisque Sulevis). Maier takes this to set the Suleviae apart from the Matres, while de Bernardo Stempel reads it as evidence that such Mothers were attached to a particular family or lineage. De Bernardo Stempel places the Matres Suleviae among the Celtic mother goddesses, within the wider tendency for Celtic divine names to vary in gender and number.

A connection with Minerva follows from the evidence at Bath, where the mother goddesses are associated with the goddess of the spring. Duval held that the Suleviae, the mother goddesses of Narbonensis found again at Bath in the company of Minerva, had probably merged in Gaul with a protectress of fertility. In Narbonensis the goddesses are sometimes named together with Minerva, as in a dedication from Collias. Some have suggested that the goddesses called Xulsigiae were a form of the Suleviae, on the ground of the similarity of the names.

== Epigraphy ==
The Suleviae are named in around forty inscriptions, in Gaul, the German provinces, Britain, Rome and the Danube lands.

Text	Find-spot	Divine name(s)	Translation	Reference	Comments
Suleviae [L]edennicae(?) Minervae votum	Collias (Narbonensis)	Suleviae Ledennicae(?), Minerva	To the Suleviae Ledennicae(?) and to Minerva, a vow.	CIL XII, 2974	The Suleviae, with an epithet read as Ledennicae, named together with Minerva.
ar]am(?) Suleviae [...]scae v(otum) s(olvit) l(ibens) m(erito)	Vienne-en-Val (Lugdunensis)	Sulevia [...]sca	The altar(?) to Sulevia [...]sca, (in fulfilment of) a vow, willingly and deservedly.	AE 1969, 402	Singular Sulevia with an epithet. A building inscription recording an altar.
D(e)ae Sulev[iae] Dimmia [...] talius(?)	Trier (Augusta Treverorum)	Sulevia	To the goddess Sulevia, Dimmia [...]	CIL XIII, 3664	Singular dea Sulevia. On a funerary monument, from the territory of the Treveri. Dated to the 2nd century AD.
Dea(e) Sul(eviae?) Attonius Lucanu[s]	Alzey (Altiaia)	Sulevia(?)	To the goddess Sulevia(?), Attonius Lucanus [...]	CIL XIII, 6266	The divine name abbreviated Sul(eviae). Dated to the late 2nd or early 3rd century AD.
Suleviabus C(aius) Paccius Pastor vet(eranus) leg(ionis) XXII P(rimigeniae) P(iae) F(idelis) D(omitianae) v(otum) s(olvit) l(ibens) m(erito)	Schweppenburg (Germania Superior)	Suleviae	To the Suleviae, Gaius Paccius Pastor, veteran of the Twenty-second Legion Primigenia Pia Fidelis Domitiana, fulfilled his vow willingly and deservedly.	CIL XIII, 7725	Dedicated by a veteran of the Legio XXII Primigenia. The title Domitiana dates it to the reign of Domitian, AD 89–96.
[S]extus S[u]leviabus v(otum) s(olvit) l(ibens) m(erito)	Lambesc (Narbonensis)	Suleviae	Sextus fulfilled his vow to the Suleviae willingly and deservedly.	ILN 3, 256	Dedicated by one Sextus.
Sulevi{a}bus C(aius) Iul(ius) Severus	Cologne (Colonia Claudia Ara Agrippinensium)	Suleviae	To the Suleviae, Gaius Iulius Severus.	CIL XIII, 12055	From Germania Inferior.
Sulevis Sulinus scultor Bruceti f(ilius) sacrum f(ecit) l(ibens) m(erito)	Bath (Aquae Sulis)	Suleviae	To the Suleviae, Sulinus, a sculptor, son of Brucetus, made this offering willingly and deservedly.	RIB 151	Statue-base. The sculptor Sulinus, son of Brucetus, also dedicated to the goddesses at Cirencester.
Sulevis [P]rimus [...]	Cirencester (Corinium Dobunnorum)	Suleviae	To the Suleviae, Primus [...]	RIB 106	Altar, the lower part lost. One of two dedications to the goddesses from Cirencester.
Matribus Sulevis Similis Atti f(ilius) ci(vis) Cant(iacus) v(otum) l(ibens) s(olvit)	Colchester (Camulodunum)	Matres Suleviae	To the Mother Goddesses Suleviae, Similis, son of Attus, a tribesman of the Cantiaci, fulfilled his vow willingly.	RIB 192	Base. The form Matres Suleviae. The dedicant Similis was a member of the Cantiaci of Kent.
