= Vellaunus =

Celtic and Gaulish god

Vellaunus is a Celtic god known from two inscriptions. He was equated to the Roman god Mercury.

== Epigraphy ==
The deity Vellaunus is known from two inscriptions.

The first, found at Caerwent, is the base of a state recording the dedication of the statue to:

[DEO] MARTI LENO
[S]IVE OCELO VELLAVN ET NVM AVG
M NONIVS ROMANVS OB
IMMVNITATEM COLLEGNI
D D S D
GLABRIONE ET H[OM]VLO COS D X K SEPT

"To the god Mars Lenus, otherwise known as Ocelus Vellaunus, and to the Imperial numen, M. Nonius Romanus, by privilege of the college, dedicated this gift using his own funds during the consulship of Glabrio and Homulo ten days before the kalends of September."

Above this base there survives only a pair of human feet and those of a goose. The dedication dates to AD 152. Mars Lenus was a god of the Treveri with great cult centres at Trier and Pommern; Ocelus was a local British deity, to whom another stone was inscribed at Caerwent, and who was also worshipped at Carlisle. Mars Lenus was clearly equated in Britain with other, localised Celtic divinities.

The second inscription dedicated to Vellaunus was located at Hières-sur-Amby in the territory of the Allobroges in southern Gaul. It reads:

AVG SACR DEO
MERCVRIO
VICTORI MAC
NIACO VEILAVNO
C CAPITOIVS MACRI
NVS RESTITVIT

"To Augustus and the god Mercury the Victor Macniacus Vellaunus, C. Capitojus Macrinus restored this sacred object."

Here Vellaunus occurs as one of several epithets of Mercury.

== Name ==
The root uellauno- is attested in compounds of Celtic onomastics. Some examples include toponym Vellaunodunum, and ethnonyms Segovellauni and Catuvellauni, a tribe of southeastern Britain, whose name may also be cognate with Catalauni (Châlons-sur-Marne) and Catalaunia (Catalonia).

Individual names include goddess Icovellauna; British leader Cassivellaunos, later famous in Welsh legend as Caswallawn; Vercassivellaunos, Dubnovellaunus and Cadwallon.

=== Etymology ===
The meaning of uellauno- has been variously interpreted. It has been glossed by Pierre-Henri Billy as "bon" (good); however, Pierre-Yves Lambert derives it from *uelna-mon-, meaning "chef, commandant, dirigeant" (chief, commander, leader). The latter derivation has been accepted as definitive by Xavier Delamarre and accords well with the Latin epithet victor found alongside vellaunus in the Hières inscription. Celticist Patrizia de Bernardo Stempel also translated Vellaunus as "Führer" ('leader').
