= Endlicher's Glossary =

Eighth-century list of Gaulish words

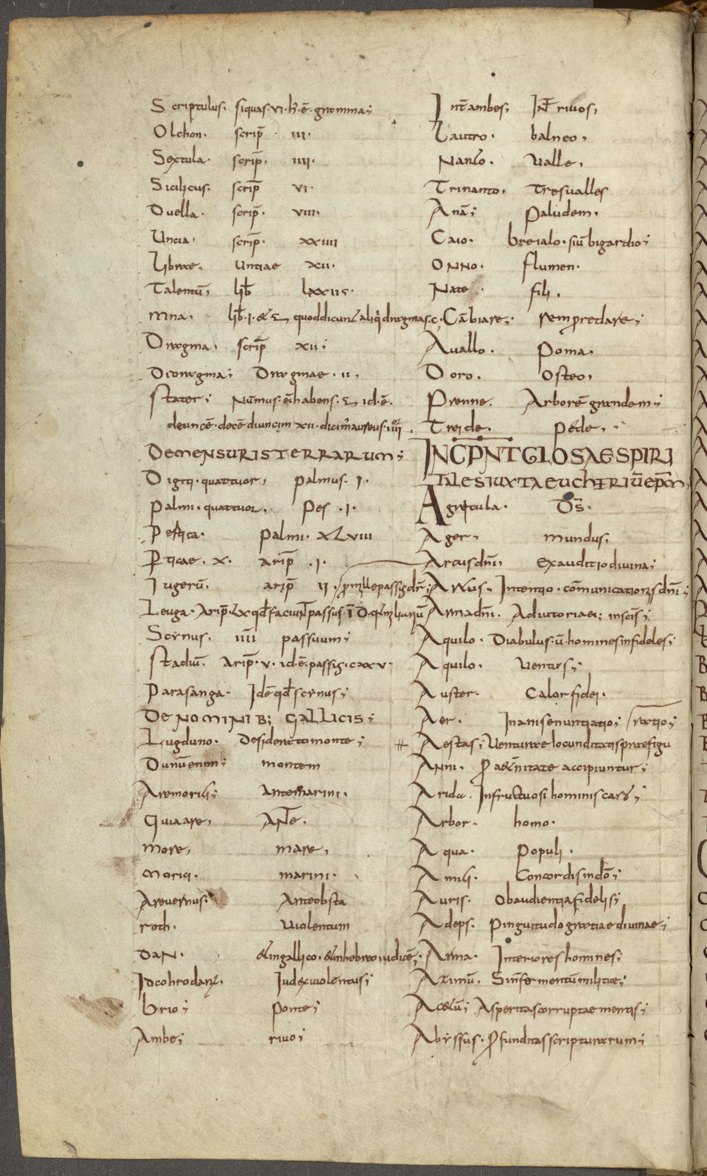
The Vienna manuscript containing Endlicher's Glossary

Endlicher's Glossary (Latin: De nominibus Gallicis) is a glossary composed of eighteen lines of Gaulish words, mainly to do with regional placenames, translated into Latin. There are seven surviving copies of it, with the oldest dating to the 8th century.

It is named after Stephan Endlicher who first described it in 1836. It is also known as the Vienna Glossary after the city where the first manuscript was discovered and is still held, in the Austrian National Library.

== See also ==
- Lugdunum

== Bibliography ==
- Pictet, Adolphe; Stokes, Whitley (1868). "Note sur le Glossaire gaulois de Endlicher". Revue Archéologique (in French). 17: 340–344. ISSN 0035-0737. JSTOR 41756079.
- Lambert, Pierre-Yves (2003). La langue gauloise. Collection des Hespérides (in French). Paris: Éd. Errance. p. 248. ISBN 978-2-87772-224-7. ISSN 0982-2720.
- Delamarre, Xavier (2003). Dictionnaire de la langue gauloise. Collection des Hespérides (in French). Paris: Éd. Errance. pp. 440. ISBN 978-2-87772-237-7. ISSN 0982-2720.
- J. N. Adams (13 December 2007). The Regional Diversification of Latin 200 BC - AD 600. Cambridge University Press. pp. 299–302. ISBN 978-1-139-46881-7.
- Toorians, Lauran (2008). "Endlicher's Glossary, an attempt to write its history".
- Stifter, David (Spring 2012). "Old Celtic Languages: Gaulish" (PDF): 158.
