= Xulsigiae =

In Gallo-Roman religion, the Xulsigiae were triple goddesses worshipped at the healing-spring shrine in Augusta Treverorum (present-day Trier). Edith Wightman suggests that they "may be local nymphs of the spring"; on the other hand, she also links their name to that of the Suleviae, whom she characterizes as "domestic goddesses". Their temple, a smaller shrine near the monumental Lenus Mars temple, has also yielded clay figures of the genii cucullati. The name itself is attested only from one inscription, where it accompanies that of Lenus Mars:

LENO MARTI
ET XVLSIGIIS
L VIRIVS DISE

TO V S L M

"To Lenus Mars and the Xulsigiae, Lucius Virius Diseto freely and deservedly fulfilled his vow."
