= Venta Silurum =

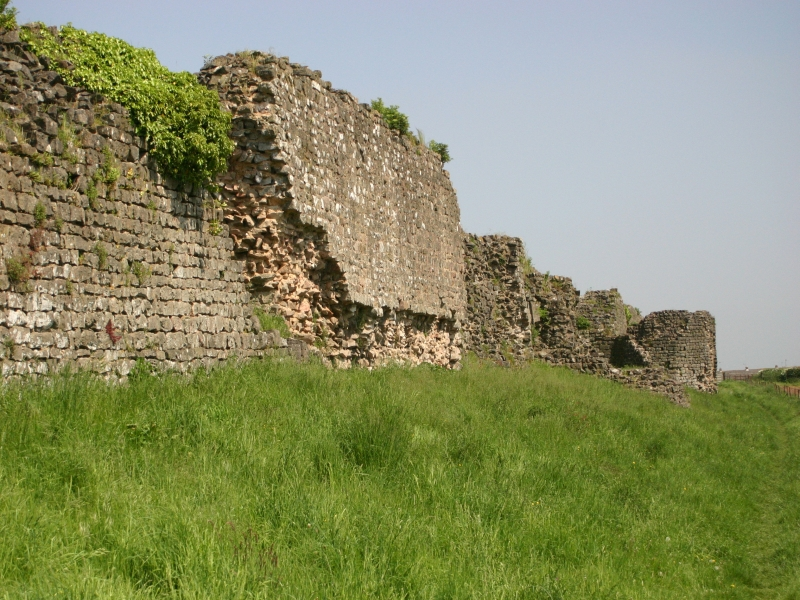
- The remains of the town wall

- Location in Monmouthshire
- 51.611°N 2.768°W
- Location: Monmouthshire, Wales, UK
- OS grid reference: ST469905

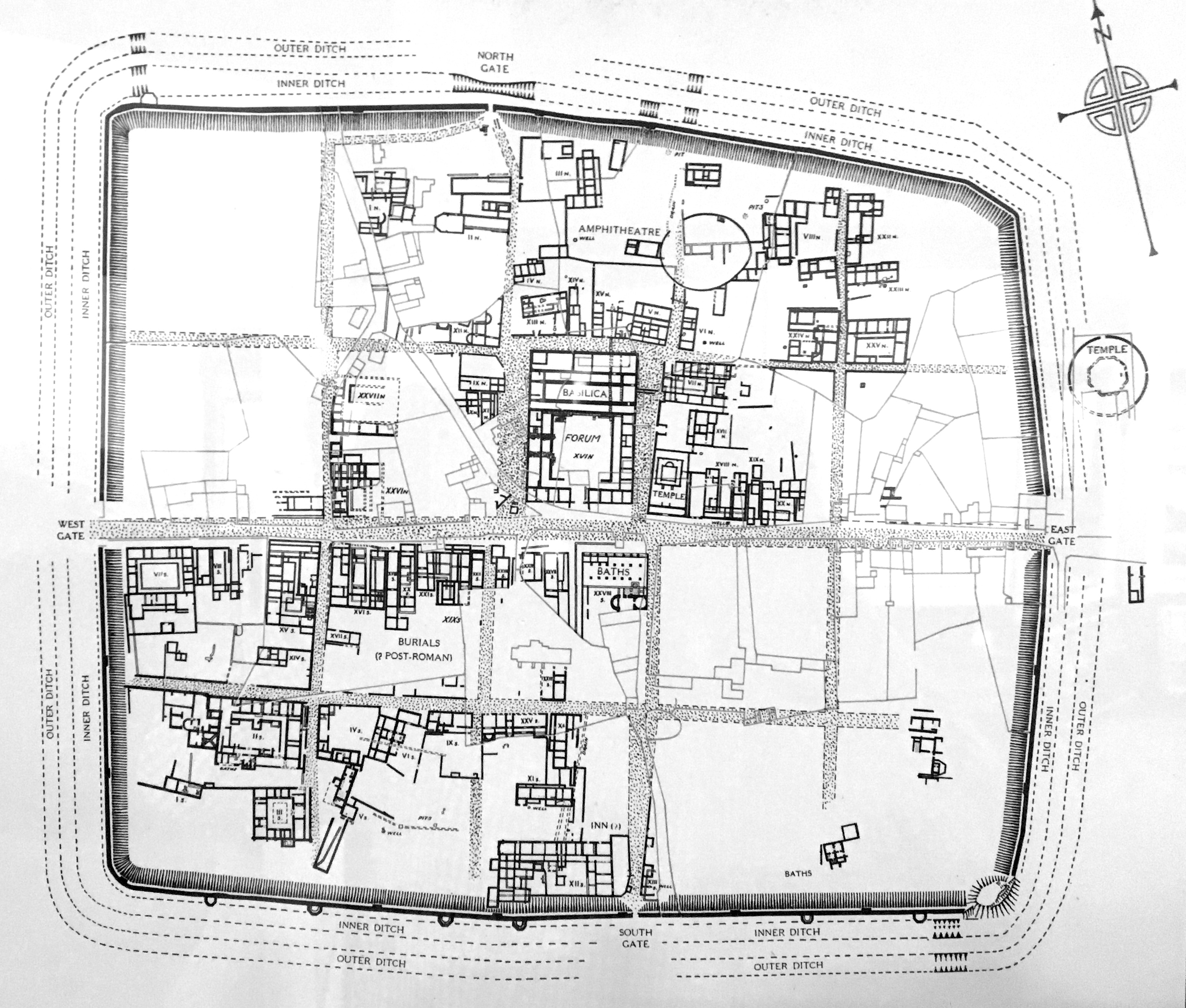
Venta Silurum plan

Venta Silurum was a town in Roman Britain (Britannia). The name Venta Silurum means "the town of the Silurēs", with the Silurēs being a powerful and warlike tribe. Today, it consists of remains in the village of Caerwent in Monmouthshire, southeast Wales. Much of it has been archaeologically excavated and the nearby Newport Museum has many of the finds on display.

== History ==
=== Foundation ===
Venta was established by the Romans in around AD 75 as an administrative centre for the defeated Silures tribe in Roman Wales. Venta Silurum seems to mean "Market town of the Silures" (cf. Venta Belgarum and Venta Icenorum). This is confirmed by inscriptions on the "Civitas Silurum" stone, now on display in the parish church. The town, which was located on the Roman road between Isca Augusta (Caerleon) and Glevum (Gloucester) and close to the Severn Estuary, was (in contrast with nearby "Isca") essentially established for civilian administration rather than for military purposes.

=== Development ===
Initially Venta had a forum and basilica. By the early 2nd century during the reign of Hadrian, the civitas had begun construction work on a market place and developing centre of local government. Public baths and shops, including a blacksmiths, were built about the same time. Remains of farms and dwellings, some with courtyards, have also been excavated.

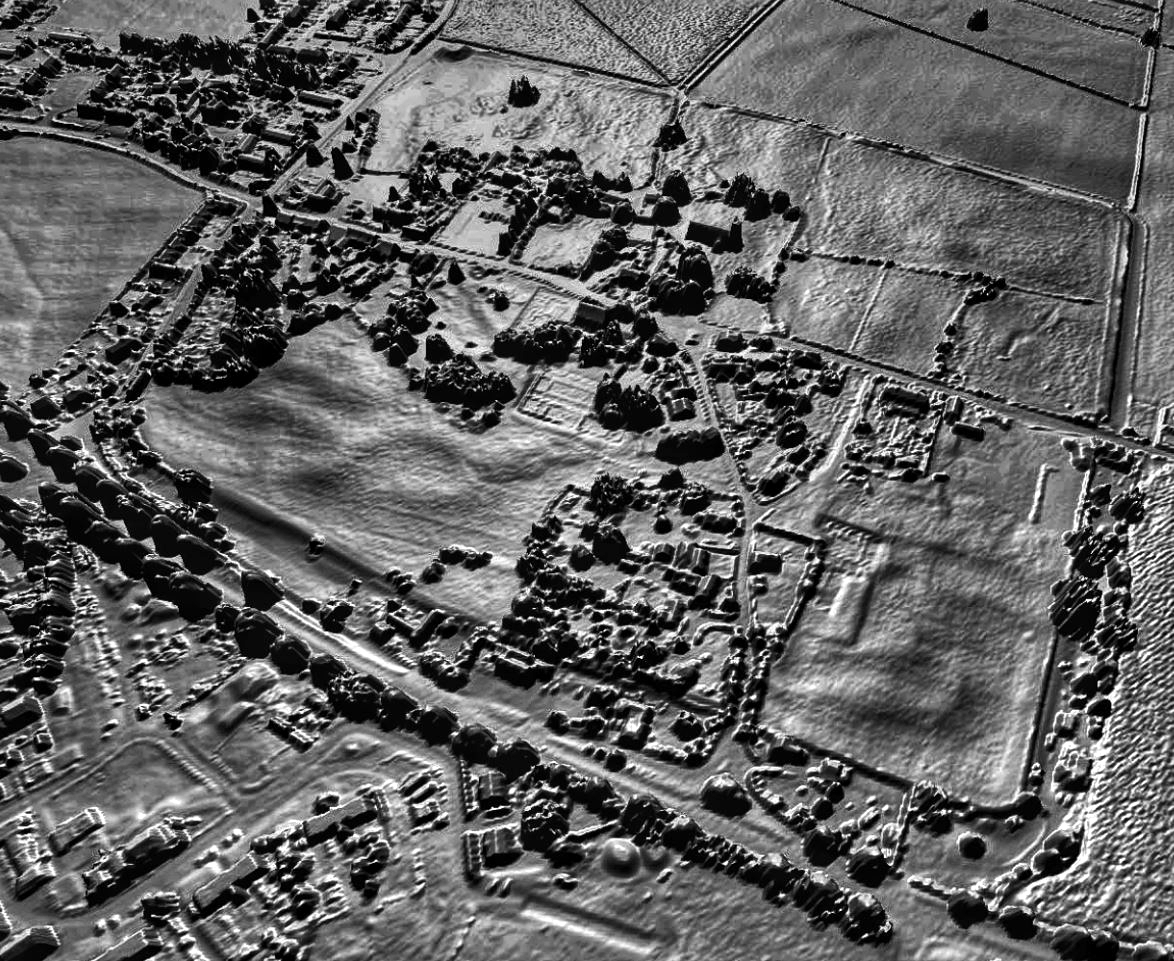
A lidar view of Venta Silurum from the northern side

A Roman temple, perhaps dedicated to Mars and the Celtic god Ocelus, has been identified on the site. A bowl with a chi-rho symbol shows that early Christian worship had begun in the late 3rd century.

The town lacked substantial defences until the mid 4th century when stone town walls were built. A small garrison may have been based in the town during this period. Large sections of the defensive walls are still in place, rising up to 5 metres (16 ft) in height in places. The walls have been described as "easily the most impressive town defence to survive from Roman Britain, and in its freedom from later rebuilding one of the most perfectly preserved in Northern Europe."

=== Post-Roman legacy ===
Following the withdrawal of the Roman legions from Britain, the town remained occupied until at least the mid-5th century. Early Christian worship was still established. The town might have had a bishop. According to traditional accounts in the Vitae Sanctorum Britanniae, a monastery was founded by Saint Tatheus in about the 6th century. The site of the present church occupies part of an early Christian cemetery.

The name Venta gave its name to the emerging Kingdom of Gwent (called initially "Kingdom of Guenta"), and the town itself became known as Caer-went or "the castra/fort of Venta/Gwent". Tradition holds that Caradog Freichfras of Gwent moved his court from Caerwent to Portskewett around the 6th century.

== Archaeology ==
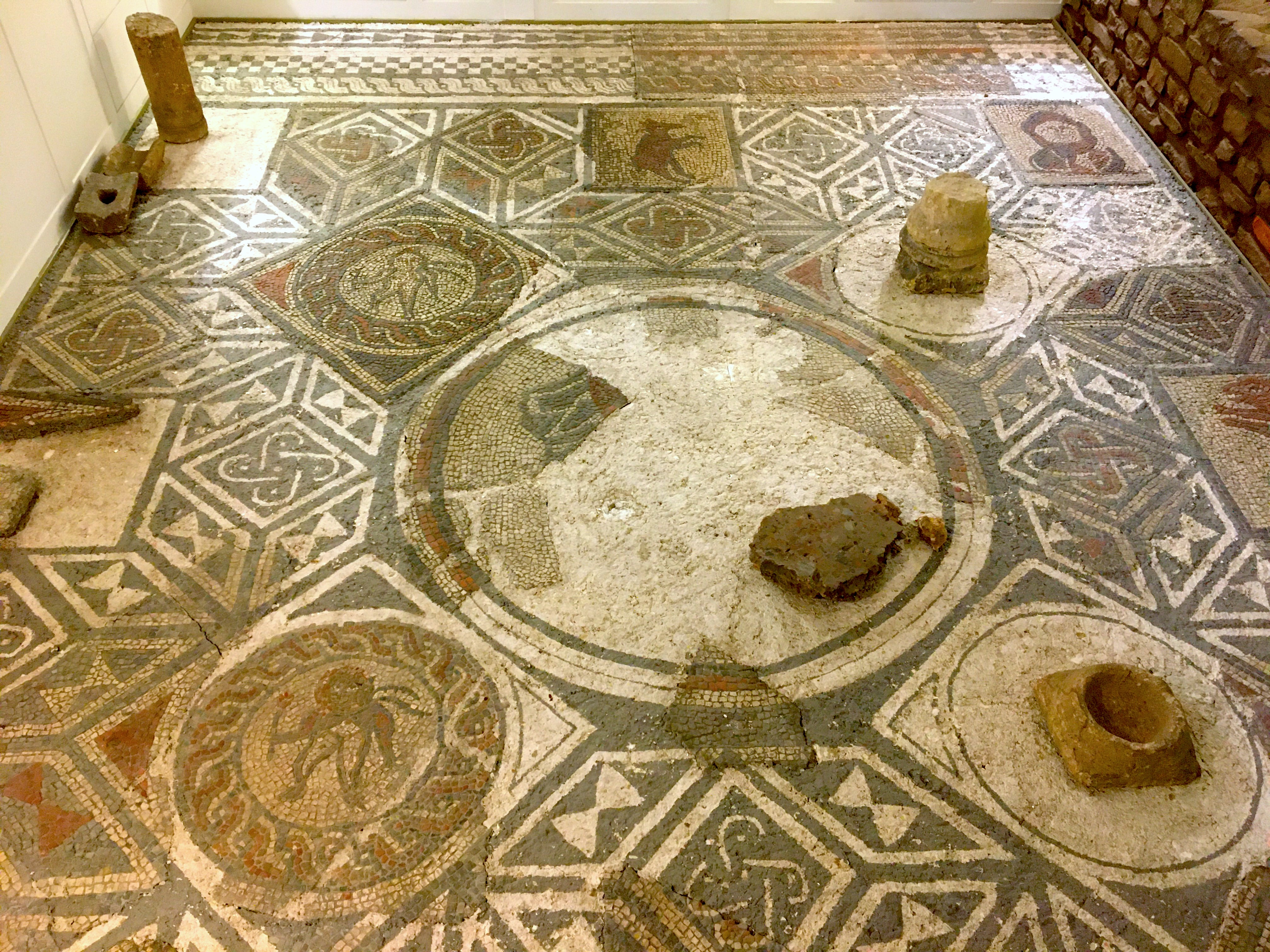
Four Seasons mosaic from a domus

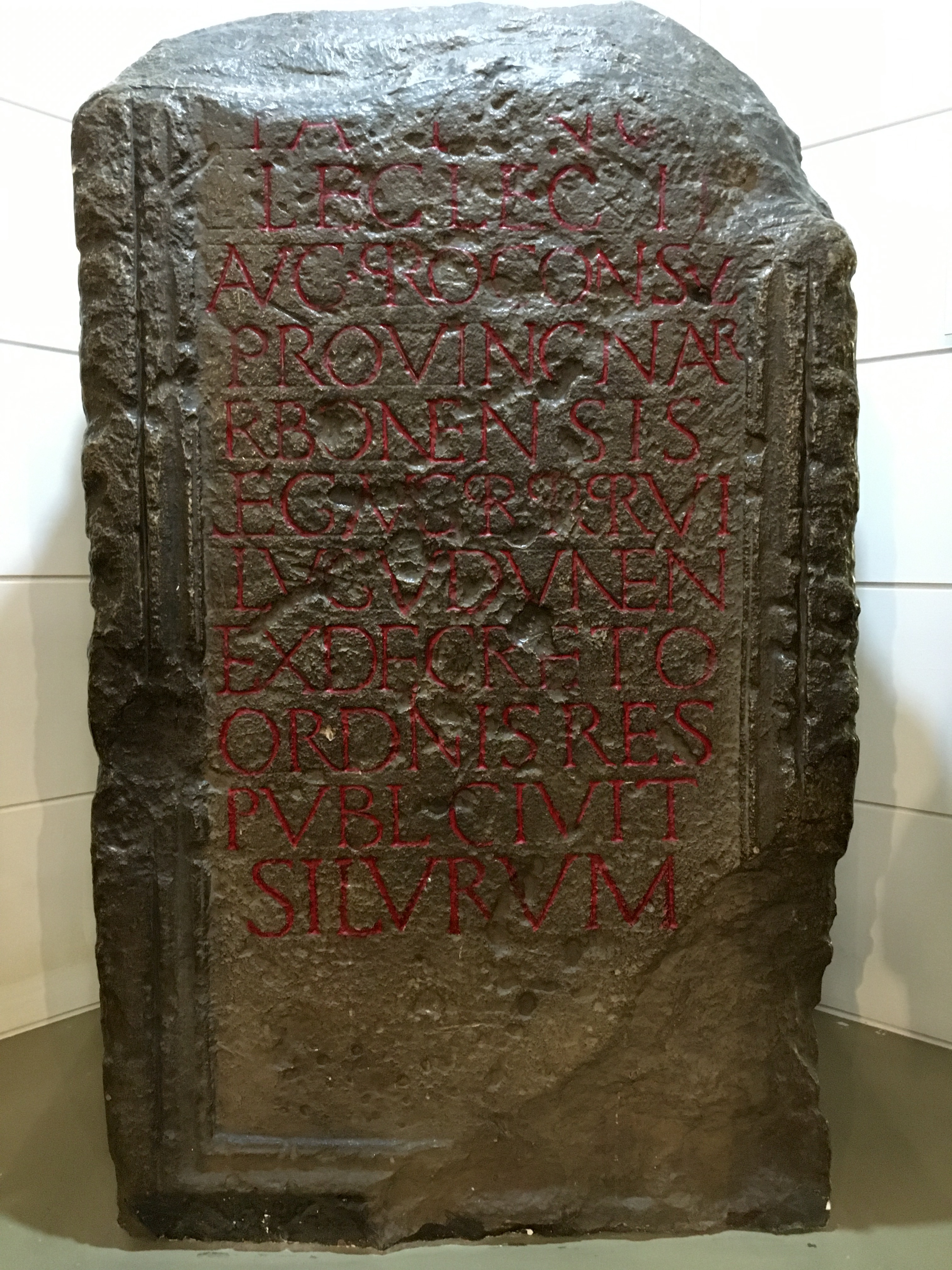
The Silurum Stone which refers to the "council of the Silures"

In 1881 a portion of a highly intricate coloured floor mosaic or Tessellated pavement, depicting different types of fish, was unearthed during excavations in the garden of a cottage. In 1901 House VIII South was excavated and two mosaic floors found. One was the Four Seasons mosaic now in the Newport museum.

In 2008, a dig involving Wessex Archaeology and volunteers from the local Chepstow Archaeology Society, found a row of narrow shop buildings and a villa with painted walls, frescoes of Roman art and mosaic floors. Among the artefacts excavated were a bone penknife hilt depicting two gladiators fighting, coins, Roman glassware, ceramics, human and animal bones, lead patches used for repairing water pipes and pieces of mosaic. These excavations featured in Channel 4's Time Team programme, broadcast on 25 January 2009. In 2010 a programme of archaeological work carried out by Monmouth Archaeology made a number of finds.

Modern houses are built on top of half the site of the old Roman market place. The ruins of several Roman buildings are still visible, including the foundations of a 4th-century temple. The rudimentary quality of most of the houses, few of which had mosaic or hypocaust-heated floors, indicates that, although a large settlement, Caerwent did not attain the importance or sophistication of other Romano-British tribal capitals.
