= Silures =

Celtic tribe of ancient Britain

The Silures (/saɪˈljʊəriːz/ sy-LURE-eez or /ˈsɪljəriːz/ SIL-yər-eez) were a powerful and warlike tribe or tribal confederation of ancient Britain, occupying what is now south-east Wales and perhaps some adjoining areas. They were bordered to the north by the Ordovices, to the east by the Dobunni, and to the west by the Demetae.

== Origins ==
According to Tacitus's biography of Agricola, the Silures usually had a dark complexion and curly hair. Due to their appearance, Tacitus believed they had crossed over from Spain at an earlier date.

The dark complexion of the Silures, their usually curly hair, and the fact that Spain is the opposite shore to them, are an evidence that Iberians of a former date crossed over and occupied these parts.

Jordanes, in his Origins and Deeds of the Goths, describes the Silures.

The Silures have swarthy features and are usually born with curly black hair, but the inhabitants of Caledonia have reddish hair and large loose-jointed bodies. They are like the Gauls or the Spaniards.

The Iron Age hillfort at Llanmelin near Caerwent has sometimes been suggested as a pre-Roman tribal centre. But some archaeologists believe that the people who became known as the Silures were a loose network of groups with some shared cultural values, rather than a centralised society. Although the most obvious physical remains of the Silures are hillforts such as those at Llanmelin and Sudbrook, there is also archaeological evidence of roundhouses at Gwehelog, Thornwell (Chepstow) and elsewhere, and evidence of lowland occupation notably at Goldcliff.

== Etymology ==
The Latin word Silures is of Celtic origin, perhaps derived from the Common Celtic root *sīlo-, "seed". Words derived from this root in Celtic languages (for example Old Irish síl, Welsh hil) are used to mean "blood-stock, descendants, lineage, offspring", as well as "seed" in the vegetable sense. Silures might therefore mean "kindred, stock", perhaps referring to a tribal belief in a descent from an originating ancestor. Patrizia de Bernardo Stempel hypothesises that the Silures were originally referred to as silo-riks, "rich in grain".

== Roman resistance ==
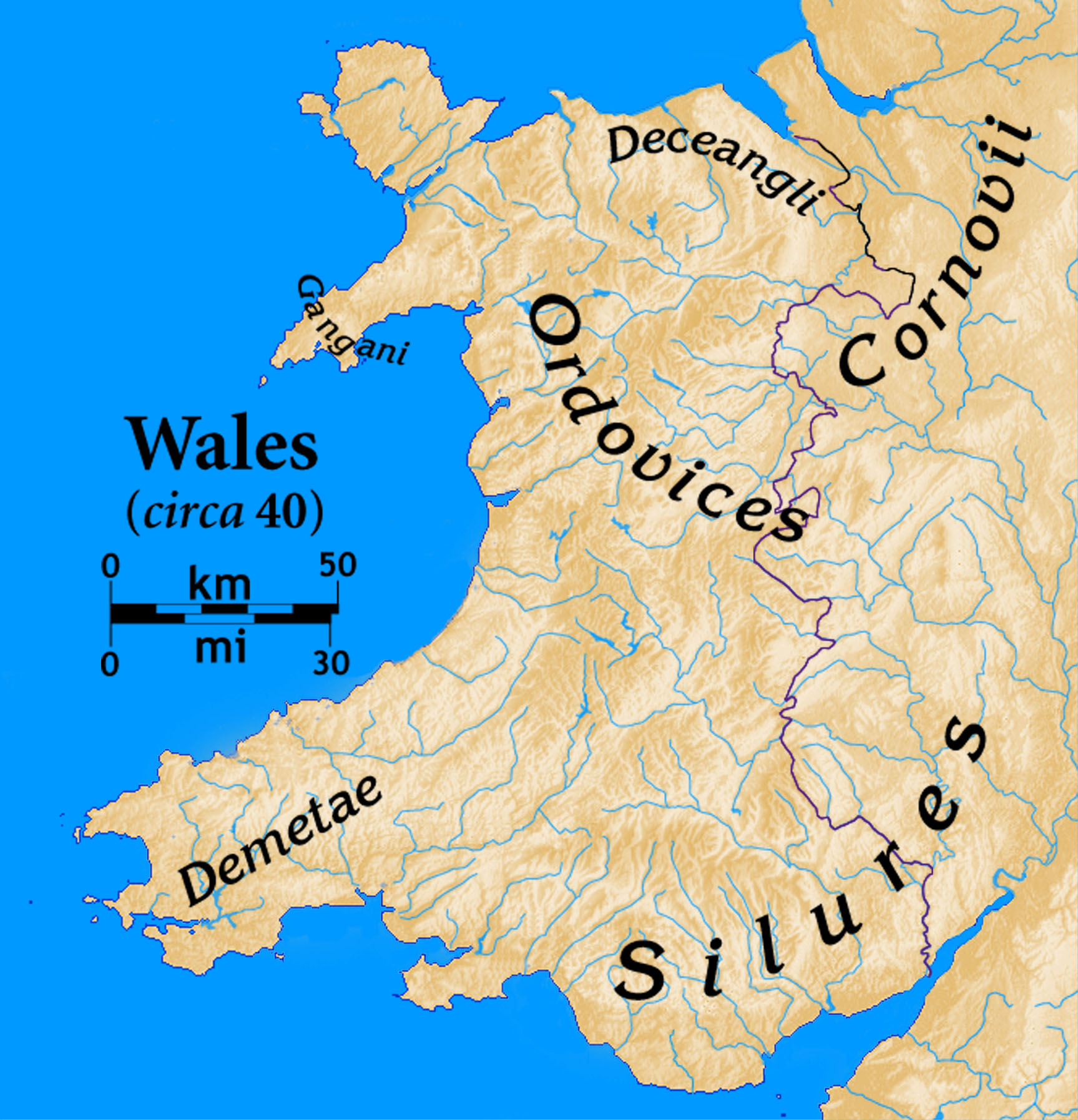
Tribes of Wales at the time of the Roman invasion. The modern Welsh border is also shown, for reference purposes.

The Silures fiercely resisted Roman conquest about AD 48, with the assistance of Caratacus, a military leader and prince of the Catuvellauni, who had fled from further east after his own tribe was defeated.

The first attack on the Welsh tribes was by the legate Publius Ostorius Scapula about AD 48. Ostorius first attacked the Deceangli in the north-east of what is now Wales; however, little else is known or recorded of this conflict. He spent several years campaigning against the Silures and the Ordovices. Their resistance was led by Caratacus, who had fled from the south-east (of what is now England) when it was conquered by the Romans. He first led the Silures, then moved to the territory of the Ordovices, where he was defeated by Ostorius in AD 51.

The Silures were not subdued, however, and waged effective guerrilla warfare against the Roman forces. Ostorius had announced that they posed such a danger that they should be either exterminated or transplanted. His threats only increased the Silures' determination to resist. They surrounded and attacked a large legionary force occupied in building Roman forts in their territory; it was rescued by others only with difficulty and considerable loss. The Silures also took Roman prisoners as hostages and distributed them amongst their neighbouring tribes in order to bind them together and encourage resistance.

Ostorius died with the Silures still unconquered. After his death, they defeated the Second Legion. It remains unclear whether the Silures were militarily defeated or simply agreed to come to terms, but Roman sources suggest rather opaquely that they were eventually subdued by Sextus Julius Frontinus in a series of campaigns ending about AD 78. The Roman Tacitus wrote of the Silures: non atrocitate, non clementia mutabatur – the tribe "was changed neither by cruelty nor by clemency".

== Romanization ==
To aid the Roman administration in keeping down local opposition, a legionary fortress (Isca, later Caerleon) was planted in the midst of tribal territory.

The town of Venta Silurum (Caerwent, six miles west of Chepstow) was established in AD 75. It became a Romanized town, not unlike Calleva Atrebatum (Silchester), but smaller. An inscription shows that, under the Roman Empire, it was the capital of the Silures, whose ordo (local council) provided local government for the district. Its massive Roman walls still survive, and excavations have revealed a forum, a temple, baths, amphitheatre, shops, and many comfortable houses with mosaic floors, etc. In the late 1st and early 2nd centuries, the Silures were given some nominal independence and responsibility for local administration. As was standard practice, as revealed by inscriptions, the Romans matched their deities with local Silurian ones, and the local deity Ocelus was identified with Mars, the Roman god of war.

Caerwent seems to have continued in use in the post-Roman period as a religious centre. The territory of the Silures later developed as the 5th-century Welsh kingdoms of Gwent, Brycheiniog, and Gwynllŵg. Some theories concerning King Arthur make him a leader in this area. There is evidence of cultural continuity throughout the Roman period, from the Silures to the kingdom of Gwent in particular, as shown by leaders of Gwent using the name "Caradoc" in remembrance of the British hero Caratacus.

== The term "Silurian" ==
Reference is occasionally made to this period of Celtic history by the use of terms such as "Silurian". The poet Henry Vaughan called himself a "Silurist", by virtue of his roots in South Wales.

The geological period Silurian was first described by Roderick Murchison in rocks located in the original lands of the Silures, hence the name. That period postdates the Cambrian and Ordovician periods, whose names are also derived from ancient Wales.
