= Gaulish =

Ancient Celtic language of continental Europe

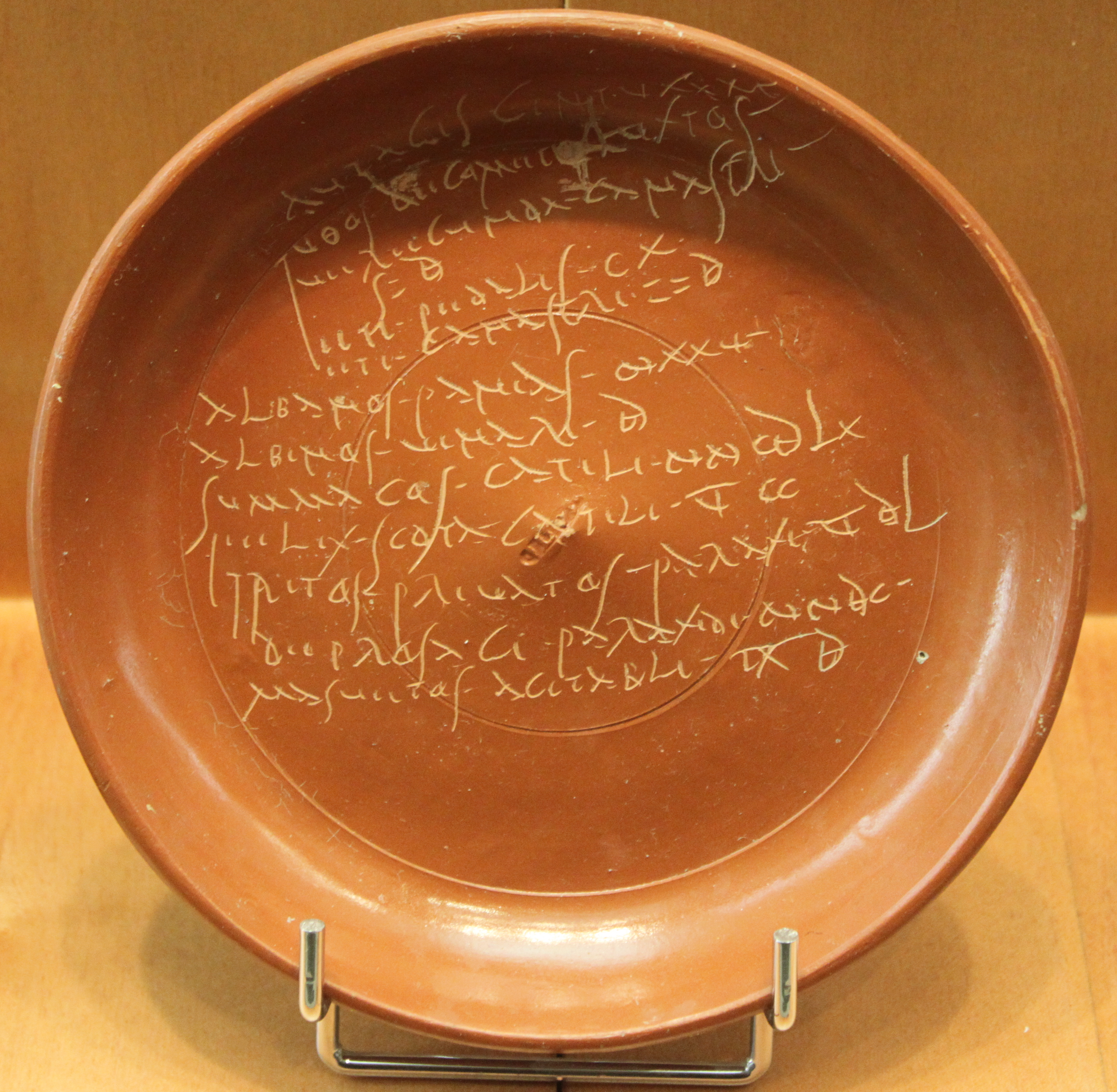
- Gaulish cursive script on terra sigillata from La Graufesenque.
- Region: Gaul
- Ethnicity: Gauls
- Extinct: Mid-1st millennium AD
- Language family: Indo-European: Celtic; Continental Celtic; Gaulish
- Writing system: Old Italic, Greek, Latin

Language codes
- ISO 639-3: Variously: xtg – Transalpine Gaulish (proper) xga – Galatian xcg – ?Cisalpine Gaulish xlp – ?Lepontic
- Glottolog: tran1282 Transalpine Gaulish

Gaulish is the ancient Celtic language that was spoken by the tribes of Gaul (modern-day France, and neighboring areas up to the Rhine) before and during the period of the Roman Empire. In a wider sense, it also comprised neighboring Celtic dialects that were spoken in Britain, across much of central Europe, and in parts of Southeastern Europe and Anatolia ("Galatian"). Of the Old Celtic languages, Gaulish was the most widespread and best attested. Gaulish in Western Europe was supplanted by Vulgar Latin (Note: for the early development of Vulgar Latin (the conventional term for what could more adequately be named "spoken Latin") see Mohl, Introduction à la chronologie du latin vulgaire (1899) and Wagner, Introduction à la linguistique française, avec supplément bibliographique (1965), p. 41 for a bibliography.) by around the end of the 5th century.

Gaulish is found in hundreds of short, often fragmentary inscriptions, ranging from religious monuments, to smaller objects such as coins, stamps, and spindle whorls. A smaller number of longer texts have also been recovered, such as curse tablets, accounting records, and the Coligny calendar, among others.

Gaulish was written in several different scripts, beginning with Old Italic and Greek, before shifting to Roman capitals and cursive following the Gallic Wars.

The legacy of Gaulish endures in numerous placenames spanning its former range (such as Paris or the River Seine). It also forms the basis of some words still in use today, including modern terms like ambassador and car.

== Classification and distribution ==
Expansion of Celtic peoples. Area of the Hallstatt culture in the 6th century BC. Great Celtic expansion, c.275 BC. Unclear Celtic affiliation (Lusitanians and Ligurians) The area of the Celtic languages today

Gaulish belongs to the Celtic language family, which is estimated to have begun differentiating from Proto-Celtic and expanding territorially during the late Bronze Age. Gaulish is a continental Celtic language (compared to Insular Celtic), as well as a p-Celtic language like Breton and Welsh, meaning it underwent a change of the Indo-European labialized voiceless velar stop from /kʷ/ > /p/ (unlike q-Celtic languages, such as Gaelic or Celtiberian).

The significance and implications these categories have for how Gaulish relates to other Celtic languages are still debated, with scholars emphasizing each grouping differently. Some scholars have further proposed composite models, such as Sims-Williams (2007), who sees Continental and Insular varieties as part of a dialect continuum, with genealogical splits and areal innovations intersecting.

Due to the expansion of Celtic tribes in the 4th to 3rd centuries BC, Gaulish, as well as other closely related dialects, came to be spoken across a vast area extending from Britain and France in the west to the Alpine region and Pannonia in central Europe. Additional speaking communities became established further east, in parts of the Balkans and Anatolia. The precise taxonomy of this linguistic area remains uncertain due to fragmentary evidence.

In spite of the limited surviving evidence, some regional variations of Gaulish are clear:

- Cisalpine Gaulish: Inscriptions made from the 2nd to 1st centuries BC in Cisalpine Gaul (northern Italy), which share the Old Italic script used in Lepontic inscriptions, but which are found outside the Lepontic area proper. They share some linguistic features both with Lepontic and with Transalpine Gaulish, which may be phonological or a matter of differing spelling conventions.
- Gallo-Greek: Inscriptions starting from the 3rd century BC, written in the Greek alphabet, and found mainly in the Rhône area of present-day Occitania and Provence, where Greek cultural influence was present via the colony of Massilia, founded circa 600 BC. After the Roman conquest (58–50 BC), Gaulish writing in the area shifted to Latin script.

Other known subgroups of this linguistic area besides Gaulish include:

- Lepontic: Attested from a small area on the south slopes of the Alps. It is the oldest Celtic language known to have been written, with inscriptions in a variant of Old Italic script appearing circa 600 BC. It has been described as either an "early dialect of an outlying form of Gaulish" or a separate Continental Celtic language. Scholars have debated to what extent the distinctive features of Lepontic reflect merely its earlier origin or a genuine genealogical split, and to what extent Cisalpine Gaulish should be seen as a continuation of Lepontic or an independent offshoot of mainstream Transalpine Gaulish.
- Galatian: Spoken in central Anatolia, is poorly attested but believed to be closely related to the Gaulish language.

Apart from the Greek language, which is spoken throughout the entire East, the Galatians have their own language, almost the same as the Treveri. — Saint Jerome, 387 AD (Commentarii in Epistulam ad Galatas II, 3).

- Norican, which survives from only two inscriptions in Slovakia and Austria, appears quite similar to those of Gaul and can be potentially considered a dialect of the same language.

== History ==
=== Prehistory ===
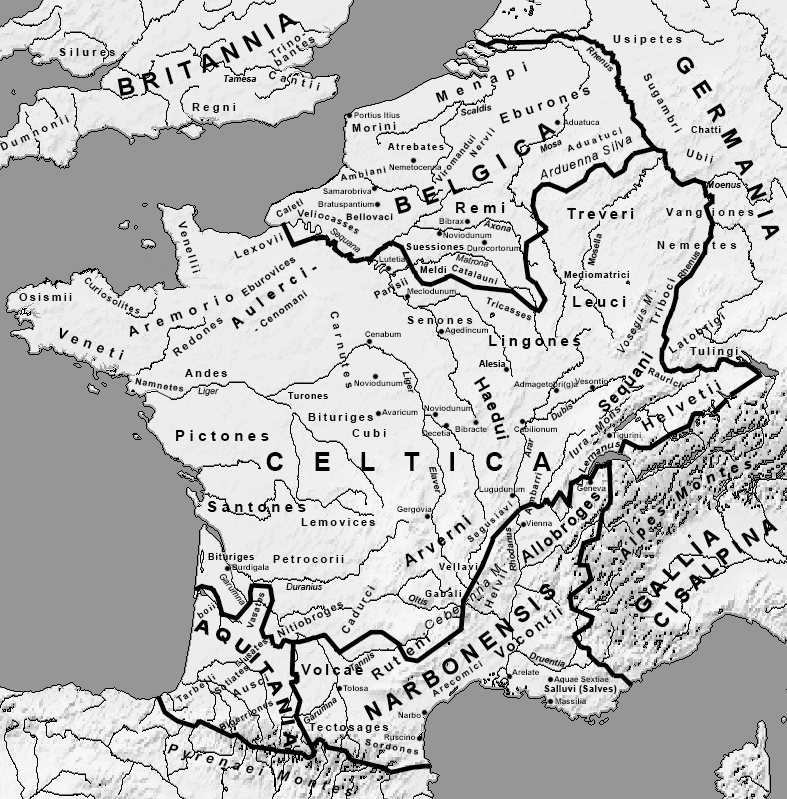
Map of tribes and boundaries in Gaul, circa 1st century BC.

The Celts (Ancient Greek Κέλτοι Keltoi; Latin Celtae, Galli, Galati) were tribes and tribal confederations of ancient Europe, who resided in west central Europe in the Late Bronze Age and early Iron Age (the Hallstatt culture). In the La Tène period they expanded, through migration and cultural transmission, to the British Isles, northern Iberia, the Balkan peninsula and Asia Minor. The Greeks and Romans commonly referred to areas under Celtic rule as Κελτική or Celticum. They had a relatively uniform material culture (especially in the La Tène period) and non-material culture (customs and norms), which differed from neighbouring peoples like the Italians, Etruscans, Illyrians, Greeks, Iberians, Germans, Thracians, and Scythians.

=== Emergence of writing ===
Celtic languages were first written in the closely-related Lepontic language, using an Old Italic script. These inscriptions appeared in Northern Italy, in the 6th century BC. Gaulish is found similarly written in this Cisalpine region after the Gaulish invasions of the 4th to 3rd centuries BC.

The Gaulish language also appears in the Greek alphabet around Massalia, in the 3rd century BC, with Gallo-Greek inscriptions peaking a century later, after the Roman conquest of Provinicia.

Caesar documents that the Helvetii kept census records in Greek script. He also notes that the Gaulish druids used the Greek alphabet for private and public transactions, with the important exception of druidic doctrines, which could only be memorised and were not allowed to be written down. According to the Recueil des inscriptions gauloises nearly three-quarters of Gaulish inscriptions (disregarding coins) are in the Greek alphabet.

=== Roman period ===
The Roman period marked the widespread adoption of the Latin alphabet for writing Gaulish, resulting in a proliferation of inscriptions that contain Gaulish names, as well as some more extensive surviving documents (see Corpus section). The inscriptions from this period form the bulk of written evidence for the Gaulish language.

The word "Gaulish" (gallicum) as a language term is first explicitly used in the Appendix Vergiliana in a poem referring to Gaulish letters of the alphabet. (Note: Virgil, Catalepton II: "THAT lover of Corinthian words, That—well, that spouter, for that all of Thucydides, a tyrant of Attic fever: that he wrongly fixed on the Gallic tau and min and spin, thus he mixed all those words for [his] brother".)

=== Decline ===
The rise of Gaulish as a written language coincided with the start of its overall decline. Latin was quickly adopted by the greater Gaulish élite after the Gallic Wars, to maintain power and influence under the Roman Empire, while trilingualism had been noted in southern Gaul as early as the 1st century BC. Some linguistic commonalities between Gaulish and Latin may have also contributed to the adoption of Latin among the local populace, though the speed of Romanisation ultimately varied by region.

Despite considerable Romanisation of the local material culture, the Gaulish language is held to have survived and coexisted with spoken Latin throughout the centuries of Roman rule of Gaul. Some sources remarked on the persistence of Gaulish as a mother tongue during the Roman period:

- In the last quarter of the 2nd century, Irenaeus, bishop of Lugdunum (present-day Lyon), apologised for his inadequate Greek, being "resident among the Keltae and accustomed for the most part to use a barbarous dialect". (Note: Adv. haer., book I, praef. 3: "You will not expect from me, as a resident among the Keltae, and accustomed for the most part to use a barbarous dialect, any display of rhetoric")
- Saint Jerome (writing in AD 386/387) remarked in a commentary on St. Paul's Epistle to the Galatians that the Belgic Treveri spoke almost the same language as the Galatians, rather than Latin. (Note: Jerome (Hieronymus): "Apart from the Greek language, which is spoken throughout the entire East, the Galatians have their own language, almost the same as the Treveri".) This agrees with an earlier report in AD 180 by Lucian. (Note: Lucian reports on Alexandros (around AD 180) using interpreters in Paphlagonia (northeast of Galatia): ἀλλὰ καὶ βαρβάροις πολλάκις ἔρχησεν, εἴ τις τῇ πατρίῳ ἔροιτο φωνῇ, Συριστὶ ἢ Κελτιστὶ, ῥᾳδίως ἐξευρίσκων τινὰς ἐπιδημοῦντας ὁμοεθνεῖς τοῖς δεδωκόσιν. "But he [Alexandros] gave oracles to barbarians many times, given that if someone asked a question in his [the questioner's] native language, in Syrian or in Celtic, he [Alexandros] easily found residents of the same people as the questioners")

The ultimate disappearance of Gaulish is unknown, but estimated to have occurred sometime around or after the middle of the 1st millennium AD. Some contemporaneous literature comment on the perceived status of Latin over Gaulish:

- In an AD 474 letter to his brother-in-law, Sidonius Apollinaris, bishop of Clermont in Auvergne, says that in his younger years, "our nobles ... resolved to forsake the barbarous Celtic dialect", evidently in favour of eloquent Latin. (Note: Sidonius: I will forget that your schooldays brought us a veritable confluence of learners and the learned from all quarters, and that if our nobles were imbued with the love of eloquence and poetry, if they resolved to forsake the barbarous Celtic dialect, it was to your personality that they owed all.) (Note: Alternate translation according to David Stifter: ... sermonis Celtici squamam depositura nobilitas nunc oratorio stilo, nunc etiam Camenalibus modis imbuebatur '... the (Arvernian) nobility, wishing to cast off the scales of Celtic speech, will now be imbued (by him = brother-in-law Ecdicius) with oratorial style, even with tunes of the Muses'.)

=== Late survivals ===
Though not widely accepted, some scholars posit late survivals of Gaulish in certain locales.

Bonnaud maintains that Latinization occurred earlier in Provence and in major urban centers, while Gaulish persisted longest, possibly as late as the tenth century with evidence for continued use according to Bonnaud continuing into the ninth century, in Langres and the surrounding regions, the regions between Clermont, Argenton and Bordeaux, and in Armorica. Fleuriot, Falc'hun, and Gvozdanovic likewise maintained a late survival in Armorica and language contact of some form with the ascendant Breton language; however, it has been noted that there is little uncontroversial evidence supporting a relatively late survival specifically in Brittany whereas there is uncontroversial evidence that supports the relatively late survival of Gaulish in the Swiss Alps and in regions in Central Gaul. Drawing from these data, which include the mapping of substrate vocabulary as evidence, Kerkhof argues that we may "tentatively" posit a survival of Gaulish-speaking communities "at least into the sixth century" in pockets of mountainous regions of the Central Massif, the Jura, and the Swiss Alps.

== Legacy ==
French retains a vocabulary of about 150 to 180 known words of Gaulish origin, most of which concern pastoral or quotidian life. If dialectal and derived words are included, the number rises to around 400 words, making it the highest among the Romance languages.

=== Modern usage ===
In an interview, Swiss folk metal band Eluveitie said that some of their songs are written in a reconstructed form of Gaulish. The band asks linguistic scholars for help in writing songs in the language. The name of the band comes from graffiti on a vessel from Mantua (c. 300 BC). The inscription in Etruscan letters reads eluveitie, which has been interpreted as the Etruscan form of the Celtic (h)elvetios ("the Helvetian"), presumably referring to a man of Helvetian descent living in Mantua.

== Corpus ==
=== Summary of sources ===
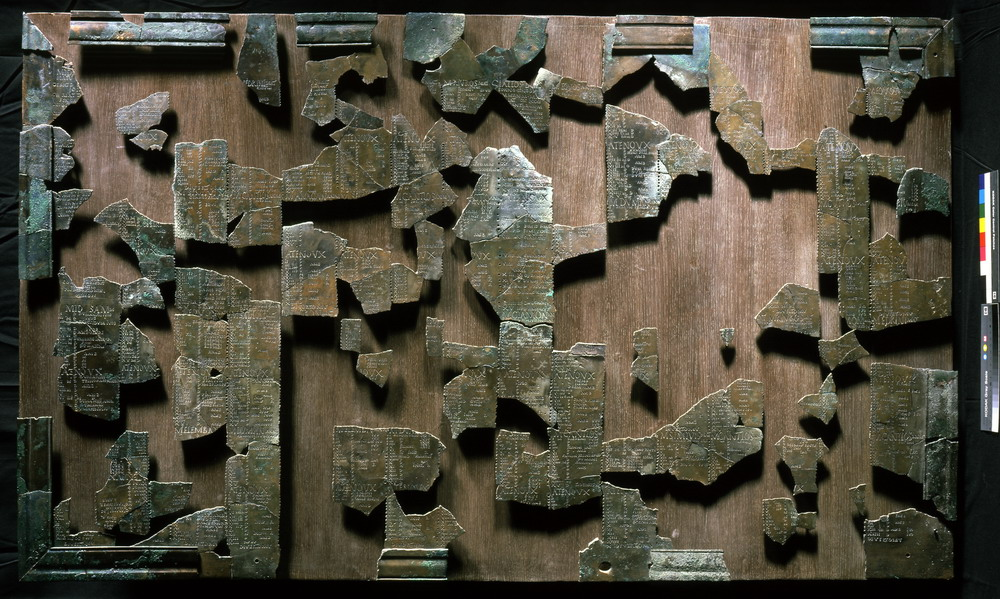
The re-assembled tablet of the Coligny calendar

According to Recueil des inscriptions gauloises more than 760 Gaulish inscriptions have been found throughout France, with the notable exception of Aquitaine, and in northern Italy. Inscriptions include short dedications, funerary monuments, proprietary statements, and expressions of human sentiments, but also some longer documents of a legal or magical-religious nature, the three longest being the Larzac tablet, the Chamalières tablet and the Lezoux dish. The most famous Gaulish record is the Coligny calendar, a fragmented bronze tablet dating from the 2nd century AD and providing the names of Celtic months over a five-year span; it is a lunisolar calendar trying to synchronize the solar year and the lunar month by inserting a thirteenth month every two and a half years. There is also a relatively long (11 lines) inscribed tile from Châteaubleau that has been interpreted as a curse or alternatively as a sort of wedding proposal.

Many inscriptions are only a few words (often names) in rote phrases, and many are fragmentary. It is clear from the subject matter of the records that the language was in use at all levels of society.

Other sources contribute to knowledge of Gaulish: Greek and Latin authors mention Gaulish words, personal and tribal names, and toponyms. A short Gaulish-Latin vocabulary (about 20 entries headed De nominib[us] Gallicis) called "Endlicher's Glossary" is preserved in a 9th-century manuscript (Öst. Nationalbibliothek, MS 89 fol. 189v).

- According to the Vita Sancti Symphoriani, Symphorian of Augustodunum (present-day Autun) was executed on 22 August 178 for his Christian faith. While he was being led to his execution, "his venerable mother admonished him from the wall assiduously and notable to all (?), saying in the Gaulish speech: Son, son, Symphorianus, think of your God!" (uenerabilis mater sua de muro sedula et nota illum uoce Gallica monuit dicens: 'nate, nate Synforiane, mentobeto to diuo'). The Gaulish sentence has been transmitted in a corrupt state in the various manuscripts; as it stands, it has been reconstructed by Thurneysen. According to David Stifter (2012), *mentobeto looks like a Proto-Romance verb derived from Latin mens, mentis 'mind' and habere 'to have', and it cannot be excluded that the whole utterance is an early variant of Romance, or a mixture of Romance and Gaulish, instead of being an instance of pure Gaulish. On the other hand, nate is attested in Gaulish (for example in Endlicher's Glossary), and the author of the Vita Sancti Symphoriani, whether or not fluent in Gaulish, evidently expects a non-Latin language to have been spoken at the time.

=== Inscriptions ===
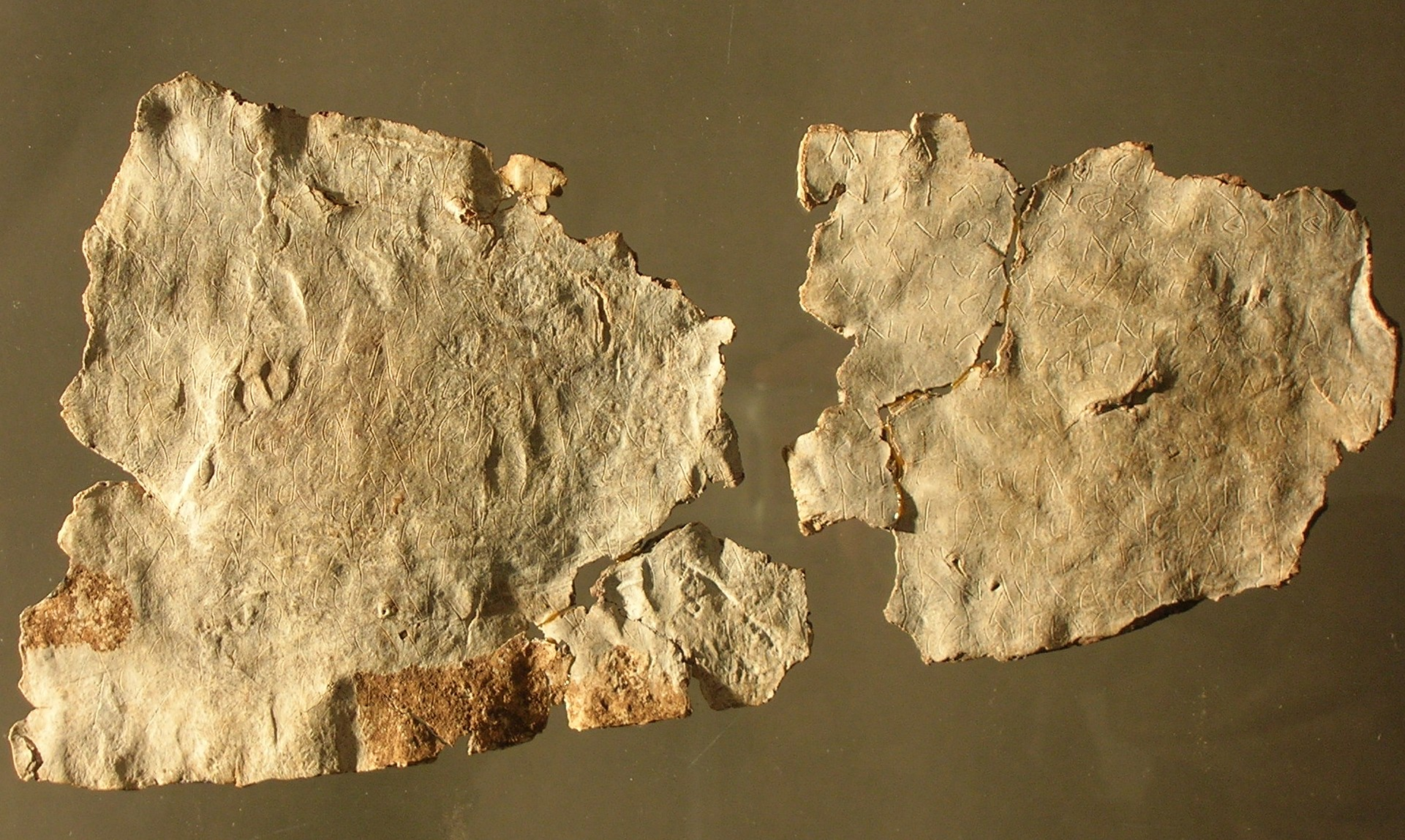
The Curse tablet from L'Hospitalet-du-Larzac, Musée de Millau

Gaulish inscriptions are edited in the Recueil des inscriptions gauloises (RIG), in four volumes, comprising text (in the Latin, Greek, and Etruscan alphabets) written on public monuments, private instrumentum, two calendars, and coins.

The longest known Gaulish text is the Larzac tablet, found in 1983 in l'Hospitalet-du-Larzac, France. It is inscribed in Roman cursive on both sides of two small sheets of lead. Probably a curse tablet (defixio), it clearly mentions relationships between female names, for example aia duxtir adiegias [...] adiega matir aiias (Aia, daughter of Adiega... Adiega, mother of Aia) and seems to contain incantations regarding one Severa Tertionicna and a group of women (often thought to be a rival group of witches), but the exact meaning of the text remains unclear.

The Coligny calendar was found in 1897 in Coligny, France, with a statue identified as Mars. The calendar contains Gaulish words but Roman numerals, permitting translations such as lat evidently meaning days, and mid month. Months of 30 days were marked matus, "lucky", months of 29 days anmatus, "unlucky", based on comparison with Middle Welsh mad and anfad, but the meaning could here also be merely descriptive, "complete" and "incomplete".

The pottery at La Graufesenque is the most important source for Gaulish numerals. Potters shared furnaces and kept tallies inscribed in Latin cursive on ceramic plates, referring to kiln loads numbered 1 to 10:

- 1st cintus, cintuxos (Welsh cynt "before", cyntaf "first", Breton kent "in front" kentañ "first", Cornish kynsa "first", Old Irish céta, Irish céad "first")
- 2nd allos, alos (Welsh ail, Breton eil, Old Irish aile "other", Irish eile)
- 3rd tri[tios] (Welsh trydydd, Breton trede, Old Irish treide)
- 4th petuar[ios] (Welsh pedwerydd, Breton pevare)
- 5th pinpetos (Welsh pumed, Breton pempet, Old Irish cóiced)
- 6th suexos (possibly mistaken for suextos, but see Rezé inscription below; Welsh chweched, Breton c'hwec'hved, Old Irish seissed)
- 7th sextametos (Welsh seithfed, Breton seizhved, Old Irish sechtmad)
- 8th oxtumeto[s] (Welsh wythfed, Breton eizhved, Old Irish ochtmad)
- 9th namet[os] (Welsh nawfed, Breton naved, Old Irish nómad)
- 10th decametos, decometos (CIb dekametam, Welsh degfed, Breton degvet, Old Irish dechmad)

The lead inscription from Rezé (dated to the 2nd century, at the mouth of the Loire, 450 kilometres (280 mi) northwest of La Graufesenque) is evidently an account or a calculation and contains quite different ordinals:

- 3rd trilu
- 4th paetrute
- 5th pixte
- 6th suexxe, etc.

Other Gaulish numerals attested in Latin inscriptions include *petrudecametos "fourteenth" (rendered as petrudecameto, with Latinized dative-ablative singular ending) and *triconts "thirty" (rendered as tricontis, with a Latinized ablative plural ending; compare Irish tríocha). A Latinized phrase for a "ten-night festival of (Apollo) Grannus", decamnoctiacis Granni, is mentioned in a Latin inscription from Limoges. A similar formation is to be found in the Coligny calendar, in which mention is made of a trinox[...] Samoni "three-night (festival?) of (the month of) Samonios". As is to be expected, the ancient Gaulish language was more similar to Latin than modern Celtic languages are to modern Romance languages. The ordinal numerals in Latin, used when more than two objects are counted, are prīmus, secundus, tertius, quārtus, quīntus, sextus, septimus, octāvus, nōnus, and decimus. (Note: When contrasting two objects, Latin would use prior "first (of two); former", and alter "second (of two); latter".)

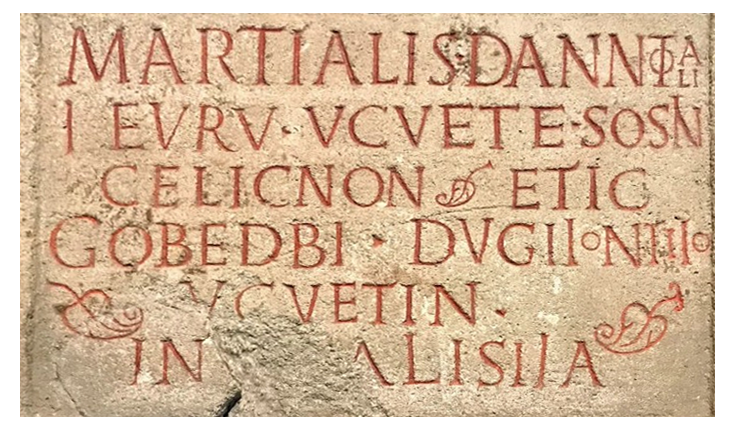
The Martialis Dannotali inscription

An inscription in stone from Alise-Sainte-Reine (first century AD) reads:

MARTIALIS DANNOTALI IEVRV VCVETE SOSIN CELICNON
ETIC GOBEDBI DVGIIONTIIO VCVETIN IN ALISIIA

"Martialis [son] of Dannotalos offered to [the god] Ucuetis this edifice,
and to the smiths (GOBEDBI dative plural; compare Old Irish goba) who honour (?) Ucuetis in Alisia"

A number of short inscriptions are found on spindle whorls and are among the most recent finds in the Gaulish language. Spindle whorls were apparently given to girls by their suitors and bear such inscriptions as:

- moni gnatha gabi / buððutton imon (RIG l. 119) "my girl, take my penis(?)" (or "little kiss"?)
- geneta imi / daga uimpi (RIG l. 120) '"I am a young girl, good (and) pretty."

A gold ring found in Thiaucourt seems to express the wearer's undying loyalty to her lover:

- Adiantunne, ni exuertinin appisetu "May (this ring) never see (me) turn away (from you), Adiantunnos!"

Inscriptions found in Switzerland are rare. The most notable inscription found in Helvetic parts is the Bern zinc tablet, inscribed ΔΟΒΝΟΡΗΔΟ ΓΟΒΑΝΟ ΒΡΕΝΟΔΩΡ ΝΑΝΤΑΡΩΡ (Dobnorēdo gobano brenodōr nantarōr) and apparently dedicated to Gobannus, the Celtic god of metalwork. Furthermore, there is a statue of a seated goddess with a bear, Artio, found in Muri bei Bern, with a Latin inscription DEAE ARTIONI LIVINIA SABILLINA, suggesting a Gaulish Artiū "Bear (goddess)".

Some coins with Gaulish inscriptions in the Greek alphabet have also been found in Switzerland, e.g. RIG IV Nos. 92 (Lingones) and 267 (Leuci). A sword, dating to the La Tène period, was found in Port, near Biel/Bienne, with its blade inscribed with ΚΟΡΙϹΙΟϹ (Korisios), probably the name of the smith.

== Phonology ==
Vowel phonemes of Gaulish
	Monophthong			Diphthong	
	Front	Central	Back	Front	Back
Close	i iː		u uː	ei	ou
Mid	e eː		o oː	oi	eu
Open		a aː		ai	au

Consonant phonemes of Gaulish
		Labial	Coronal	Dorsal
Nasal		m	n	(ŋ)
Stop	voiceless	p	t	k
Stop	voiced	b	d	ɡ
Affricate			ts	
Fricative			s	(x^{1})
Sonorant	median	w	r	j
Sonorant	lateral		l	

1. [x] is an allophone of /k/ before /t/.

The diphthongs all transformed over the historical period. ai and oi changed into long ī and eu merged with ou, both becoming long ō. ei became long ē. In general, long diphthongs became short diphthongs and then long vowels. Long vowels shortened before nasals in coda.

Other transformations include unstressed i became e, ln became ll, a stop + s became ss, and a nasal + velar became [ŋ] + velar.

The lenis plosives seem to have been voiceless, unlike in Latin, which distinguished lenis occlusives with a voiced realization from fortis occlusives with a voiceless realization, which caused confusions like Glanum for Clanum, vergobretos for vercobreto, Britannia for Pritannia.

=== Sound laws ===
- Gaulish changed the Proto-Celtic voiceless labiovelar *kʷ (from both PIE *kʷ and PIE *k'w) to p, a development also observed in the Brittonic languages (as well as Greek and some Italic languages like the Osco-Umbrian languages), while other Celtic languages retained the labiovelar. Thus, the Gaulish word for "son" was mapos, contrasting with Primitive Irish *maq(q)os (attested genitive case maq(q)i), which became mac (gen. mic) in modern Irish. In modern Welsh the word map, mab (or its contracted form ap, ab) is found in surnames. Similarly one Gaulish word for "horse" was epos (in Old Breton eb and modern Breton keneb "pregnant mare") while Old Irish has ech, the modern Irish language and Scottish Gaelic each, and Manx egh, all derived from proto-Indo-European *h₁éḱwos. The retention or innovation of this sound does not necessarily signify a close genetic relationship between the languages; Goidelic and Brittonic are, for example, both Insular Celtic languages and quite closely related.
- The Proto-Celtic voiced labiovelar *gʷ (from PIE *gʷʰ) became w: *gʷediūmi → uediiumi "I pray" (but Celtiberian Ku.e.z.o.n.to /gueðonto/ < *gʷʰedʰ-y-ont 'imploring, pleading', Old Irish guidim, Welsh gweddi "to pray").
- PIE *ds, *dz became /ts/, spelled ð: *neds-samo → neððamon (cf. Irish nesamh "nearest", Welsh nesaf "next", Breton nesañ "next").
- PIE *ew became eu or ou, and later ō: PIE *tewtéh₂ → *teutā/*toutā → tōtā "tribe" (cf. Irish túath, Welsh tud "people").
- PIE *ey became ei, ē and ī PIE *treyes → treis → trī (cf. Irish trí "three").
- Intervocalic /st/ became the affricate [ts] (alveolar stop + fricative), intervocalic /sr/ became [ðr], and /str/ became [θr].
- Labial and velar stops merged into the fricative [χ] when occurring before /t/ or /s/.

== Orthography ==
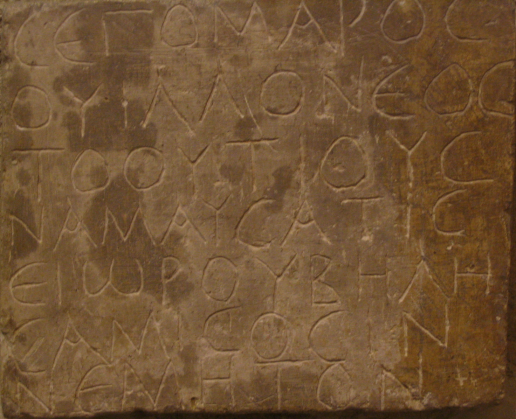
RIG G-172 Gallo-Greek inscription ϹΕΓΟΜΑΡΟϹ ΟΥΙΛΛΟΝΕΟϹ ΤΟΟΥΤΙΟΥϹ ΝΑΜΑΥϹΑΤΙϹ ΕΙꙌΡΟΥ ΒΗΛΗϹΑΜΙ ϹΟϹΙΝ ΝΕΜΗΤΟΝ (Segomaros Uilloneos toutius Namausatis eiōru Bēlēsami sosin nemēton) "Segomaros, son of Uillū, citizen (toutious) of Namausos, dedicated this sanctuary to Belesama"

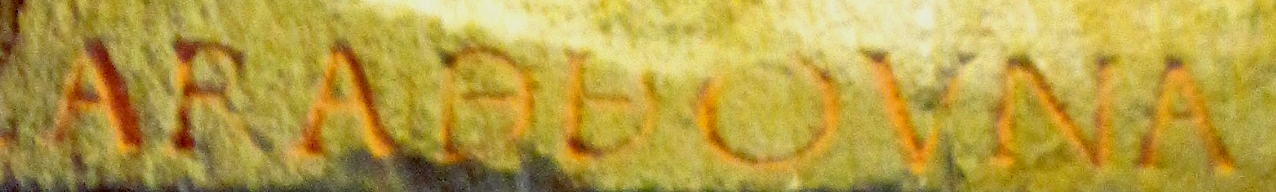
The name ARAꟇꟇOVNA on a Gaulish tomb, illustrating the use of the tau gallicum (in this case doubled)

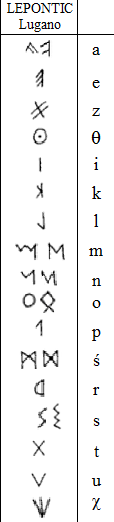
Lepontic alphabet

=== Lugano alphabet ===
The Lugano alphabet of Lugano was used in Cisalpine Gaul for Lepontic:

AEIKLMNOPRSTΘVXZ

The alphabet of Lugano does not distinguish voicing in stops: P represents /b/ or /p/, T is for /d/ or /t/, K for /g/ or /k/. Z is probably for /tˢ/. U /u/ and V /w/ are distinguished in only one early inscription. Θ is probably for /t/ and X for /g/ (Lejeune 1971, Solinas 1985).

=== Greek alphabet ===
The Eastern Greek alphabet was used in southern Gallia Narbonensis.

The Gallo-Greek alphabet
Letter	Pronunciation		Usage notes
Letter	Phoneme	IPA	Usage notes
Α	a	[a]	
Β	b	[b]	
Γ	g	[ɡ]	
Δ	d	[d]	
Ε	e	[e]	
Ε	ē	[eː]	
Ζ	z	[z]	
Η	e	[e]	
Η	ē	[eː]	
Θ			Never used alone
ΘΘ	ts	[t͡s]	
Ι	i	[i]	
Ι	ī	[iː]	
Ι	y	[j]	
ΕΙ	i	[i]	
ΕΙ	ī	[iː]	
Κ	k	[k]	
Λ	l	[l]	
Μ	m	[m]	
Ν	n	[n]	
Ξ	Earlier: xs	[xs]	Not attested. Existence is hinted by later use of Latin letters -XS- to denote /xs/
Ξ	Later: ks	[ks]	Used in parallel with -ΓϹ-
ΓϹ	ks	[ks]	
Ο	o	[o]	
Ο	ō	[oː]	
Π	p	[p]	
Ρ	r	[r]	
Ϲ	s	[s]	
Τ	t	[t]	
Υ			Never used alone
ΟΥ	u	[u]	Also used to denote the final element of the diphthongs: -ΑΟΥ- (/au/); -ΕΟΥ- and -ΗΟΥ- (/eu/); -ΟΟΥ- and -ΩΟΥ- (/ou/)
ΟΥ	w	[w]	Also used to denote the final element of the diphthongs: -ΑΟΥ- (/au/); -ΕΟΥ- and -ΗΟΥ- (/eu/); -ΟΟΥ- and -ΩΟΥ- (/ou/)
Χ	x	[x]	Used only in the consonant cluster -ΧΤ- (/xt/)
Ω	o	[o]	
Ω	ō	[oː]	

=== Roman alphabet ===
The Latin alphabet (monumental and cursive) of Roman Gaul used the following letters:

ABCDꟇEFGHIKLMNOPQRSTVXZ
abcdꟈefghiklmnopqrstvxz

G and K are sometimes used interchangeably (especially after R). Ꟈ/ꟈ, ds and s may represent /ts/ and/or /dz/. X, x is for [x] or /ks/. Q is only used rarely (Sequanni, Equos) and may represent an archaism (a retained *kʷ), borrowings from Latin, or, as in Latin, an alternate spelling of -cu- (for original /kuu/, /kou/, or /kom-u/). Ꟈ is the letter tau gallicum, the Gaulish affricate. The letter ꟉꟉ/ꟊꟊ occurs in some inscriptions.

== Morphology ==
Gaulish had some areal (and genetic, see Indo-European and the controversial Italo-Celtic hypothesis) similarity to Latin grammar, and the French historian Ferdinand Lot argued that this helped the rapid adoption of Vulgar Latin in Roman Gaul among the populace.

=== Noun cases ===
Gaulish had seven cases: the nominative, vocative, accusative, genitive, dative, instrumental and locative. Greater epigraphical evidence attests common cases (nominative and accusative) and common stems (-o- and -a- stems) than for cases less frequently used in inscriptions or rarer -i-, -n- and -r- stems. The following table summarises the reconstructed endings for the words *toṷtā "tribe, people", *mapos "boy, son", *ṷātis "seer", *gutus "voice", and *brātīr "brother".

Case	Singular					Plural				
Case	ā-stem	o-stem	i-stem	u-stem	r-stem	ā-stem	o-stem	i-stem	u-stem	r-stem
Nominative	*toṷtā	*mapos (n. *-on)	*ṷātis	*gutus	*brātīr	*toṷtās	*mapoi	*ṷātīs	*gutoṷes	*brāteres
Vocative	*toṷtā	*mape	*ṷāti	*gutu	*brāter	*toṷtās	*mapoi	*ṷātīs	*gutoṷes	*brāteres
Accusative	*toṷtan ~ *toṷtam > *toṷtim	*mapon ~ *mapom (n. *-on)	*ṷātin ~ *ṷātim	*gutun ~ *gutum	*brāterem	*toṷtās	*mapōs > *mapūs	*ṷātīs	*gutūs	*brāterās
Genitive	toṷtās > *toṷtiās	*mapoiso > *mapi	*ṷātēis	*gutoṷs > *gutōs	*brātros	*toṷtanom	*mapon	*ṷātiom	*gutoṷom	*brātron
Dative	*toṷtai > *toṷtī	*mapūi > *mapū	*ṷātei > *ṷāte	*gutoṷei > gutoṷ	*brātrei	*toṷtābo(s)	*mapobo(s)	*ṷātibo(s)	*gutuibo(s)	*brātrebo(s)
Instrumental	*toṷtia > *toṷtī	*mapū	*ṷātī	*gutū	*brātri	*toṷtābi(s)	*mapuis > *mapūs	*ṷātibi(s)	*gutuibi(s)	*brātrebi(s)
Locative	*toṷtī	*mapei > *mapē	*ṷātei	*gutoṷ	*brātri	*toṷtābo(s)	*mapois	*ṷātibo(s)	*gutubo(s)	*brātrebo(s)

In some cases, a historical evolution is attested; for example, the dative singular of a-stems is -āi in the oldest inscriptions, becoming first *-ăi and finally -ī as in Irish a-stem nouns with attenuated (slender) consonants: nom. lámh "hand, arm" (cf. Gaul. lāmā) and dat. láimh (< *lāmi; cf. Gaul. lāmāi > *lāmăi > lāmī). Further, the plural instrumental had begun to encroach on the dative plural (dative atrebo and matrebo vs. instrumental gobedbi and suiorebe), and in the modern Insular Languages, the instrumental form is known to have completely replaced the dative.

For o-stems, Gaulish also innovated the pronominal ending for the nominative plural -oi and genitive singular -ī in place of expected -ōs and -os still present in Celtiberian (-oś, -o). In a-stems, the inherited genitive singular -as is attested but was subsequently replaced by -ias as in Insular Celtic. The expected genitive plural -a-om appears innovated as -anom (vs. Celtiberian -aum).

There also appears to be a dialectal equivalence between -n and -m endings in accusative singular endings particularly, with Transalpine Gaulish favouring -n, and Cisalpine favouring -m. In genitive plurals the difference between -n and -m relies on the length of the preceding vowel, with longer vowels taking -m over -n (in the case of -anom this is a result of its innovation from -a-om).

=== Verbs ===
Gaulish verbs have present, future, perfect, and imperfect tenses; indicative, subjunctive, optative and imperative moods; and active and passive voices. Verbs show a number of innovations as well. The Indo-European s-aorist became the Gaulish t-preterit, formed by merging an old third-person singular imperfect ending -t- to a third-person singular perfect ending -u or -e and subsequent affixation to all forms of the t-preterit tense. Similarly, the s-preterit is formed from the extension of -ss (originally from the third person singular) and the affixation of -it to the third-person singular (to distinguish it as such). Third-person plurals are also marked by addition of -s in the preterit.

== Syntax ==
=== Word order ===
Most Gaulish sentences seem to consist of a subject–verb–object word order:

Subject	Verb	Indirect Object	Direct Object
martialis dannotali	ieuru	ucuete	sosin celicnon
Martialis, son of Dannotalos, dedicated this edifice to Ucuetis

Some, however, have patterns such as verb–subject–object (as in living Insular Celtic languages) or with the verb last. The latter can be seen as a survival from an earlier stage in the language, very much like the more archaic Celtiberian language.

Sentences with the verb first can be interpreted, however, as indicating a special purpose, such as an imperative, emphasis, contrast, and so on. Also, the verb may contain or be next to an enclitic pronoun or with "and", "but", etc. According to J. F. Eska, Gaulish was certainly not a verb-second language, as the following shows:

ratin briuatiom	frontu tarbetisonios	ie(i)uru
NP.Acc.Sg.	NP.Nom.Sg.	V.3rd Sg.
Frontus Tarbetisonios dedicated the board of the bridge.

Whenever there is a pronoun object element, it is next to the verb, as per Vendryes' Restriction. The general Celtic grammar shows Wackernagel's rule, so putting the verb at the beginning of the clause or sentence. As in Old Irish and traditional literary Welsh, the verb can be preceded by a particle with no real meaning by itself but originally used to make the utterance easier.

sioxt-i	albanos	panna(s)	extra tuꟈ(on)	CCC
V-Pro.Neut.	NP.Nom.Sg.	NP.Fem.Acc.Pl.	PP	Num.
Albanos added them, vessels beyond the allotment (in the amount of) 300.

to-me-declai	obalda	natina
Conn.-Pro.1st.Sg.Acc.-V.3rd.Sg.	NP.Nom.Sg.	Appositive
Obalda, (their) dear daughter, set me up.

According to Eska's model, Vendryes' Restriction is believed to have played a large role in the development of Insular Celtic verb-subject-object word order. Other authorities such as John T. Koch, dispute that interpretation.

Considering that Gaulish is not a verb-final language, it is not surprising to find other "head-initial" features:

- Genitives follow their head nouns:

atom deuogdonion
The border of gods and men.

- The unmarked position for adjectives is after their head nouns:

toutious namausatis
citizen of Nîmes

- Prepositional phrases have the preposition, naturally, first:

in alixie
in Alesia

- Passive clauses:

uatiounui so nemetos commu escengilu
To Vatiounos this shrine (was dedicated) by Commos Escengilos

=== Subordination ===
Subordinate clauses follow the main clause and have an uninflected element (jo) to show the subordinate clause. This is attached to the first verb of the subordinate clause.

gobedbi	dugijonti-jo	ucuetin	in alisija
NP.Dat/Inst.Pl.	V.3rd.Pl.- Pcl.	NP.Acc.Sg.	PP
to the smiths who serve Ucuetis in Alisia

Jo is also used in relative clauses and to construct the equivalent of THAT-clauses

scrisu-mi-jo	uelor
V.1st.Sg.-Pro.1st Sg.-Pcl.	V.1st Sg.
I wish that I spit

This element is found residually in the Insular Celtic languages and appears as an independent inflected relative pronoun in Celtiberian, thus:

- Welsh
  - modern sydd "which is" ← Middle Welsh yssyd ← *esti-jo
  - vs. Welsh ys "is" ← *esti
- Irish
  - Old Irish relative cartae "they love" ← *caront-jo
- Celtiberian
  - masc. nom. sing. ioś, masc. dat. sing. iomui, fem. acc. plural iaś

=== Clitics ===
Gaulish had object pronouns that affixed inside a word:

to-	so	-ko	-te
Conn.-	Pro.3rd Sg.Acc	PerfVZ	V.3rd Sg
he gave it

Disjunctive pronouns also occur as clitics: mi, tu, id. They act like the emphasizing particles known as notae augentes in the Insular Celtic languages.

dessu-	mii	-iis
V.1st.Sg.	Emph.-Pcl.1st Sg.Nom.	Pro.3rd Pl.Acc.
I prepare them

buet-	id
V.3rd Sg.Pres.Subjunc.-	Emph.Pcl.3rd Sg.Nom.Neut.
it should be

Clitic doubling is also found (along with left dislocation), when a noun antecedent referring to an inanimate object is nonetheless grammatically animate. (There is a similar construction in Old Irish.)

== See also ==
- Italo-Celtic
- Lepontic language
- Celtiberian language
- Languages of France
- List of English words of Gaulish origin
- List of French words of Gaulish origin
