= Ocelus =

Celtic god associated with Mars

Mars Ocelus
- Other names: Mars Lenus, Ocelus Vellaunus
- Major cult center: Venta Silurum, Luguvalium Carvetiorum
- Animals: Bird (goose)
- Gender: Male

Equivalents
- Roman: Mars
- Gaulish: Lenus

Ocelus is a Celtic god known from three inscriptions in Roman Britain. He is twice invoked on dedications at Caerwent: one stone is the base of a statue of which only a pair of human feet and a pair of goose feet survive. The invocation is to Mars Lenus or Ocelus Vellaunus and to the numen (divine spirit) of the emperor, and was dedicated on 23 August AD 152. The second Caerwent inscription dedicates an altar to Mars Ocelus. The god was also venerated at Carlisle, where he was once more equated with Mars and again linked to the imperial cult. So Ocelus seems to have been a British, perhaps Silurian god, associated with Mars, probably in the latter's Celtic capacity as a protector. At Caerwent he is linked with Lenus, a Treveran healing deity, and with Vellaunus, who is also recorded among the Gaulish Allobroges; the name "Vellaunus" has been glossed as 'chief' or 'commander'.

One of the Caerwent inscriptions reads as follows:

DEO / MARTI / OCELO / AEL(ius) AGVS/TINVS OP(tio) / V S L M
To the god Mars Ocelus, Aelius Agustinus, lieutenant, willingly and deservedly fulfilled his vow

(VSLM stands for uotum soluit libens merito, a familiar votive formula; an optio was an officer subordinate to a centurion.)
