= Instrumentum domesticum =

Tools for ordinary domestic use

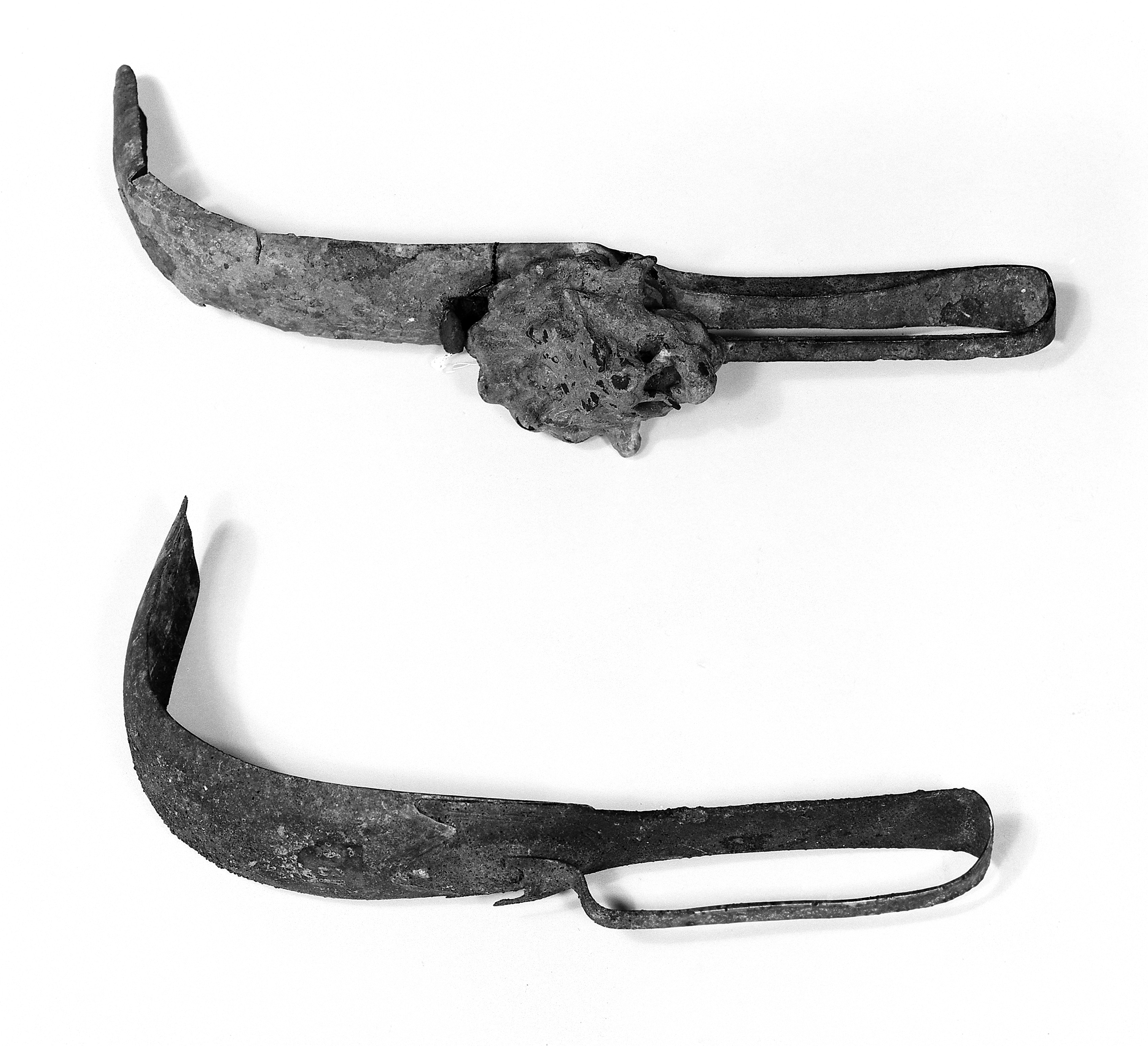
Two Roman strigils (scrapers for body cleansing with sand and oil) in bronze. One has a name on the handle, the other is decorated with a grotesque mask.

In archaeology, instrumentum domesticum (or simply instrumentum) refers to instruments, tools, and other artifacts intended for ordinary and domestic use (as opposed, for instance, to objects with religious, ceremonial, or monumental purposes). It also includes replicas of such objects made to be deposited in graves. The name is Latin for "domestic instruments", a term originally defined by Roman Law.

In epigraphy and paleography, the term refers to inscriptions that were written on such objects at or near the time of their use. In this sense, it also includes inscriptions in oracular objects (like the sortes of the Romans), talismans, and personal spells (like the Roman and Greek curse tablets). It does not however include objects whose function was to carry text, such as writing tablets and books.

== Gallery ==
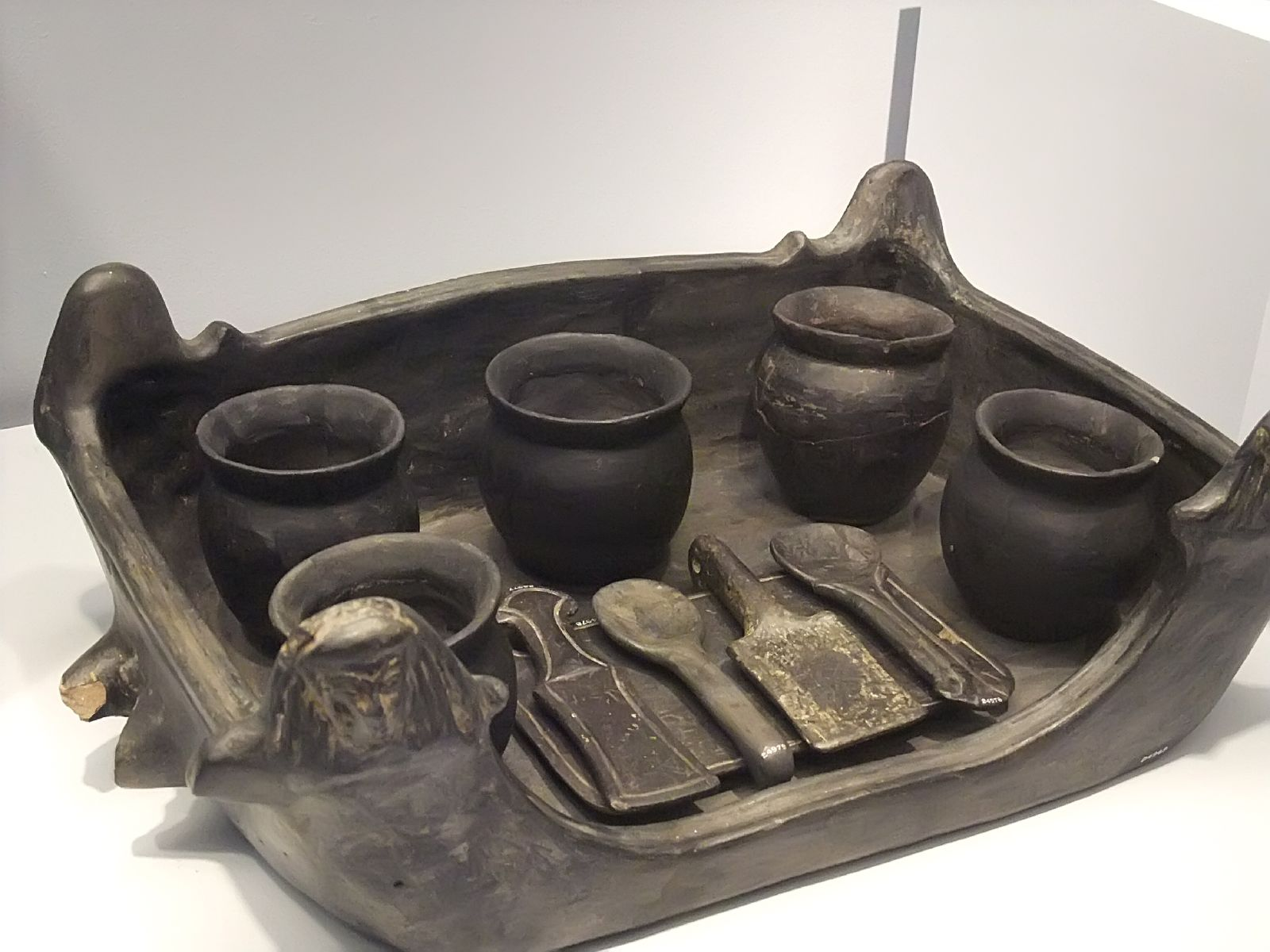
Clay replica of a serving tray (foculum) made for furnishing an Etruscan grave. The original tray and utensils may have been made of wood, metal, or other materials. Chiusi, Tomb A Group, 550-500 BCE.

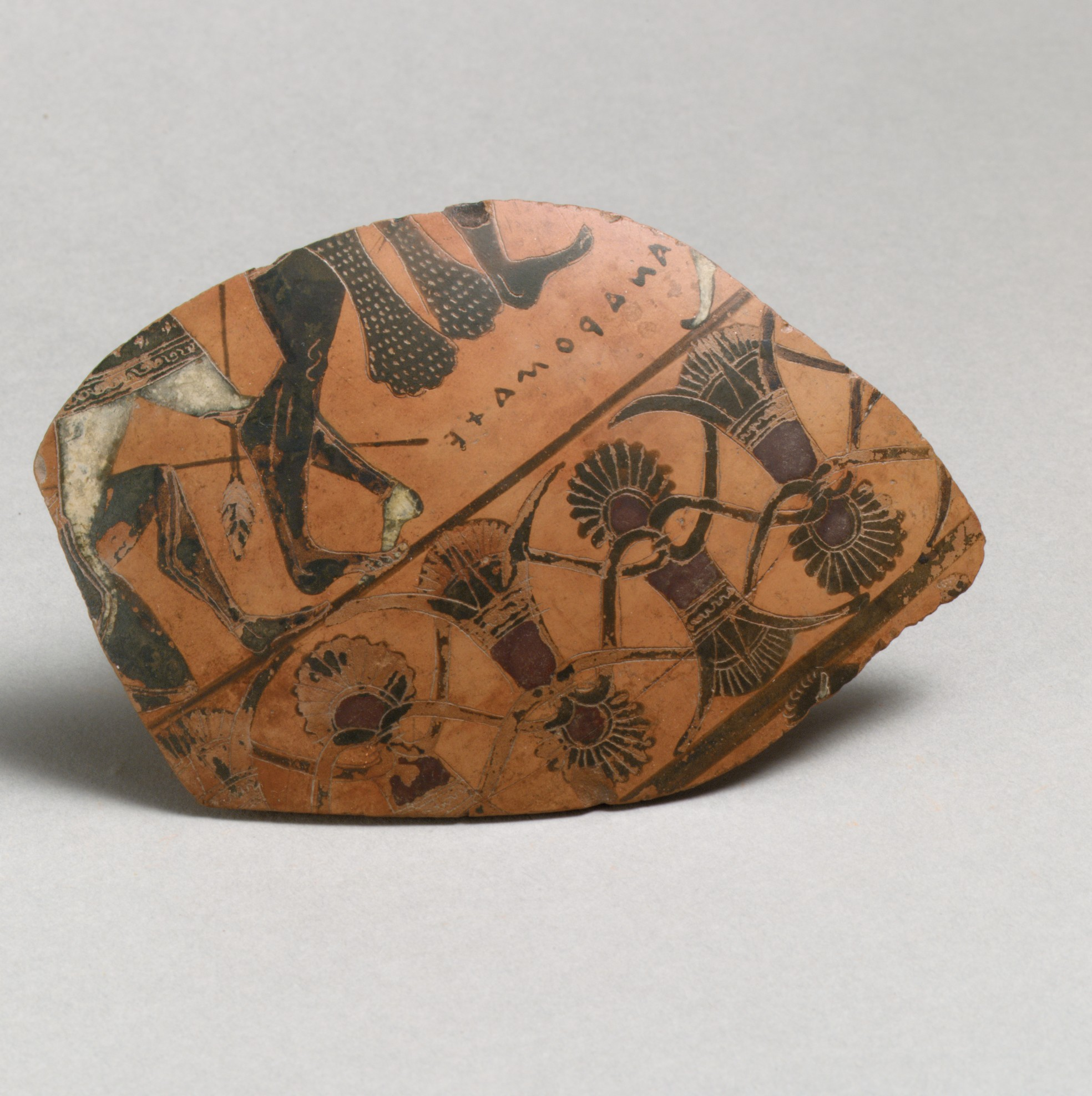
Fragment of a Tyrrhenian amphora depicting the fight between Herakles (Hercules), wearing a lion skin, and the Amazon warrior Andromache (whose name is written in Greek from right to left). 575-560 BCE.

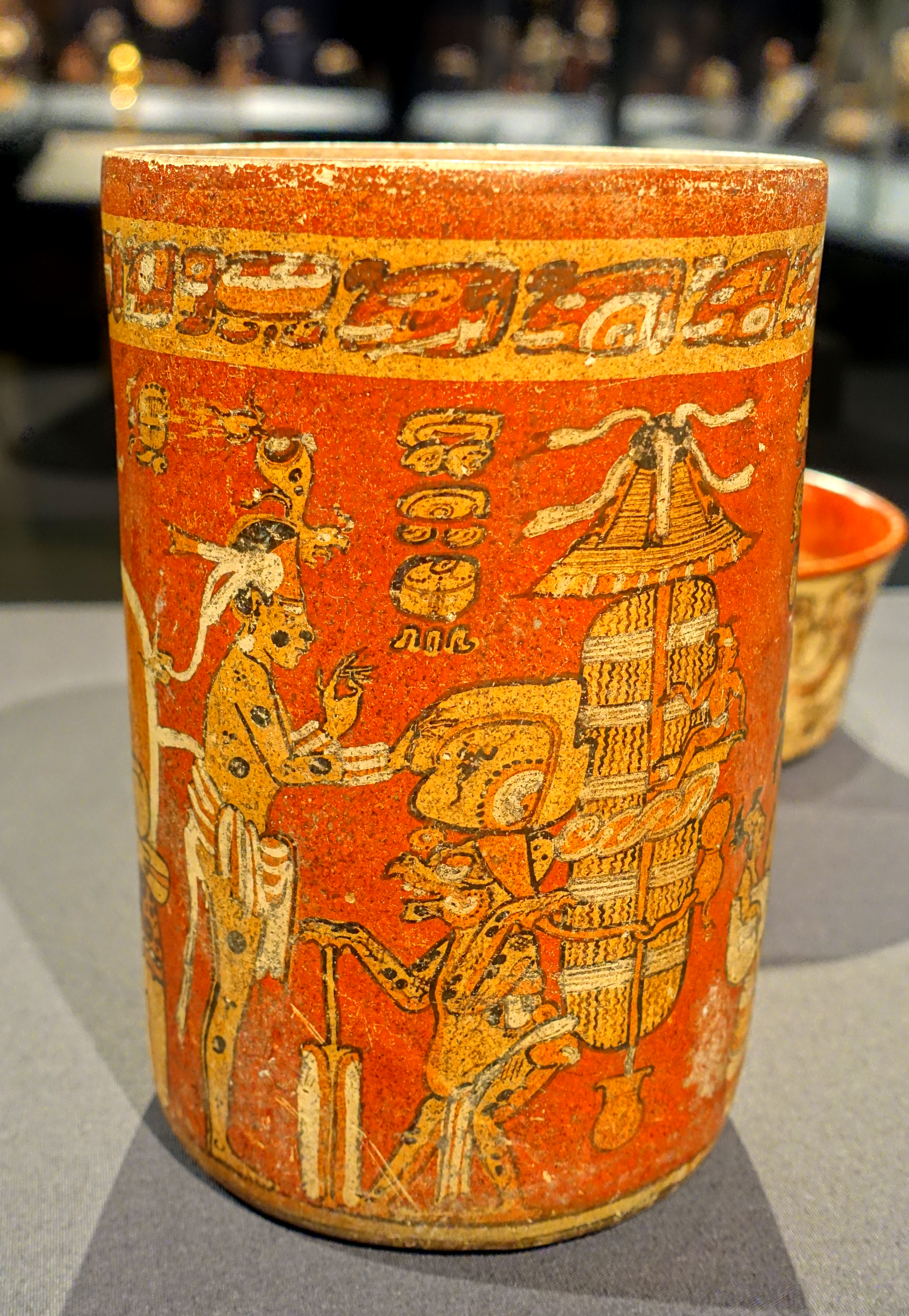
Maya chocolate cup with mythological scene and Mayan glyphs. El Zotz region, Guatemala, 650-800 CE.

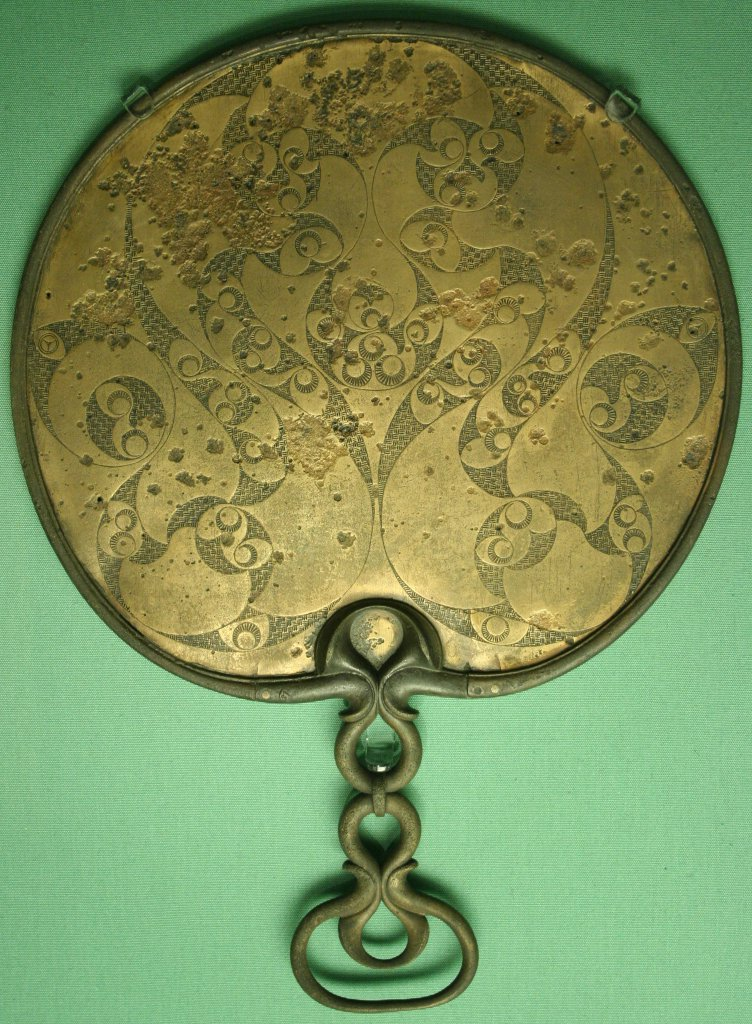
The Desborough Mirror, Romano-Celtic culture, found in England. 50 BCE - 50 CE.
