= Roman Inscriptions of Britain =

3-volume Roman corpus of inscriptions

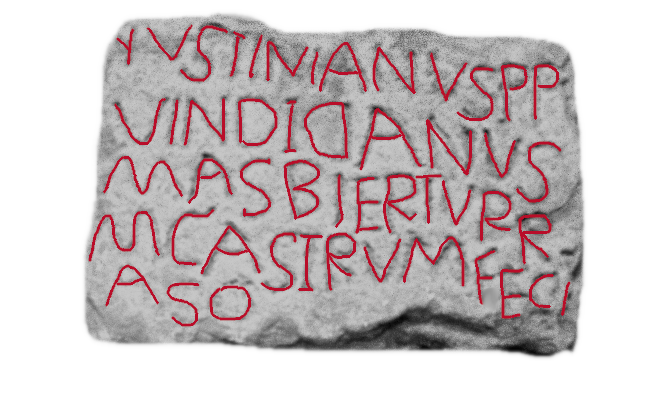
Script of ancient writing from Roman Britain

Roman Inscriptions of Britain is a 3-volume corpus of inscriptions found in Britain from the Roman period. It is an important reference work for all scholars of Roman Britain. This monumental work was initiated by Francis J. Haverfield, whose notebooks were bequeathed to the University of Oxford. The first volume, Inscriptions on Stone, was then edited by R. G. Collingwood and R. P. Wright with an addendum by Roger Tomlin. It was first published in 1965, with a new edition in 1995.

Volume II contains, broadly speaking, the inscriptions found on instrumentum domesticum (Latin for 'domestic utensils').

Volume III (edited by R. S. O. Tomlin, R. P. Wright, and M. W. C. Hassall) is a continuation of Volume I, containing all the lapidary inscriptions found from the closing date of Volume I up to 31 December 2006.

There are also indexes published to the volumes allowing the scholar quickly to reference nomina and cognomina, military units, imperial titles, emperors and consuls, deities and so forth. Entries are also cross-referenced to the CIL and other indexes and journals as necessary.

== See also ==
- Roman Imperial Coinage
