= Inciona =

Mythological figure

Inciona is a little-known Celtic goddess of the Treveran region. Her name is recorded as one of a pair of deities on two votive inscriptions from Luxembourg.

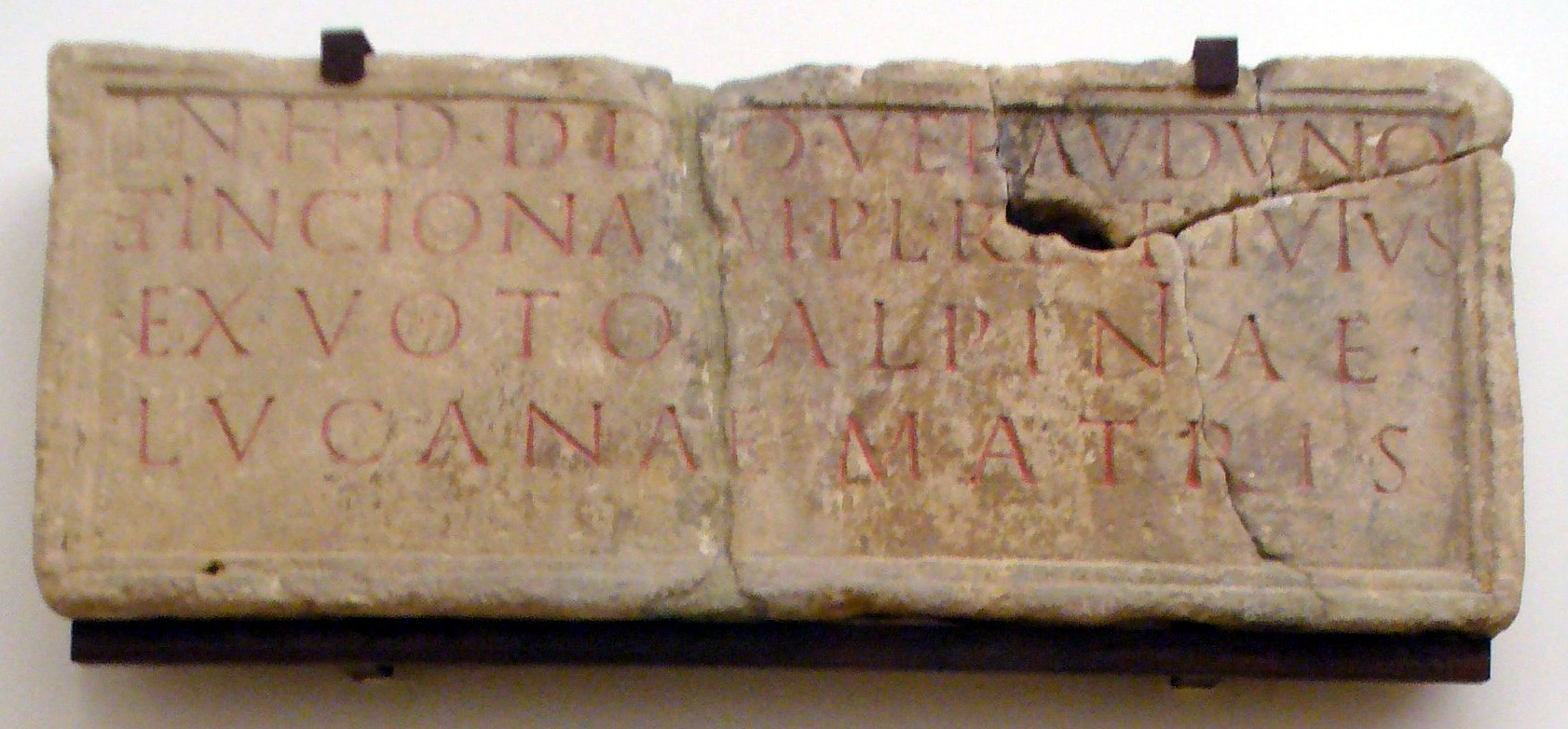
A votive inscription from the Widdebierg, Luxembourg.

On the large stone slab from Mensdorf on the Widdebierg, pictured at right, she is invoked along with the god Veraudunus and in honour of the imperial family in fulfilment of a vow made by Marcus Pl(autius?) Restitutus' mother Alpinia Lucana.

The second inscription, a small bronze votive plaque from Kaul in Luxembourg, reads:

[LE]NO MAR[TI]
VERAVDVN(O) ET
INCIONE MI
[L]ITIVS PRIS
CINVS EX VOT(O)

If the letters NO MAR can be restored as Leno Marti, then Inciona is here invoked alongside Lenus Mars Veraudunus.

== See also ==
- Dictionary of Celtic Myth and Legend. Miranda Green. Thames and Hudson Ltd. London. 1997
