= Gaius Julius Alpinus Classicianus =

1st century AD procurator of Roman Britain

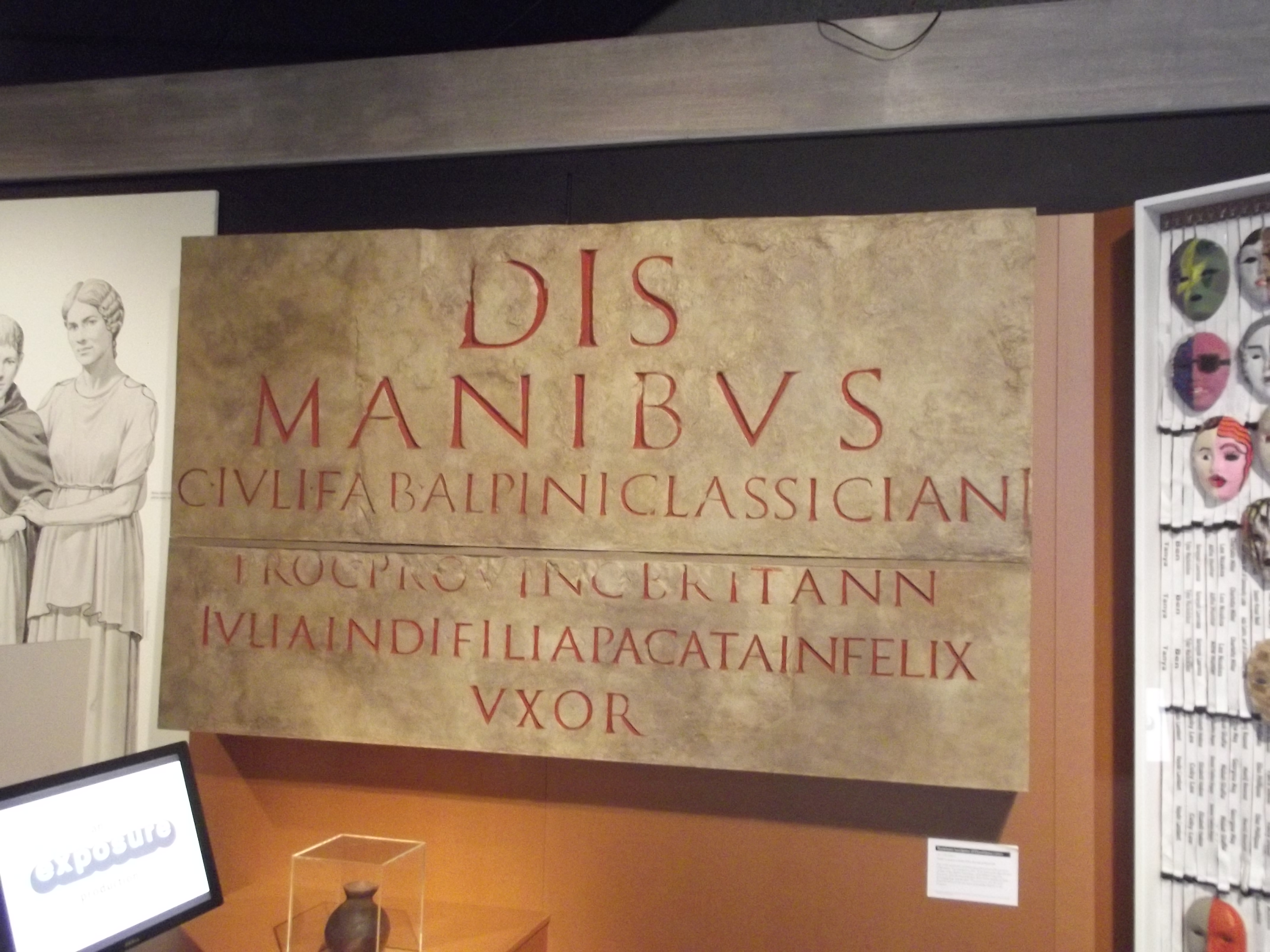
A replica of Classicianus's tombstone at the Museum of London

Gaius Julius Alpinus Classicianus was procurator of Roman Britain from 61 to his death in 65.

He was appointed after his predecessor, Catus Decianus, had fled to Gaul in the aftermath of the rebellion of Boudica. Classicianus expressed concern to the Emperor Nero that the punitive policies of the governor, Suetonius Paulinus, would lead to continued hostilities. Nero despatched his freedman, Polyclitus, to lead an inquiry. An excuse, that Suetonius had lost some ships, was found to relieve him of command and replace him with Publius Petronius Turpilianus.

Classicianus died in London in 65. London had been destroyed by Boudica only four years before, so Classicianus must have overseen considerable reconstruction. His funerary monument was erected by his wife Julia Pacata, daughter of Julius Indus, a nobleman of the Gaulish Treveri who became commander of the Ala Gallorum Indiana cavalry unit. The stone was re-used in the medieval wall of London, and, reconstructed, is now in the British Museum.

He may have been related to the Julius Alpinus who was executed after leading the Helvetii of Aventicum against Aulus Caecina Alienus, or the Julius Classicus who led a unit of Treviran auxiliary cavalry in Otho's army, both in 69.
