= Veraudunus =

Celtic god

Veraudunus is the name of a Gallo-Roman Celtic god known only from two votive inscriptions found in Luxembourg. One of these inscriptions suggests that ‘Veraudunus’ may have been an epithet of the important Treveran god Lenus Mars. In both inscriptions, Veraudunus is invoked along with Inciona.

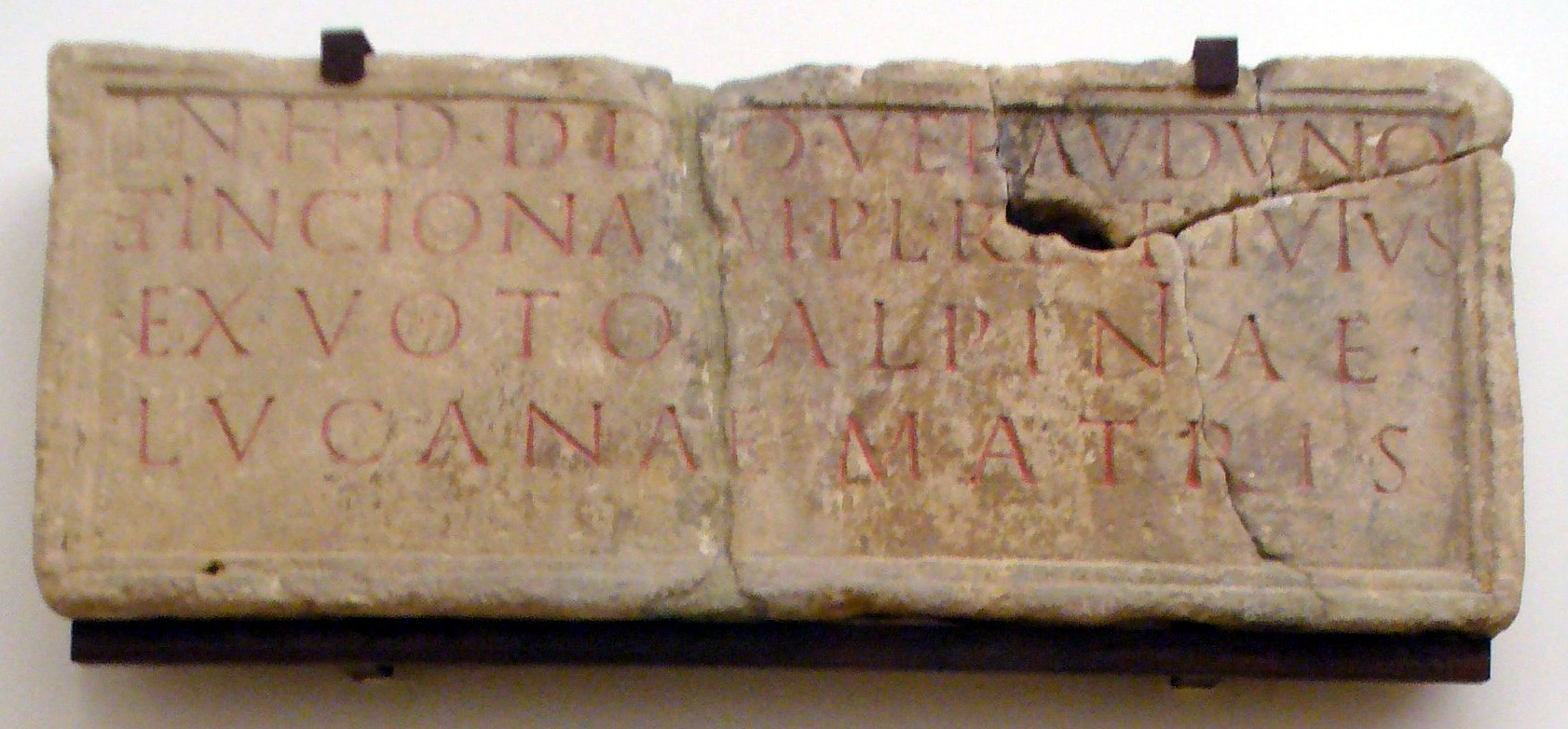
A votive inscription from the Widdebierg, Luxembourg.

On the large stone slab from Mensdorf on the Widdebierg, pictured at right, the god Veraudunus (DEO VERAVDVNO) and Inciona are invoked in honour of the imperial family in fulfilment of a vow made by Marcus Pl(autius?) Restitutus' mother Alpinia Lucana.

The second inscription is a small bronze votive plaque from Kaul in Luxembourg, which reads:

[LE]NO MAR[TI]
VERAVDVN(O) ET
INCION(A)E MI
[L]ITIVS PRIS
CINVS EX VOT(O)

If the letters NO MAR can be restored as Leno Marti, then ‘Veraudunus’ appears to be an epithet of Lenus Mars, the tribal protector of the Treveri who inhabited what is now Luxembourg.

The name of the Widdebierg itself has been said to derive from ‘Veraudunus’.

== See also ==
- Dictionary of Celtic Myth and Legend. Miranda Green. Thames and Hudson Ltd. London. 1997
