= Julia Pacata =

1st century AD Gaulish noblewoman

Julia Pacata Indiana was the daughter of Julius Indus, a 1st-century nobleman of the Treveri who helped put down a Gaulish rebellion in 21 and led an auxiliary cavalry unit in the Roman army, the Ala Gallorum Indiana. She married Gaius Julius Alpinus Classicianus, the procurator of Roman Britain from 61 to his death in 65. She buried him in London, and his reconstructed tombstone, which was re-used in the medieval wall of London, is now in the British Museum. There is a copy in the Museum of London Collection which was on display until the Museum closed in 2022, and there is a poor quality copy of the inscription near the site of excavation which is just to the East of Tower Hill Underground Station by the Roman City Wall.

Presuming Julia Pacata lived in London with her husband, she is, apart from Boudica and Cartimandua, the first securely dated and named women in Roman Britain.
