= Julius Sacrovir =

Leader of a revolt against the Roman Empire

Julius Sacrovir was a Gaulish nobleman of the Aedui tribe and a member of the gens Julia. Alongside Julius Florus, a leader of the Treveri, he led in Gaul in a revolt against the Romans. After being defeated in battle Sacrovir fled to Augustodunum and committed suicide there.

== Gallic Revolt ==
Sacrovir, Florus, and other Gauls rebelled against the Romans in 21 AD due to their prohibitions of Gaulish druidism, and their bankrupting of Gaulish nobles through large confiscations of wealth. Their plan was to use Florus to rouse the Belgae, while Sacrovir roused the rest of the Gauls. Florus began the war by raising a regiment of Treviri horsemen, which he would use to massacre Roman merchants. His army was met by Julius Indus at the Ardennes Forest; during this battle Florus was killed. At the beginning Sacrovir wished to feign an alliance with the Romans, which led to him fighting against the Gauls. Sacrovir would later raise an army of around fifty thousand men to take back the city of Augustodunum, which was the capital of his tribe. In response Roman general Acillius Aviola raised a Cohort of six hundred soldiers and went to subdue the Gauls. He was successful in several provinces. Another commander named Visellius Varo quelled an insurrection at Tours. Gaius Silius, who was an officer in the Legio I Germanica, was the general who defeated Sacrovir in battle. Afterwards, he fled to Augustodunum. Fearing that he would be delivered to the Romans, he withdrew to a villa near the city with his most loyal followers and committed suicide there. His followers also committed suicide with their swords after having set fire to the villa. Julius Sacrovir's defeat was commemorated by a triumphal arch.
