= P. alpinus =

P. alpinus may refer to:

- Phyllocladus alpinus, a conifer species found only in New Zealand
- Potamogeton alpinus, the alpine pondweed or red pondweed, an aquatic plant species native to much of the Northern Hemisphere

== See also ==
- Alpinus (disambiguation)
