= Iovantucarus =

Celtic god identified with Lenus Mars

Mars Iovantucarus was a Celtic god who was associated with the Treveran healer-god Lenus Mars at his sanctuary at Trier. The name reflects the deity's function as a protector of youth, and the temple was visited by pilgrims who often brought with them images of children, often depicting as holding pet birds as offerings to the god. At Tholey, also in Treveran territory, ‘Iovantucarus’ was also used as an epithet of Mercury.
