= Intarabus =

Gaulish god

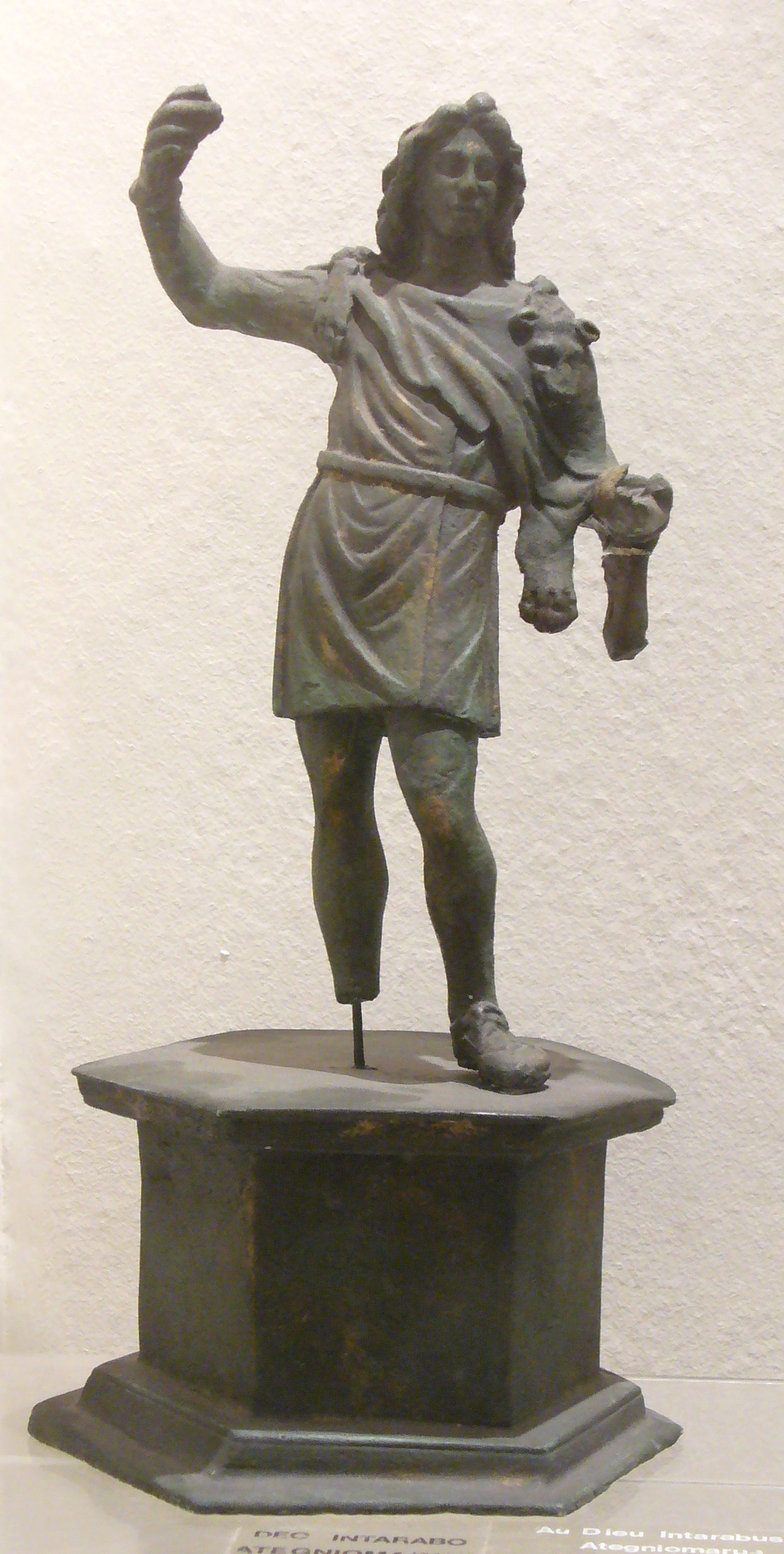
Bronze statuette of Intarabus from Foy-Noville, now at the Musée archéologique d'Arlon.

Intarabus was a Gallo-Roman god in the local pantheon of the Treveri and some neighbouring peoples. His name is known from nine inscriptions from a relatively compact area in what are now Belgium, Luxembourg, western Germany and eastern France. He may have been the tutelary deity of one of the three pagi (subdivisions) of the Treveri. In most cases, Intarabus is invoked alone – without any synthesis to a Roman deity, and without accompanying female deities. However, one inscription invokes him as Mars Intarabus, noting that a fanum and simulacrum of this god had been restored at Trier. Meanwhile, another inscription from Mackwiller in Alsace gives Intarabus the epithet Narius. An inscription at Ernzen in Germany has his name as [In]tarabus, while another from Foy-Noville (now within the town of Bastogne in Belgium), invokes Entarabus in conjunction with the Genius Ollodagus.

A bronze statuette from the Foy-Noville site, identified on the base as Deo Intarabo (in the dative case), depicts the god as a beardless, long-haired man in a tunic, draped with a wolf skin. His raised right hand would presumably have held a spear or some other implement, while his left hand, extended at waist length, is now missing.

The theatre at Echternach appears to have been dedicated to Intarabus, as was an aedicula at Ernzen. A silver ring engraved simply with the name Intarabo (again, in the dative case) was found at Dalheim.

According to Helmut Birkhan, the site at Mackwiller reveals a number of evolutions in the local cult. Starting in the 1st century CE, there was a sanctuary for Narius Intarabus related to worship at a local spring. In the 2nd century CE, a mithraeum was built there, and inscriptions testify to the common worship of Mithras and Narius Intarabus. In the second half of the 3rd century, the mithraeum was replaced with a traditional Gaulish-style temple, which now enclosed the sacred spring. From this it can be seen that the Mithraic cult was abandoned in favour of the older Celtic local deities.

The name ‘Intarabus’ has been characterized as “etymologically obscure”; Xavier Delamarre, however, takes the name to mean entar-abus "Entre-Rivières" (between rivers).
