= Lingones =

Gallic people

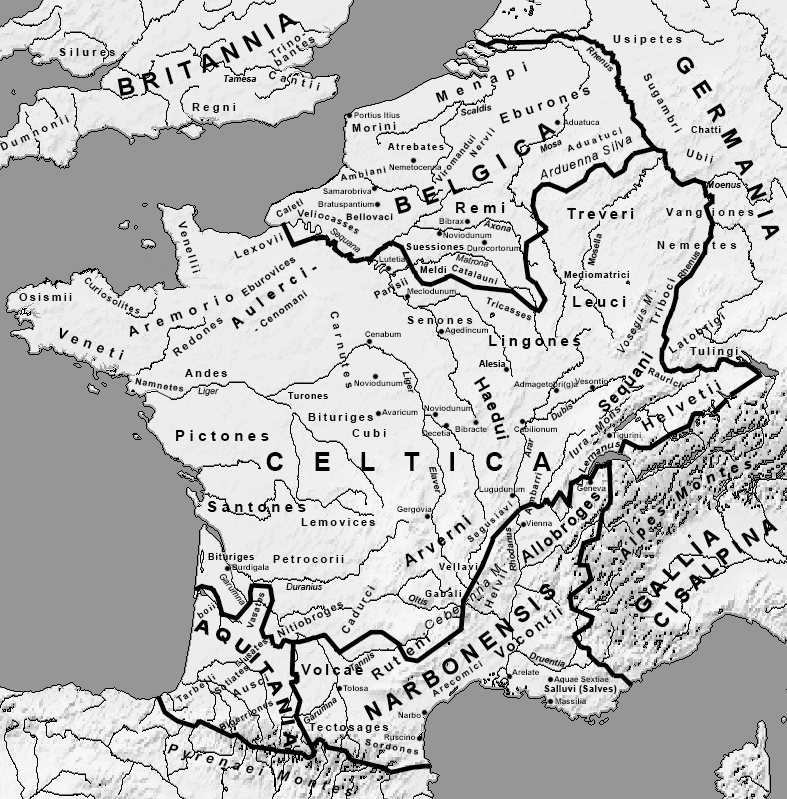
A map of Gaul showing the relative position of the Lingones tribe, near centre right.

The Lingones (Latin: Lingones; Ancient Greek: Λίγγωνες) were a Gallic people who first settled in the plain of the Po during the migrations into northern Italy at the beginning of the 4th century BC.

From the 1st c. BC they dwelt on the Langres plateau, around the upper courses of the Seine and the Marne]. Their chief town was Andemantunnum (modern Langres). During the Gallic Wars (58–50 BC), the Lingones remained loyal to Rome. Under the Roman Empire their community held the rank of a colony, but in AD 70 a part of the tribe, led by the nobleman Julius Sabinus, joined the Gallic revolt before being defeated. Their principal civic god was Mars Cicolluis, an interpretatio Romana of a local deity.

== Name ==
=== Attestations ===
They are mentioned as Líggōnes (Λίγγωνες) by Polybius (2nd century BC), Lingones by Caesar (mid-1st century BC), Pliny (1st century AD) and Tacitus (early 2nd century AD), Díngones (Δίγγονες) by Strabo (early 1st century AD), and as Lóngōnes (Λόγγωνες) by Ptolemy (2nd century AD).

The name of the Cisalpine group is given in the same forms by the ancient authors, and the two are not distinguished in the sources.

=== Etymology ===
The Gaulish ethnonym Lingones means 'the jumpers'. It derives from the stem ling- ('to jump'), itself from the Proto-Celtic verbal base *leng- ('to jump'; compare Old Irish lingid, 'he jumps'), extended by the suffix -on-es. The name has been read more precisely as 'good at jumping (on horseback)', or else as 'the dancers'.

The city of Langres, attested ca. 400 AD as civitas Lingonum, is named after the Gallic tribe.

== Geography ==
The territory of the Lingones lay on the northern flank of the sill of Burgundy, at the south-eastern edge of the Paris Basin. Its core was the Langres plateau, a watershed of the North Sea and Mediterranean basins from which several major rivers rise, among them the Seine, the Marne, the Aube and the Meuse. The civitas is reconstructed from the limits of the medieval diocese of Langres. It extended over four modern French departments: the south-east of the Aube in the north, the south of the Haute-Marne in the east, the eastern Côte-d'Or in the south, and the east of the Yonne in the west. Its exact borders are uncertain, and the reconstructions proposed by different scholars diverge.

The Lingones bordered the Senones and Tricasses to the north and north-west, the Leuci to the north, the Sequani to the east, from whom they were separated by the upper course of the Saône, and the Aedui to the south-west. Between the Lingones and the Aedui lay the Mandubii, a small people around Alesia who under the empire formed a pagus rather than a separate civitas. The people to whom this pagus belonged is disputed. Michel Reddé holds that the Mandubii were most probably attached to the Lingones by an adtributio, while Marie-Thérèse Raepsaet-Charlier, from the epigraphy of the cults, argues that the pagus belonged to the Aedui.

Administratively the Lingones belonged to Gallia Celtica, and after the Roman conquest they were attached to Gallia Belgica. Under Domitian they were transferred, together with the Helvetii and the Sequani, to the province of Germania Superior, a move connected with the securing of the road junction at Langres. A later transfer to Gallia Lugdunensis, supposed before AD 226, is doubted by Raepsaet-Charlier, for whom the affiliation to Germania Superior remains the most likely situation.

== History ==
=== Cisalpine Lingones ===
The Lingones of Italy are named among the Gallic peoples who settled the plain of the Po during the migrations into northern Italy, in a wave that the ancient tradition, followed by Livy, places at the beginning of the 4th century BC and links to the crossing of the Boii. Their exact location in Cispadane Gaul is uncertain. They are usually placed north of the Boii, in the area of the modern province of Ferrara.

=== Gallic Wars ===
At the time of the Roman conquest the Lingones were one of the more important peoples of central-eastern Gaul. They are mentioned several times by Julius Caesar in his account of the war, but the name of their capital is never given, and they appear to have kept largely apart from the events of the conquest. In 58 BC the Helvetii crossed their territory during the retreat that followed the defeat at Bibracte, and Caesar ordered the Lingones not to supply them with grain. In 52 BC the Lingones took no part in the assembly at Bibracte and do not seem to have joined the coalition led by Vercingetorix. In the following year they supplied, together with the Remi, a body of cavalry to the Roman army engaged against the Bellovaci, which confirms their standing in the party favourable to Rome.

=== Roman period ===
Under the empire the Lingones formed a civitas, described by Pliny as a federate people (foederata). They received the rank of colony from Otho, who granted Roman citizenship to all the Lingones, perhaps in an attempt to detach them from the party of Vitellius. The grant was afterwards annulled by Vespasian. It is generally held that the colonial title was then reduced by the Flavians to that of a Latin colony as a punishment, though Raepsaet-Charlier regards the supposed reduction as resting more on preconception than on argument.

The Lingones were deeply involved in the civil wars of AD 68–70. During the revolt of Vindex they sided, with the Treveri, against the rebels and behind Verginius Rufus, and Galba punished them for this hostility by cutting away part of their territory. Under Vitellius their position was reversed, and eight Batavian cohorts were quartered among them. When the Batavian Julius Civilis raised his revolt, the Lingon noble Julius Sabinus joined him alongside the Treveran leaders Julius Classicus and Julius Tutor, and the rebels proclaimed an imperium Galliarum, an expression that may be a later Flavian formulation rather than a real programme. Sabinus, who claimed descent from Julius Caesar and took the title of Caesar, led his Lingon militia against the Sequani, who had remained loyal, and was heavily defeated. A conference of the Gallic communities at Reims declined to join the revolt, which was broken by Quintus Petillius Cerialis at Trier in 70.

The suppression fell directly on the Lingones. The VIII Augusta legion, under its legate Sextus Julius Frontinus, campaigned against them, and Frontinus in his own Strategemata claims that 70,000 armed rebels surrendered, a figure to be treated with caution. A legionary fortress was established at Mirebeau-sur-Bèze, in the southern part of Lingon territory, at a road junction near the crossing of the Saône, and it remained in use until at least the mid-80s, before the legion was transferred to Argentorate. The Lingones were not otherwise punished, Frontinus recording the clemency of Vespasian. Sabinus himself went into hiding for nine years before he was discovered and executed. Apart from the Lingones, the federate peoples of the region did not raise troops on a national basis before this date, and the large-scale recruitment of Lingones into the auxiliary forces (the cohortes Lingonum) appears to be essentially later than the events of 68–70.

== Settlement and material culture ==
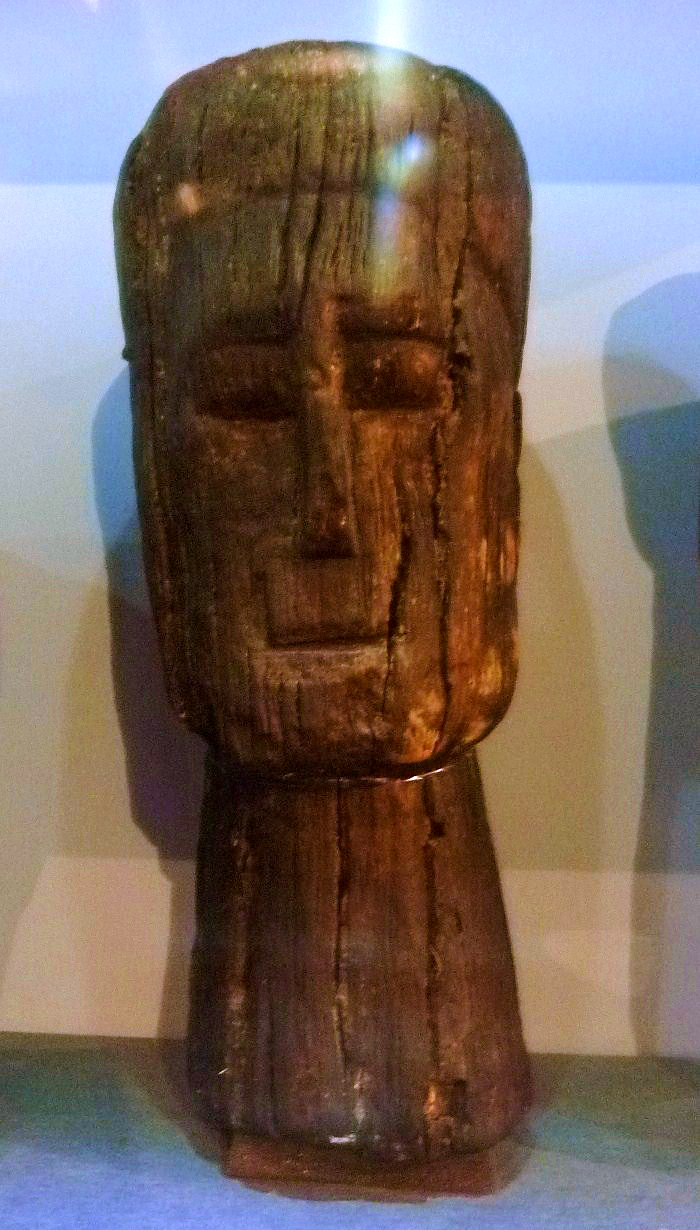
Wooden ex-voto from the sanctuary of the Seine headwaters, the attribution of which to the Lingones is debated (Musée archéologique de Dijon).

Their chief town was Andemantunnum (modern Langres). The name is first attested, abbreviated to AND, on milestones of AD 43. From the late 3rd century the town appears in the sources as Lingonae or civitas Lingonum, after the name of the people. The oppidum of the Lingones has been located under the modern town since the 19th century, chiefly on the strength of coin finds, including a hoard of more than three thousand Lingon potins discovered in 1880. The Gallic occupation, once thought confined to the northern spur, is now estimated to have covered about 50 hectares. The line of the Gallic rampart remains unknown.

The oppidum of Langres seems to have been created at the turn of the 2nd and 1st centuries BC, following the earlier lowland agglomeration of Champigny-lès-Langres a few kilometres to the north. As the hilltop site developed, the plain settlement declined, while its sanctuaries continued in use and grew in importance. Excavations that reached the natural subsoil have shown continuous occupation from the end of the La Tène period into Roman times.

The Roman town developed on the site of the Gallic settlement, and a major programme of levelling and building began under Augustus. Its most striking work was a massive retaining wall recognised over 140 metres built to hold a terrace against a slipping cliff. The town had no rampart under the Early Empire but was marked by monumental arches at the ends of its main streets. Two survive in record, the extant Porte Romaine and the Longe Porte demolished in the 19th century. The remains of a third have been recognised at the citadel. Their close similarity points to a single, concerted programme, and the study of their Corinthian capitals and cornices places them in the late Augustan period. An orthogonal street grid can be partly restored, though the regular scheme once proposed for it is not confirmed. There was probably no aqueduct; the town drew its water from the springs of the promontory, supplemented by wells and cisterns.

A large Augustan temple is documented by architectural fragments, among them the lower register of a Corinthian capital 109 centimetres across. A more modest temple of classical plan was excavated at the place Bel-Air. At the periphery of the town stood monumental tombs of the early urban elite, studied as a group, among them a variant of the aedicula-on-podium type that anticipates the later Rhenish pillars. About 4 kilometres to the south-east, at the modern Freudenberg works, a walled establishment with a temple and buildings around a courtyard has been interpreted as a road station, perhaps a mansio, in use from the early Augustan period.

Besides the capital, the civitas contained two pagi, the pagus Andomus with its seat at Dijon (Dibio) and the pagus around Alesia, together with a number of secondary agglomerations such as Vertault (Vertillum) and Mâlain, and road and river settlements. Dijon, at the junction of the north–south road with the route to Autun, was a major centre, and its collegia of boatmen, smiths and stonecutters point to an important economic role. About 5 kilometres north of Langres, spread over the communes of Champigny-lès-Langres, Bannes and Charmes, lay a large cult zone of about 90 hectares set at the edge of a La Tène agglomeration, the largest such complex known in Lingon territory and plausibly the principal sanctuary of the civitas. In coinage, the Lingones struck the potin types attested in quantity at Langres, together with silver quinarii and struck bronzes.

== Religion ==
The public cult of the civitas was organised at the Augustan foundation of the city, when the community composed its own pantheon and carried out the assimilations of local deities to Roman gods. The evidence, essentially epigraphic, covers 143 religious inscriptions, most of them of the 2nd and 3rd centuries, and it is unevenly distributed: the north and north-west of the territory, towards the Senones and Tricasses, are almost empty of religious inscriptions.

The chief god of the Lingones was Mars, in the form of Mars Cicolluis, an interpretatio Romana of a local deity. That this was the civic Mars is shown by a dedication at Xanten (Vetera), on the Rhine, set up under Nero by Lingon citizens established there, who honoured the god of their homeland. The god had no temple in the capital and may not have been worshipped there under his local epithet. A large sanctuary of Mars and Bellona stood immediately south of Langres, at the boundary of the communes of Bourg and Saints-Geosmes, and Mars Cicolluis was worshipped with the goddess Litavis at the sanctuary of Mâlain. The cult of Mars Cicolluis was used exclusively by Lingones and was proper to the civitas rather than to any wider Gaulish or Roman tradition.

The other deities of the Roman pantheon were honoured mainly through assimilation to local gods. Jupiter Optimus Maximus is attested in the capital, but the Capitoline Triad, obligatory in a colony, is barely represented. Apollo appears in several forms: as Vindonnus at the healing sanctuary of Essarois, with the Apollo Borvo worshipped together with Damona at the thermal site of Bourbonne, and as Moritasgus at Alesia. Mercury, god of roads and exchange, is well attested along the routes, under the epithet Moccus at Langres and paired with Rosmerta or with Maia. The Matres and Epona each received only a small number of dedications.

The plateau of Langres, rich in springs, gave rise to river-source cults. The sources of the Marne, at Balesmes immediately south of the town, were a sacred site of the goddess Matrona and lay within Lingon territory. At the Seine headwaters, a monumental sanctuary of the goddess Sequana produced a large body of anatomical ex-votos in wood, stone and bronze. Its attribution to the Lingones is disputed. It is included in the epigraphic corpus of the civitas, but William Van Andringa regards its Lingon character as unproven, and Raepsaet-Charlier assigns it, on the evidence of the dedicatory formulae, to the pagus of the Mandubii, which she attaches to the Aedui.

The imperial cult is little represented, and no explicit dedication has been found in the capital itself. A notice in Cassiodorus records that Drusus consecrated a templum Caesari among the Lingones in 9 BC, but its reliability is doubted, and it is generally emended so as to refer to the altar at Lyon. Votive practice was widespread, whereas the imported cults of Cybele, Mithras and Isis are almost absent, a sign that the military impact on the civitas was slight.

== Society ==
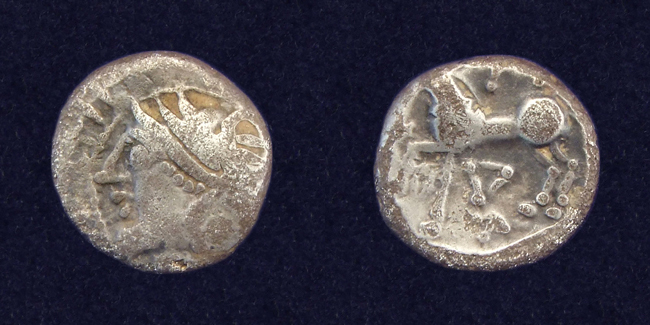
Silver quinarius used by the Lingones

The population known from the inscriptions is overwhelmingly of peregrine status, with a high proportion of Gaulish names. Among the identifiable dedicants of the religious inscriptions, peregrines make up about 43 per cent, well above the figure for the province of Germania Superior as a whole, and Celtic name-elements remain common, though Latin elements are more numerous. The local elite is thinly documented, while slaves and freedmen, including public slaves of the civitas, are comparatively well represented. One of the fullest documents for Lingon society is the so-called Testament of the Lingon, a detailed funerary foundation of a wealthy landowner, Sextus Julius Aquila, perhaps a client of the legate Sextus Julius Frontinus.
