= Revolt of Sacrovir =

21 failed Gallic anti-Roman revolt

Florus-Sacrovir Revolt
Date	21
Location	Roman Gaul
Result	Roman victory; suppression of participant tribes; suppression of Druidic practices

Belligerents
Aedui; Treveri; Turones; Andecavi; Sequani	Roman Empire

Commanders and leaders
Julius Sacrovir; Julius Florus	Gaius Silius

Strength
Under Florus: Treveri cavalrymen; Under Sacrovir: 40,000 Aedui and Sequani	2 legions

Casualties and losses
Unknown	Unknown

The Revolt of Sacrovir, also called the Florus-Sacrovir Revolt, was a Gallic uprising against Roman authorities led by Julius Sacrovir of the Aedui and Julius Florus of the Treveri in AD 21. Motivated by financial woes, the two chieftains refused to pay an imposed tribute and led an army of Gallic debtors. Gaius Silius, commander of forces along the Rhine, suppressed the rebellion with two legions about twelve miles outside of Augustodunum. After failing to elude pursuers, Florus committed suicide to prevent capture, and Sacrovir was later killed after becoming trapped in a house fire.

Tacitus provides the most extent commentary on the rebellion of any primary source. In many respects Tacitus follows convention in his descriptions of the rebellion, even using the exact phrasing as other historians of his time (as was the norm in official historiography among Roman writers). Tacitus avoided lumping them in as opportunists. His description of the death of Sacrovir on the battlefield uses a tone of respectability and he emphasizes the fact Florus would have been brought before the Senate as a Roman for treason had he not taken his own life, treatment not given to mere brigands.

== Background ==
Under Roman rule, Gauls were subjected to harsh debt collection policies and a per capita provincial tribute. A procurator, Julius Licinus, was particularly out of hand with his collection policies. Licinus counted two additional months for taxation purposes by insisting November and December meant ninth and tenth months respectively, thus totaling fourteen months in a fiscal year. Cassius Dio records Licinus was too much of an embarrassment for Augustus to address directly. He was dismissed by Augustus in 15 BC and retired to Rome.

Tacitus lists the reasons for the revolt as: indebtedness, the vices of the Roman lifestyle, a desire for liberty, and the recent death of Germanicus (d. AD 19; heir of Tiberius). Alain Ferdière includes religious causes like the increasing persecution of Druidry and a recent prohibition on human sacrifices under Tiberius. The new taxes put in place by Tiberius to fund the campaigns of Germanicus (AD 14 – 16) were kept in place after the cessation of hostilities in Germany. This combined with the recent death of the prince likely exacerbated rebellious attitudes.

== Rebellion ==
Both Florus and Sacrovir were soldiers of the Roman army. In addition to their own ranks each sought to spread discontent within the Gallic tribes. This saw some success, with first hostilities being taken by the Turones and Andecavi in support of their cause. Sacrovir attempted to play both sides, possibly to protect himself. He and other Gauls fought for the Romans, although he suspiciously went to battle without a helmet so he could be recognized by rebel forces and spared. He saw some success in getting Treveri cavalrymen to defect to his side, however Roman authorities sent his own tribesmen to pursue him. Florus eluded the Romans for some time before being defeated in battle and taking his own life to prevent capture.

Sacrovir had initial successes. He took the city of Augustodunum and made it into a base of operations for the cause, recruiting tribal youths, their families, and slaves who were being trained for gladiatorial combat. Volunteers from all over the Aedui flocked to him until he had some 40,000 people under his command. The Sequani pledged their support, but a force of 2 legions from the Upper Rhine under Silius mobilized and laid waste to their lands before advancing on Augustodonum itself. The Romans found the rebels gathered on a plain to confront them, with a mounted Sacrovir on the frontline. The rebels were beaten after fierce fighting. Sacrovir and his few remaining followers took shelter in a cottage whereupon they were surrounded, and the house set on fire. Sacrovir chose suicide with his followers over surrender or burning to death.

== Aftermath ==
Druidic support of the revolt resulted in Tiberius outlawing Druidic practices and teachings. Clandestine religious practices continued in scattered caves and forest groves, however.

In a trial of AD 24, Gaius Silius will be accused of having anti-Roman sympathies for Sacrovir during the revolt. These accusations are motivated by a family feud between Silius and the prosecutor, compounded by the political machinations of Sejanus. The trial results in Silius' suicide.

== Bibliography ==
- Ferdière, Alain (2005), Les Gaules: provinces des Gaules et Germanies, provinces alpines IIe siècle BC-Ve siècle AD (in French), ISBN 9782200263690
- Grunewald, Thomas (2004), Bandits in the Roman Empire, ISBN 9781134337583
- Hogain, Daithi O (2003), the Celts, ISBN 9780851159232
- Lavan, Myles (2016), "Writing Revolt in the Early Roman Empire", in Schoenaers, Dirk; Firnhaber-Baker, Justine (eds.), The Routledge History Handbook of Medieval Revolt, ISBN 9781134878871
- Rutledge, Stephen H. (2002), Imperial Inquisitions, ISBN 9781134560608
- Wightman, Edith Mary (1985), Gallia Belgica, ISBN 9780520052970
