= Catus Decianus =

1st century AD procurator of Roman Britain

Catus Decianus was the procurator of Roman Britain in AD 60 or 61. Tacitus blames his "rapacity" in part for provoking the rebellion of Boudica. Cassius Dio says he confiscated sums of money which had been given by the emperor Claudius to leading Britons, declaring them to be loans to be repaid with interest.

When Boudica's army attacked Camulodunum (Colchester), the inhabitants sent to the procurator for help, but he sent only two hundred men. The city fell, and Decianus fled to Gaul, to be replaced by Gaius Julius Alpinus Classicianus. The fact that Decianus had to send men to Colchester implies that he himself was not resident there, prompting modern historians such as Sheppard Frere to place him in London during this period.
