= Ala Gallorum Indiana =

The Ala Gallorum Indiana ("Indus's Wing of Gauls") was a Gaulish auxiliary cavalry unit in the Roman army, named after its first commander, Julius Indus, a nobleman of the Treveri who helped put down a rebellion of the Treveri and Aedui in 21.

The Ala Indiana is thought to have participated in the Roman conquest of Britain, and by the mid-to-late 1st century was posted at Corinum (Cirencester). In 98 it is recorded in Germania Inferior, and in 134 in Germania Superior. The only mention of this ala in Britain is the tombstone of an eques from Cirencester with a style dating around 70.

== Sources ==
- Ala Gallorum Indiana at Roman-Britain.org
