= Alpinus =

Alpinus, a Latin adjective meaning pertaining to the Alps, may refer to:

- Alpinus, founder of the abbeys St. Memmius in the fifth century, in the Roman Catholic Diocese of Châlons, France
- Alpinus Montanus (fl. 1st century), a member of the Belgae and the commander of a cohort in the army of the Roman emperor Vitellius
- Homo alpinus, the Alpine race, a historical race concept defined by some late 19th-century and early 20th-century anthropologists as one of the three sub-races of the Caucasian race
- Prospero Alpini, also as published as Prosper Alpinus (1553–1617), a Venetian physician and botanist

== See also ==
- Alpina
- Alpinum
