= Widdebierg =

Hill in Luxembourg

Coordinates: 49°39′43.20″N 6°18′54″E

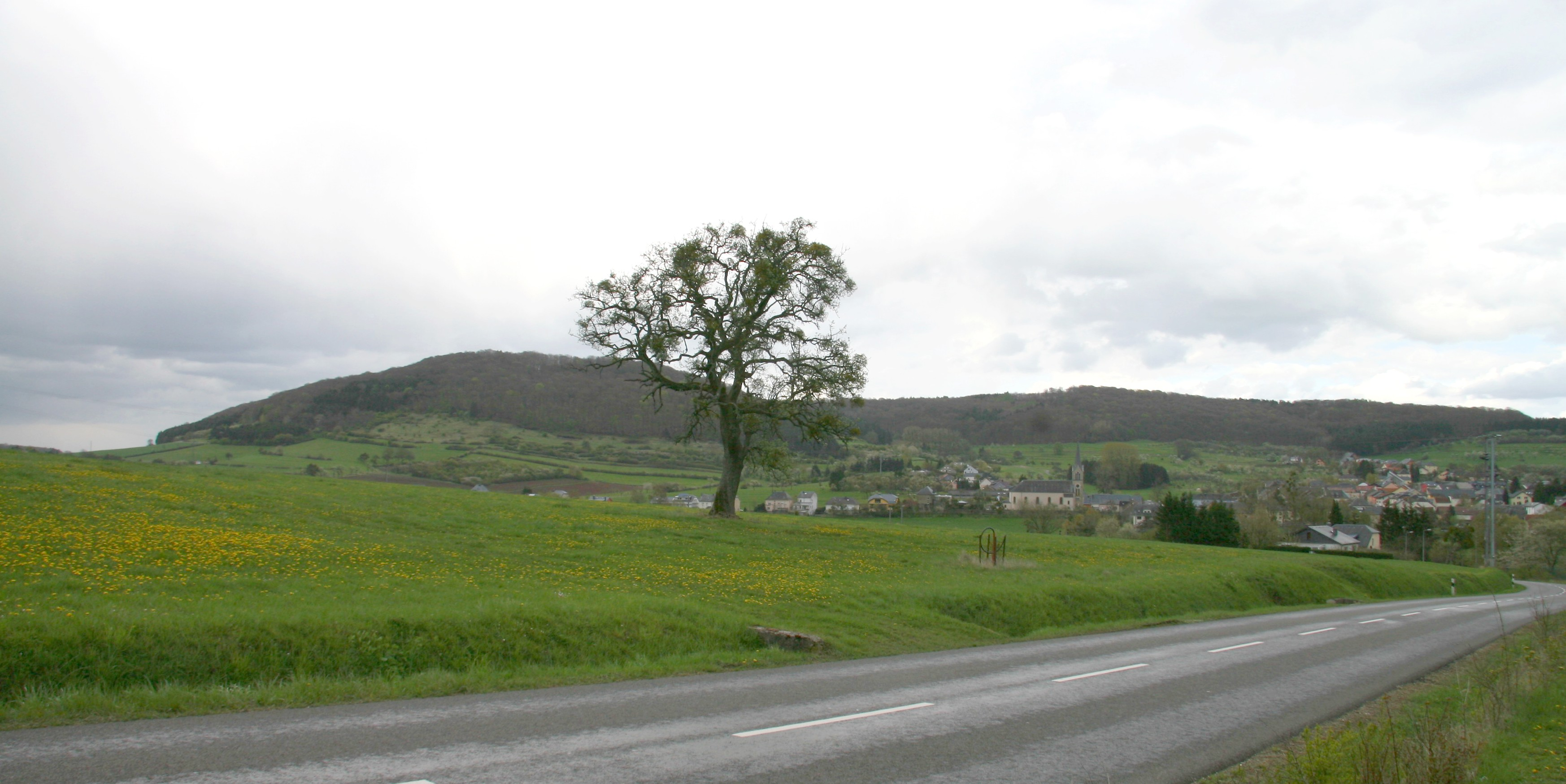
The Widdebierg in Menster

Widdebierg is a hill in the commune of Betzdorf, in eastern Luxembourg. At 386 metres (1,266 ft), it is one of the highest points in the canton of Grevenmacher. It is in the centre of a nature reserve (named Widdebierg after the hill), which lies between the towns of Flaxweiler, Mensdorf, and Roodt-sur-Syre.
