= Alpinius Montanus =

Alpinius Montanus (fl. 1st century CE) was one of the Treviri, a tribe of the Belgae, the indigenous peoples living in northern Gaul. He was the commander of a cohort in the army of the Roman emperor Vitellius, and was sent into Germany after the Battle of Bedriacum in the year 69. Tacitus mentions that Montanus and his men accepted the Vitellians' defeat by the Flavians and felt little attachment to either side. Together with his brother, Decimus Alpinius, he joined the revolt of Gaius Julius Civilis against Roman rule in the next year. He was one of those who crossed the Rhine to try to rally support for the rebellion among the peoples of Germania Libera.
