= Étienne-Barthélémy Garnier =

French painter (1759-1849)

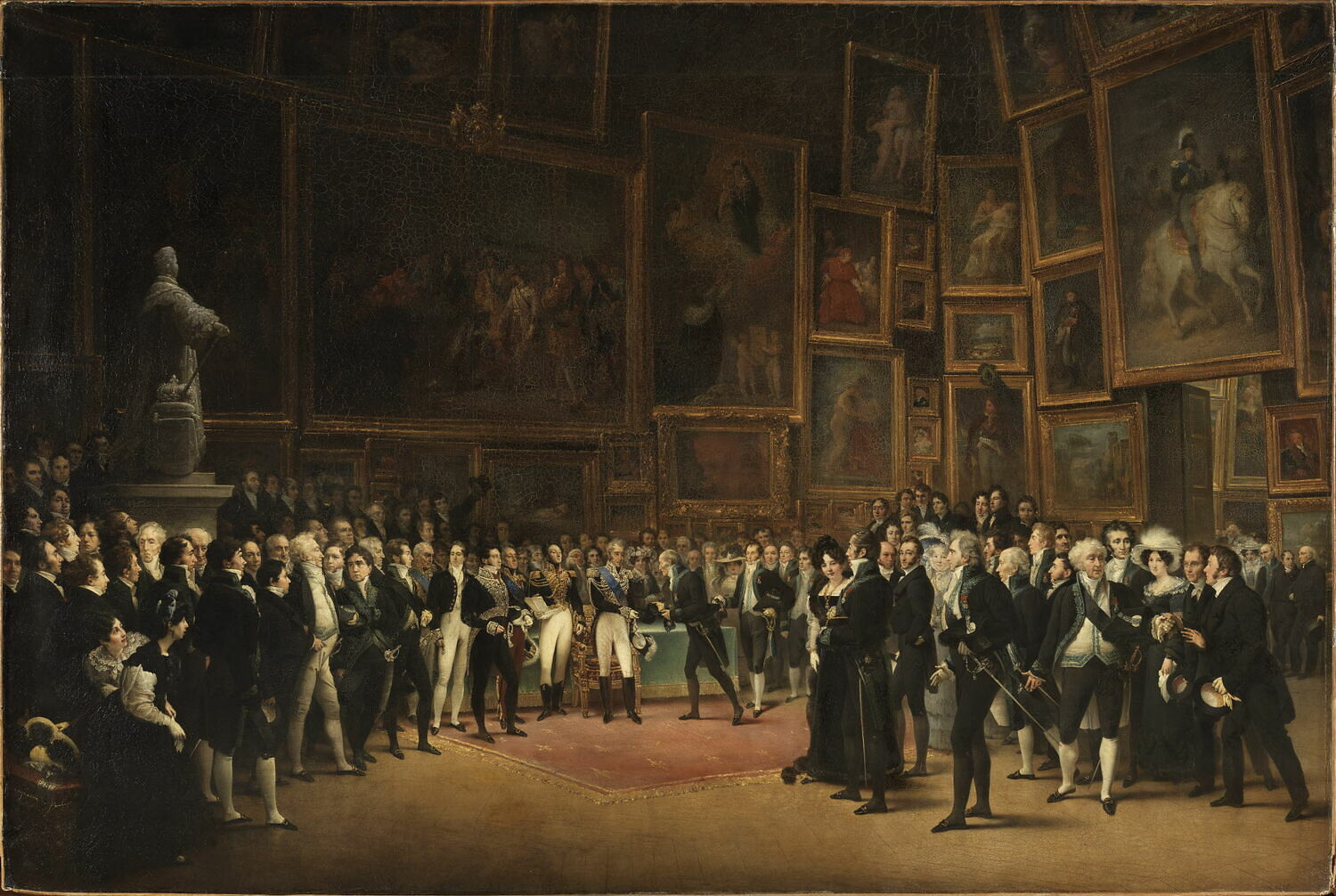
- Born: 24 August 1759; Paris
- Died: 16 November 1849 (aged 90); Paris
- Resting place: Montparnasse Cemetery
- Occupation: Painter
- Awards: Prix de Rome (1788); Chevalier of the Legion of Honour (1828)

Signature
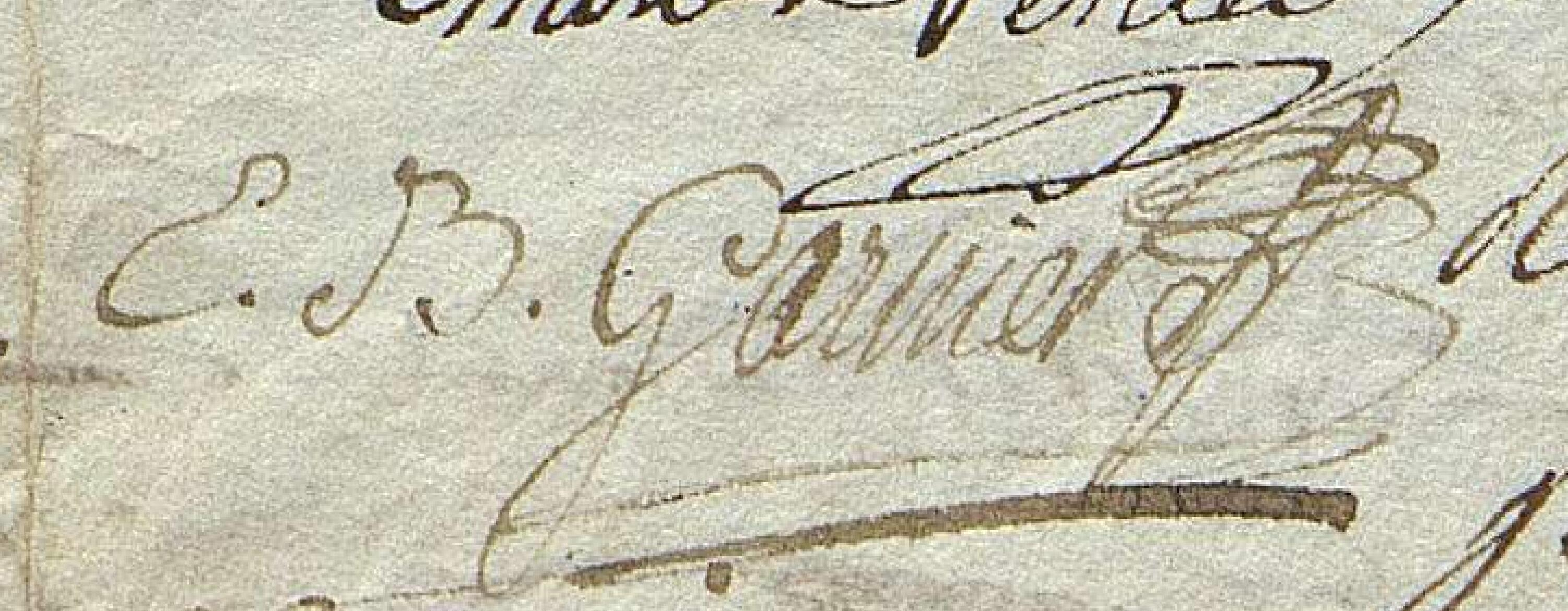

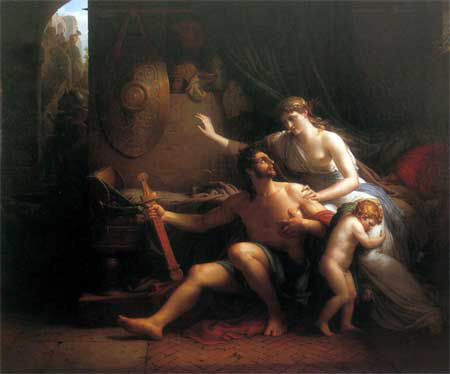
Garnier's painting Éponine et Sabinus (1810)

Étienne-Barthélémy Garnier. (24 August 1759 – 16 November 1849) was a French painter of historical subjects.

Grandson of François Garnier, cabinet-maker, son of Pierre Garnier, cabinet-maker, born in Paris, he studied art under Joseph-Marie Vien. He received second prize in the Prix de Rome of 1787 and first in 1788 with a painting on the subject The Death of Tatius, beating Louis Girodet. He lived in Rome until 1793.

He was elected member of the Academy of Fine Arts in 1816. He exhibited a large number of history paintings on classical and religious themes in the neo-classical manner. His painting Éponine et Sabinus, 1810, was exhibited at the Salon of 1810 and again at the Salon of 1814, when it was acquired by Louis XVIII. In 1824 he delivered the eulogy at the funeral of Girodet.
