= Leuci =

Belgic tribe

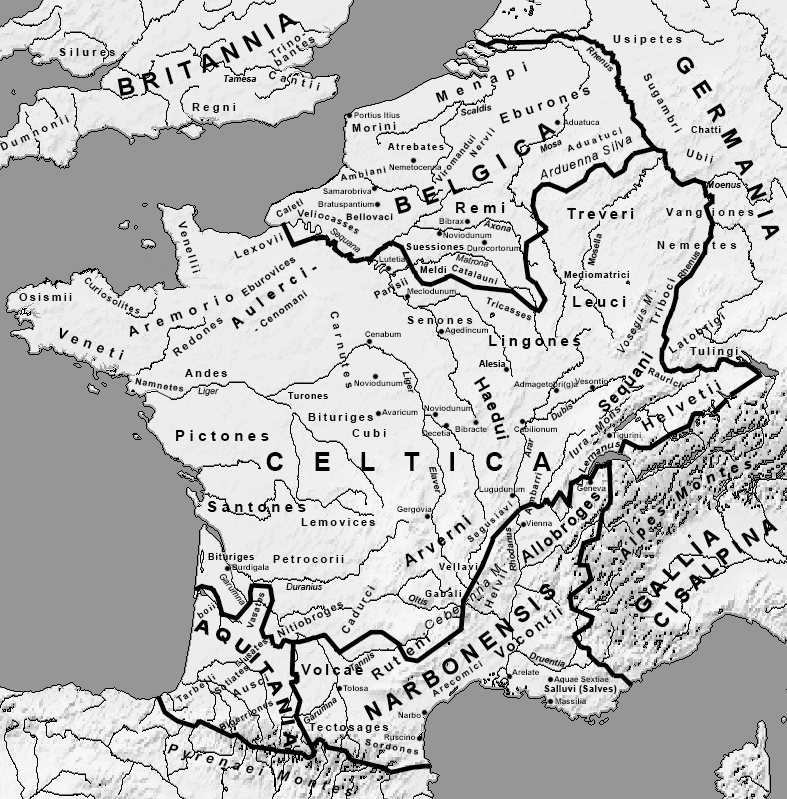
Map of Gaul with tribes, 1st century BC; the Leuci are circled.

The Leucī (Gaulish: Leucoi, 'the bright, lightning ones') were a Belgic tribe dwelling in the southern part of the modern Lorraine region during the Iron Age and the Roman period.

== Name ==
They are mentioned as Leucos (acc.) by Caesar (mid-1st c. BC), Leūkoi (Λευ̃κοι) by Strabo (early 1st c. AD), Leuci by Pliny (1st c. AD), and as Leukoì (Λευκοὶ) by Ptolemy (2nd c. AD).

The ethnonym Leucī is a latinized form of Gaulish Leucoi (sing. Leucos), which literally means 'the bright ones, the lightning ones'. It stems from Proto-Celtic *lowkos ('light, bright'; cf. Mid. Irish luach 'glowing white', Middle Welsh llug 'eyesight, perception'), itself from Proto-Indo-European *leukós ('bright, shining'; cf. Lat. lūx 'light', Grk leukós 'white', Toch. lyūke 'light').

== Geography ==
=== Territory ===
The territory of the Leuci extended in the east and the southeast up to the Vosges mountains, between the Marne and Moselle rivers. They were located north-west of the Sequani, and southwest of the Mediomatrici.

=== Settlements ===
During the Roman era, their capital was Tullum (modern Toul). Ptolemy (2nd c. AD), who normally gives one capital for each civitas, also lists Nasium (present-day Naix-aux-Forges) as a capital of the Leuci.

Hillforts held by the Leuci included a large oppidum at Boviolles (Ornain valley), west of their territory, and some smaller ones located in the Vosges. The Roman-era successor of Boviolles was more imposing than the central city Tullum, since the Ornain river served as an important trade route between Champagne and the plateau of Langres, on the territory of the Lingones. Another possible oppidum was located at Geneviève (Essey).

== Religion ==
During the Roman era, the Leuci worshipped Apollo (at Graux and Malaincourt) or Apollo Grannus (at Tullum, Nasium, and Grand) around a spring and healing cult.

== History ==
They are mentioned by Julius Caesar as a people supplying wheat to the Roman army in 58 BC, along with the Lingones and Sequani.

== See also ==
- Celtic camp at Bure (near Saint-Dié-des-Vosges)
