= Julius Indus =

1st century AD Gaulish noble

Julius Indus was a Treveri nobleman of the 1st century CE. In 21 CE he helped the Romans put down a rebellion of the Treveri and Aedui. Indus had a personal vendetta with one of the leaders in the revolt, Julius Florus. Culminating in a confrontation between the two in the Ardennes forest. During this fight, Indus killed Florus. His regiment may have been involved in the Roman invasion of Britain, and was certainly posted at Corinum (Cirencester) in the mid-to-late 1st century. His daughter, Julia Pacata, married the procurator of Roman Britain, Gaius Julius Alpinus Classicianus, and buried him in London in 65 CE.
