= Mensdorf =

Coordinates: 49°39′N 6°18′E

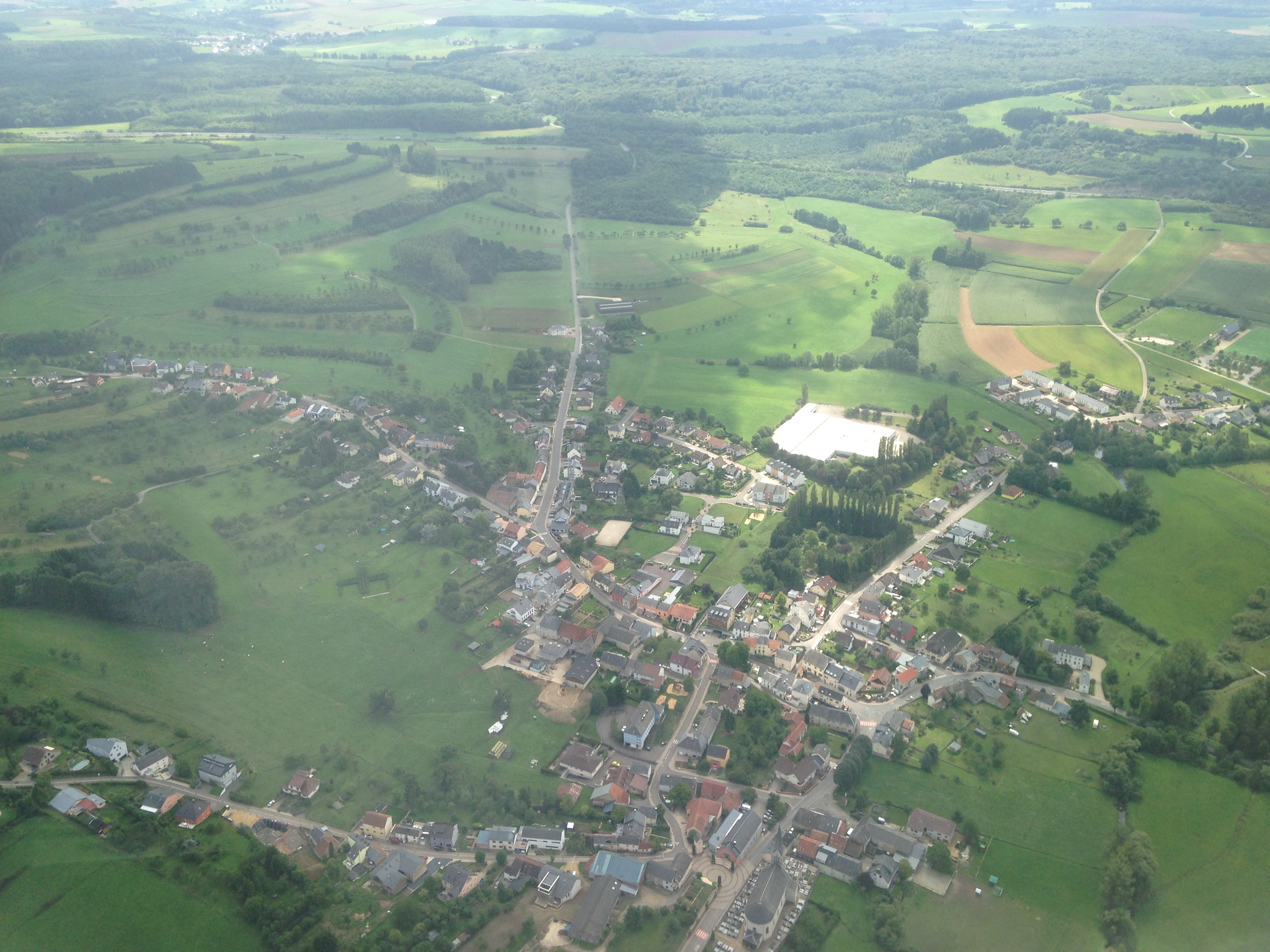
Aerial view of the village of Mensdorf in Luxembourg

Mensdorf (German pronunciation: [ˈmɛnsdɔʁf]; Luxembourgish: Menster) is a small town in the commune of Betzdorf, in eastern Luxembourg. As of September 2026, the town has a population of 1,041.

== Local associations ==
Mensdorf is home to a fanfare band, Fanfare de Mensdorf, which was founded on 1952. It is member of the Union Grand-Duc Adolphe U.G.D.A.

The band is formed by players of wind instruments and percussion instruments.
