= Binchy =

Binchy is a surname. Notable people named Binchy are:

- D. A. Binchy (1899–1989), scholar of linguistics and early Irish law, ambassador
- Maeve Binchy (1940–2012), novelist and playwright, one of Ireland's most celebrated writers
- William Binchy, law professor at Trinity College Dublin
