= Chestnut Street (book) =

2014 book by Maeve Binchy

- First UK edition
- Author: Maeve Binchy
- Language: English
- Genre: Short story collection
- Publisher: Orion (UK); Knopf (US)
- Publication date: April 24, 2014
- Publication place: United Kingdom
- Media type: Print (hardback & paperback)
- Pages: 400
- Preceded by: A Week in Winter (2012)
- Followed by: A Few of the Girls (2015)

Chestnut Street is a 2014 short story collection by the Irish author Maeve Binchy. It was published posthumously by her husband, Gordon Snell. It contains 36 short stories, the majority never before published, which Binchy had written over a period of decades. Each story centers around a different resident or family living on or connected to the fictional Chestnut Street in Dublin.

== Overview ==
The setting for the stories is the fictional Chestnut Street in Dublin, which Binchy describes as a U-shaped road with a "big bit of grass in the middle beside some chestnut trees" and "thirty small houses in a semicircle". Each story in the collection focuses on a different resident or family living on the street or connected to it in some way. Some characters appear in more than one story, but usually as a "passing mention" in the latter tales. The collection offers a panoply of character studies, exploring relationships between parents and children, spouses, lovers, and friends. Many of the situations Binchy creates "focus on people dealing with tough issues, with plenty of ambiguity and no tidy endings in sight"; others are drawn with humor and wit. O. Henry-style plot twists and surprise endings are often employed to bring tales to a satisfying conclusion.

== Characters and themes ==
The characters are quintessentially Irish and grapple with issues common to Irish society. Many of the main characters are women, and many of the men are "deadbeats" or unfaithful spouses and lovers. The protagonists span all ages, from children to teens to adults, and also all social classes.

Among the themes explored in the stories are "love, romance, marriage, divorce, greed, regret, miscommunication, come-uppance, change, connection, understanding". "Community" is also a common theme in the tales.

== Publishing history ==
Chestnut Street was the second Binchy title to be published after her death in July 2012; the first was the novel A Week in Winter, published at the end of 2012. The appearance of this Binchy title came as a surprise to her legions of fans, as they had had no knowledge of its existence. According to Binchy's husband Gordon Snell, who approved the publication and wrote the preface, Binchy had penned the stories over a period of decades with the intention of one day compiling them into a book. She had jotted down the stories in-between her major writing projects, and filed them away in a drawer. A couple of the tales had been printed in magazines, but most of the 36 stories selected for inclusion in this edition were being published for the first time.

Binchy's English-language publishers released the book simultaneously worldwide on April 24, 2014. The collection was marketed as a novel, as it mirrors Binchy's use of the interlocking-story format seen in her longer novels, such as Quentins. However, Snell had announced that A Week in Winter would be Binchy's last novel, saying: "It was the last novel – there will be no more", leading The Independent to rename this Binchy's "last book". (Note: In fact, a second short story collection by Binchy, titled A Few of the Girls, was published in 2015.)

== Critical reception ==
The Sunday Express gave the work 4 out of 5 stars, calling it "vintage Maeve Binchy ... with the wisdom and warmth that was a hallmark of her fiction". NPR praised the universality of the stories, adding: "Chestnut Street has everything that makes Binchy special, in small delicious bites; her ability to capture human nature, describe individual life arcs, and breathe life into characters ... Binchy's storytelling is so astute that we regard unlikable characters with understanding, if not sympathy". USA Today also commended the writing style, stating: "Binchy's prose is lyrical, carrying the reader along like a lullaby".

The Boston Globe noted the uneven nature of the stories, some "more fully realized than others, while some remain closer to fragments, vignettes, or even character sketches". Though composed over a period of decades, the stories also give no indication of the era in Irish history in which they were written. The Irish Times lamented the absence of Binchy's guiding hand to polish and prepare these stories for publication, stating: "As is perhaps inevitable in a posthumous collection, a few of the stories don't feel finished or polished; some just feel like extracts from potentially longer stories". As a rule, the earlier stories are better developed.
