= Heart and Soul (Binchy novel) =

2008 novel by Maeve Binchy

- First edition
- Author: Maeve Binchy
- Language: English
- Genre: Novel
- Publisher: Orion Books
- Publication date: 2008
- Publication place: (Republic of Ireland) Ireland
- Media type: Print (Hardback & Paperback)
- ISBN: 1-55278-728-1

Heart and Soul is a 2008 novel by the Irish author Maeve Binchy. The plot centers around what Binchy terms "a heart failure clinic" in Dublin and the people involved with it. Several characters from Binchy's previous novels, including Evening Class, Scarlet Feather, Quentins, and Whitethorn Woods, make appearances.

== Background ==
Binchy, who "suffered a health crisis related to a heart condition" in 2002, was inspired to write Heart and Soul by her own experiences and observations in the hospital.
