= Light a Penny Candle =

1982 novel by Maeve Binchy

- First edition
- Author: Maeve Binchy
- Language: English
- Genre: Novel
- Publisher: Century
- Publication date: 1982
- Publication place: (Republic of Ireland) Ireland
- Media type: Print (hardcover, paperback)
- Pages: 592 pp
- ISBN: 0-091-77989-8

Light a Penny Candle is a 1982 novel by the Irish author Maeve Binchy. Her debut novel, it follows the friendship between an English girl and an Irish girl over the course of three decades, beginning with the English girl's stay in Ireland during the Blitz. It is one of Binchy's best-known novels.

== Title ==
According to the Irish Examiner, the title comes from a lyric in the Arthur Colahan song "Galway Bay", which was popularized by American singer Bing Crosby in a 1947 recording. The song speaks of Ireland from the point of view of an emigrant who wishes he could go back to his native country. Alternately, the title may refer to a Catholic devotional practice.

== Plot summary ==
London was a dangerous place to live during World War II, and many children were evacuated to Ireland or the United States. Elizabeth White, an only child, is sent to live with her mother's childhood friend and her large and bustling family, the O'Connors, in Ireland. Although the mothers were childhood friends, their relationship has become one-sided with Elizabeth's mother, Violet, rarely corresponding and Aisling's mother, Eileen, remembering their closeness with detailed letters. Violet believes even though Ireland is not as refined as London, it is a safe place for her daughter.

Elizabeth quickly becomes fast friends with Aisling, who is also ten years old. The novel follows these two girls as they grow into teenagers and young women. Aisling is outgoing and bold, while Elizabeth is quiet with all the manners of a well-bred child. Elizabeth is shown a caring, loving family and begins to feel part of a real family, as opposed to the cold environment of her parents' house. After the war ends and Elizabeth returns to London, their friendship continues for decades. They remain in close contact through letters, supporting each other through their marriages. Their lives remain intertwined, each facing her own relationships, successes, and failures.

== Themes ==
Childhood – with its attendant growing pains and interactions at school and with members of the clergy – figures prominently in the novel. Kenny notes that Binchy was comfortable using young girls as main characters in her early novels as she had "observed children closely" while working as a teacher, and had become aware "how well a child can 'carry' a narrative". Children as major characters receded from Binchy's storytelling beginning with Tara Road in 1998.

Friendship is another theme that would play a prominent role in Binchy's oeuvre. In this novel, Binchy charts the course of a friendship from ages 10 to 30, "from idyllic childhood to turbulent adulthood", with each girl offering support to the other through letters and visits.

Religion plays an important role in the novel, as Binchy contrasts the Catholic schooling of Aisling's family in Ireland with the Protestant belief system of Elizabeth's family in London. Catholicism is depicted as "largely a religion of warmth and generosity", according to Kenny, who adds wryly, "The character of Father Riordan even conveys his disappointment that after living with a Catholic family and being educated in a convent for five years, Elizabeth did not decide to convert to Catholicism".

Other themes include sex, domestic abuse, alcoholism, mental health and depression, and abortion.

== Development ==
Binchy began writing short stories in the 1970s. Her first two collections, Victoria Line and Central Line, were moderate successes, selling 5,000 and 4,000 copies respectively. She wrote Light a Penny Candle, her first novel, at the urging of her agent, who recommended that she choose as a topic that was familiar to her. According to Binchy, this was "the differences between the Irish and the English", as she was then living in London and working as a journalist for The Irish Times. She worked on the novel in "5000-word bursts" over a series of 40 weekends in 1981, producing a 240,000-word manuscript.

Binchy's agent typed the manuscript herself and sold it to Rosemary Cheetham, the fiction editor at MacDonalds Publishers, for £5,000. After Cheetham moved to the Century publishing company, Binchy paid back the MacDonalds advance and also moved to Century. Light a Penny Candle was Century's first title.

Though the editor asked her to add some explicit sex scenes to the novel, Binchy refused, "not from reasons of prudishness, but because, she said, she liked to write from experience or observation, and quite frankly, her sexual experience wasn't very exotic, and she felt sure she'd be bound to get the logistics wrong if she tried to make it all up". After the novel became a best-seller without explicit sex scenes, any suggestion to "hot up" the material in future books was a non-starter. Binchy's discreet references to sexual activity in this and later novels were said to be appreciated by her American readers. She also refrained from printing blasphemy. Binchy once explained that the outburst "Jesus, Mary and Joseph!" was not a swear term but "a common Irish expression and not intended disrespectfully".

== Publishing history ==
Binchy received an initial advance of £5,000 for the novel. Light a Penny Candle set a British record for a first novel with a prepublication advance of £52,000 from Coronet. It was published in England in September 1982 and the following year was scheduled to appear in French, Danish, and Finnish translations. In the United States, the novel was published in hardcover by Viking Press in 1982 and in paperback by Dell Publishing in 1989. Viking paid Binchy $200,000. It was chosen as a main selection by the Literary Guild. This led to another $50,000. The French publisher paid Binchy 50,000 francs for this privilege.

== Reception ==
Light a Penny Candle is one of Binchy's best-known novels. In a contemporary review, Dennis Drabelle of The Washington Post wrote that although it is Binchy's first novel, "its narrative brio seems the work of a veteran". George Turner of The Age observed that the female characters were "strongly drawn" while the male characters were "moral weaklings all, with scarcely a redeeming feature, no doubt readily recognizable in a woman's world". Sherryl Connelly of the Akron Beacon Journal enthused, "Maeve Binchy has written a first novel that could be mistaken for life. The ordinariness of the book's characters, the accuracy of the telling and the honesty of its outcome pay homage to reality by making it readable. Eminently readable". Describing the novel as 542 pages of "good characterization, flowing dialogue and a realistic plot", a Santa Cruz Sentinel review augured that "This first effort ought to establish [Binchy's] credibility as a writer of extraordinary insight and craft".

== Adaptations ==
The novel was adapted into a 2019 stage play directed by Peter Sheridan, which was performed at the Gaiety Theatre, Dublin, and Everyman Theatre in County Cork in Spring 2019.
