= The Glass Lake =

1994 novel by Maeve Binchy

- First edition
- Author: Maeve Binchy
- Language: English
- Genre: Romance novel
- Publisher: Orion Publishing
- Publication date: 2 September 1994
- Publication place: (Republic of Ireland) Ireland
- Media type: Print (hardback & paperback)
- Pages: 608 pp (first edition, hardback)
- ISBN: 1-85797-950-8 (first edition, hardback)

The Glass Lake is a 1994 novel by the Irish author Maeve Binchy. The action takes place in a rural Irish village as well as in London in the 1950s. It is notable as the last of Binchy's novels to be set in the 1950s. Binchy explores the roles of women in Irish society and inconstant lovers, and uses an operatic plot to hold the reader's attention.

== Plot ==
Helen McMahon disappears when her daughter Kit is 12 years old, and it is suspected that she drowned in the local lake. Kit finds a letter from her mother and burns it before reading it, fearing that a suicide note will prevent her from meriting a church burial. In fact, Helen has left her kindly but unexciting husband Martin and two children to run off to London to be with her dashing lover, and left the note to let them know that she would like to keep in touch with her children as they grow up.

Kit struggles to grow up without her mother and with the stigma of her mother's death. While Kit has many friends and mentors to help her grow, she forges a close relationship via a pen pal relationship with a woman named Lena Gray, who claims to have been a close friend of Helen. The story then traces the fallout of Kit finding out that her mother is not dead and is in fact Lena Gray. Other characters in the novel who play significant roles in Kit's life are her on-again, off-again friend Clio Kelly, the doting Philip O'Brien who has wanted to marry her all his life, Stevie Sullivan who owns the car garage across the street, and Sister Madeleine, a reclusive older woman who shares everyone's confidences.

== Themes ==
Like Tara Road, in which Binchy introduces an American character to an Irish town, The Glass Lake offers readers a look at the lives of women in another country – namely, England, to which Lena escapes with her lover. This plot device plays up the "Irishness" of the other protagonists and reinforces the self-identity of Binchy's Irish women readers.

Priests, brothers, and nuns are all featured in this and other early works by Binchy. In The Glass Lake, Binchy creates the character of Sister Madeleine, an all-knowing, tolerant, and giving woman who lives as a hermit on the edge of town. Binchy's husband, Gordon Snell, asked her to "tone down" Sister Madeleine's goodness after reading the first draft and finding the character "too soppy" and "too sentimental". However, "she remains the most wholly admirable person in the story".

== Reception ==
The Detroit Free Press notes that The Glass Lake differs from previous Binchy titles in being plot-driven rather than character-based. This review, which gave the book 2½ out of 4 stars, called the overlay of "mystery and tragedy swirling around the main character" unsettling, and accused Binchy of "in some cases neglect[ing] the credibility of her characters" in favor of the plot. The Star Tribune, in contrast, felt the major characters were credible but reflected a strong gender bias:

Binchy's women, once again, tend to be the "good guys." They are capable and loving, ambitious and intelligent. They are disappointed in their relationships with men. Male characters, the "bad guys", lack motivation, discipline and commitment. They are, more often than not, the source of the women's problems.

This review suggests that the gender bias could be traced to Binchy's upbringing in Ireland's male-dominated society, and her coming-of-age during the women's liberation movement.

The South Florida Sun-Sentinel praised Binchy for writing "strong and realistic female characters" who possess an inner fortitude to survive the ups and downs of daily life. The Quad-City Times also lauded Binchy's eye and ear for describing the people, conversations, and settings of Ireland of the 1950s.

As of 1998, The Glass Lake was Ireland's best-selling book of all time.

== Adaptations ==
The Glass Lake was produced on an abridged audiobook with a running time of six hours.
