= Minding Frankie =

2010 novel by Maeve Binchy

- First edition
- Author: Maeve Binchy
- Language: English
- Genre: Novel
- Publisher: Orion
- Publication date: 2010
- Publication place: (Republic of Ireland) Ireland
- Media type: Print (hardback & paperback)

Minding Frankie is a 2010 novel by the Irish author Maeve Binchy.

== Plot ==
Emily Lynch arrives from America to the fictional Dublin neighborhood of St. Jarlath Crescent and, in her encouraging and resourceful way, rehabilitates the lives of everyone she meets. The main plot line centers around her cousin, Noel, an alcoholic who still lives at home, who finds out from a dying girlfriend that she is expecting his baby that he doesn't remember conceiving. Noel accepts the challenge of single parenthood with the help of family and friends, including characters from previous Binchy novels Heart and Soul and Scarlet Feather.

== Themes and topics ==
The teamwork involved in caring for the motherless girl named Frankie conveys the message that "everyone's life is better when individuals, communities and governments work together to care for those in trouble".

Binchy has also invested this novel with contemporary topics not seen in her earlier novels set in the mid-20th century. These topics include email, text messaging, redundancy, recession, addiction, cancer, and paternity testing.

== Adaptation ==
Shay Linehan, playwright-in-residence at the Irish Classical Theatre Company, adapted the novel for a 2017 play.
