= Silver wedding =

Silver wedding or Silver Wedding may refer to:

- Silver Wedding (play), a 1957 play by Michael Clayton Hutton
- Silver Wedding (novel), a 1988 novel by Maeve Binchy
- House of the Silver Wedding, the archaeological remains of a Roman house in Pompeii
- Silver wedding, a 25th wedding anniversary
