= A Week in Winter =

2012 novel by Maeve Binchy

- First edition
- Author: Maeve Binchy
- Language: English
- Genre: Novel
- Publisher: Orion
- Publication date: November 2012
- Publication place: Ireland
- Media type: Print (hardback & paperback)
- Preceded by: Minding Frankie (2010)
- Followed by: Chestnut Street (2014)

A Week in Winter is a novel by the Irish author Maeve Binchy. It was published posthumously in 2012. It set a record for the most pre-orders ever for a book on Amazon.com.

== Plot ==
The novel centers around the opening of a guest house in a fictional western Ireland coastal town called Stoneybridge. The personal stories of the proprietress of the guest house, Chicky Starr, the caretakers, and the guests are told in succeeding chapters, with the common theme being each character's search for self-acceptance. Binchy also draws a contrast between the modern-day attachment to mobile phones and social media and the "old world", isolated character of a coastal Irish town.

== Publishing history ==
Binchy completed the novel a few weeks before her death in July 2012. Her editor, Carole Baron, did the "final polish".

The novel was published by Orion in November 2012. It set a record for the most pre-orders ever for a book on Amazon.com.
