= Tara Road (film) =

- Directed by: Gillies MacKinnon
- Written by: Cynthia Cidre; Shane Connaughton
- Starring: Andie MacDowell; Olivia Williams; Stephen Rea; Iain Glen; Jean-Marc Barr; Brenda Fricker
- Cinematography: John de Borman
- Music by: John E. Keane
- Production company: First Look Studios
- Release date: 2005
- Running time: 97 minutes
- Country: United States
- Language: English
- Budget: €10-15 million

Tara Road is a 2005 drama film directed by Gillies MacKinnon, based on the 1998 novel of the same name by Maeve Binchy. The film stars Olivia Williams, Andie MacDowell, Stephen Rea, and Iain Glen and follows Marilyn and Ria - one American, one Irish - on a two-month house swap, as both have suffered crises and need a change.

The film received mixed reviews from critics and had middling box office reception.

== Plot ==
Marilyn Vine, from suburban Connecticut, is grieving the tragic death of her son Dale, which has caused a deep emotional rift in her marriage to Greg. This is because he died on a motorbike his father had gifted him on his 15th birthday. Overwhelmed by this loss and unable to reconnect with Greg, she seeks solitude and a change of environment.

Meanwhile in Dublin, Ria Lynch's world collapses when her husband Danny devastates her as he is leaving her for the younger Bernadette, who is pregnant by him. Stunned by the betrayal, Ria is desperate to escape the pain and uncertainty of her crumbling home life.

By chance, Marilyn rings Danny—whom Greg once met at a business function—and proposes he find her a house for a two-month exchange. Ria agrees by offering her own. With the swap, each hopes the distance will help them find clarity.

In Dublin Marilyn, wanting to be alone, does not divulge the reason for her retreat. She finds quiet comfort in the garden and in the company of local restaurateur Colm. A friend of Ria's, he is upkeeping her vegetable garden over the summer. Ria's best friend Rosemary convinces Marilyn to accept Colm's invitation to his restaurant.

There, Marilyn and Rosemary are soon convinced to join a large group, which includes Danny and the pregnant Bernadette. The boisterous crowd make Marilyn uncomfortable. Rosemary is pressed to sing, but before she can finish Ria's daughter Annie protests that they are carrying on without Ria, and that Bernadette, the woman who split up her parents, is there at all. Uncomfortable, Marilyn leaves.

In Connecticut, Ria tries to rebuild her confidence, takes a job cooking, and bonds with Greg’s brother Andy. After dinner together, she invites him to Irish coffee. He proposes strings-free sex, although they are mutually attracted, she cannot follow through.

In Dublin, Mona McCarthy catches Danny and Rosemary kissing, and it is revealed that they have a long, secret history, predating Ria. Barney McCarthy's company Tara Holdings, Danny's employer, goes under so he is informed that his house Tara Road was used as collateral.

Danny lets himself into the house, startling Marilyn. Saying he is seeking some papers, she insists that Ria OK it, but she is unreachable. Danny demands the car keys, explaining he needs to sell it, but Marilyn holds firm, both retrieving the house key and not allowing him to take the car she is paying the insurance on.

Ria finally finds out about Dale's accidental death through the neighbors when Dale's friend Hubie stops by. Investigating in his room, she finds the video of the accident, as it had happened at his birthday party. Meanwhile, Marilyn accidentally comes across Rosemary and Danny together. Deciding to warn Ria, when she picks up she gives her condolences about Dale, so Marilyn changes her mind.

Ria's kids come over to see their cat before their US trip. Annie asks several direct questions, so Marilyn surprisingly opens up for the first time about Dale's death. Brian comforts her by assuring that Dale must be looking down on her from heaven. Danny later barges into the house for its papers.

Hubie stops by the Vines', where Ria is throwing a surprise party for Greg, to ask for forgiveness. Greg does so without hesitation, then the teen meets Ria's recently arrived Annie and Brian. Ria reveals that Marilyn opened up to the kids about Dale, so Greg flies to Dublin and they reconcile.

Danny flies to see Ria and the kids in the US. He sleeps with her, but in the morning news comes that Bernadette has gone into labor. Before Danny rushes off, he tells the stunned Ria that they are losing the house as the company used it as collateral. Realising he never loved her, she shatters vases as she tries to hit him with them.

Back in Dublin, Marilyn and Mona work together to recover Tara Road. Not only is Danny's affair with Rosemary revealed, but so is Barney's long term one with Polly, which Mona demands he end.

At film end, both women have found renewed strength and a clearer sense of purpose, ultimately returning home changed by the experience and better equipped to move forward.

== Cast ==
- Olivia Williams as Ria Lynch
- Andie MacDowell as Marilyn Vine
- Iain Glen as Danny Lynch, Ria's husband, who works at a property management company
- August Zirner as Greg Vine, Marilyn's English professor husband
- Stephen Rea as Colm Maguire, Ria's restaurateur friend
- Maria Doyle Kennedy as Rosemary Ryan, Ria's best friend
- Sarah Bolger as Annie Lynch, Ria's daughter, the older of her two offspring
- Johnny Brennan as Brian Lynch, Ria's son, the younger of her two offspring
- Eileen Colgan as Nora, Ria's mother
- Jean-Marc Barr as Andy Vine, Greg's Los Angeles residing brother
- Alan Devlin as Barney McCarthy, Danny's boss
- Brenda Fricker as Mona McCarthy, Barney's wife
- Ruby Wax as Carlotta, a flamboyant person who is one of Marilyn and Greg's neighbors
- Jia Francis as Heidi Franks, one of Marilyn and Greg's neighbors
- Heike Makatsch as Bernadette
- Maeve Binchy (cameo) as a restaurant patron

== Production ==
Tara Road is the fourth Maeve Binchy novel to be adapted for film or television. Binchy said she once swapped her house in London to stay in Sydney, Australia, but that the story was not autobiographical "because nothing would be duller than reading about two happily married, settled couples, which is what we and they were", although the trip did inspire the story. She praised the screenwriters for condensing her 600 page novel into a 109-page script.

The filmmakers asked Binchy which location in Dublin she had been thinking of for Tara Road and she told them but the real location proved impractical and they instead found a different location like the one she had in mind. The Kenilworth Square area of Rathgar, Dublin, was the location of titular Tara Road. Caviston's deli and restaurant in Glasthule, Dublin, was used for filming.

Filming took place in Cape Town, South Africa, for three weeks for the scenes set in Connecticut.

== Release ==
The film premiered at the Savoy Cinema, Dublin, on September 29, 2005.

== Reception ==
=== Critical response ===
Michael Dwyer of The Irish Times called it a "sketchy, conventional melodrama" and said the film "has the distinct whiff of a movie made for export, and it lacks the realistic grounding of the only earlier Binchy film, Circle of Friends (1995)." Dwyer was critical of the adaptation from the book, as the editing had left "gaps in the narrative and characterisation." Padraic McKiernan of the Irish Independent was positive about MacDowell's star quality, but found the ending farcical. Aoife Redmond of Film Ireland called it "the kind of film that doesn't take a lot of concentration, but in the end you'll be glad you watched it."

In 2007, producer Noel Pearson called the film a disappointment: "There was no chemistry there, and you could see that on the screen. It was one of those things that just disintegrated from day one. You never know what's going to happen."

=== Box office ===
It topped the Irish box office on the week of its release taking over €200,000, with a worldwide total of over $875,000, mostly from the UK.

== Home media ==
The film was released on DVD on October 9, 2007, and included an interview with author Maeve Binchy.

== See also ==
- The Holiday
