= The Lilac Bus =

1984 short story collection

- First edition
- Author: Maeve Binchy
- Language: English
- Publisher: Ward River Press
- Publication date: 1984
- Publication place: Ireland
- Media type: Print (hardback & paperback)
- Preceded by: London Transports (1983)
- Followed by: Echoes (1985)

The Lilac Bus is a collection of eight interrelated short stories by the writer Maeve Binchy, first published in 1984. The stories were republished by Delacorte Press in 1991 together with the earlier 4-story collection, Dublin 4, under the title The Lilac Bus: Stories.

== Plot summary ==
Set in the 1960s and 1970s, the book follows a group of seven people from the fictional village of Rathdoon in West Ireland, who all live in Dublin and return home each weekend on a lilac-colored minibus. Each chapter focuses on a different character, with events described in a previous chapter making their reappearance with new repercussions.

== Themes ==
The book explores how 20th-century characters with strong Roman Catholic values cope with problems such as alcoholism, homosexuality, unwanted pregnancy, infidelity, drug use, divorce, birth control, and abortion.

== TV movie ==
The book was made into a television movie in 1990, directed by Giles Foster and starring Con O'Neill, Stephanie Beacham, and Beatie Edney.
