= Firefly Summer =

1987 novel by Maeve Binchy

- First edition
- Author: Maeve Binchy
- Language: English
- Genre: Novel
- Publisher: Coronet Books
- Publication date: 1987
- Publication place: (Republic of Ireland) Ireland
- Media type: Print (hardback & paperback)

Firefly Summer is a 1987 novel by the Irish author Maeve Binchy. Set in an Irish small town, this third novel by Binchy depicts the changes that affected the country in the late twentieth century. BBC Radio 4 produced a six-episode, three-hour dramatization of the novel in 2008.

== Plot ==
Set in the 1960s, the plot revolves around the people of a rural Irish town named Mountfern. Patrick O'Neill, an Irish-American businessman, settles with his children in "the land of his ancestors" in order to build a luxury hotel on the site of a derelict mansion. While many of the town's residents are excited about the project's impact on local employment, one of the town's pubs, run by John and Kate Ryan, which is located directly opposite the planned hotel, is threatened with closure by O'Neill's scheme. The novel explores the relationships between the O'Neill teenagers and the Ryan children, as well as the lives of a large cast of secondary characters. As construction crews begin working on the project, Kate Ryan is seriously injured at the site, and the entire town is negatively affected by the unfolding events.

== Themes ==
Like other Binchy titles, the novel depicts the changes affecting Ireland in the late twentieth century. It contrasts the small town's simple pastimes like fishing and swimming with the tastes of the free-spending Americans.

== Reception ==
Firefly Summer was the third book written by Binchy. She wrote it in the cottage she shared with husband Gordon Snell in Dalkey. After the book became a bestseller, she used a portion of the proceeds to purchase the neighboring cottage, which they named "Firefly Cottage".

The Orlando Sentinel praised the novel for combining a "wide-angle view" of the Irish town with an "intimate" look at the lives of its inhabitants, including the main characters, the O'Neills and Ryans, and numerous other residents. The review noted: "Binchy charts both the placidity and turbulence of village life: the secrets hidden behind lace curtains, a young girl's first kiss, children's summer games, unexpected pregnancies, sudden deaths. She is at home in little Mountfern, and she makes us feel as if we also know the place and its people".

== Adaptation ==
BBC Radio 4 produced a six-episode, three-hour dramatization of the novel in 2008.
