= The Copper Beech =

1992 novel by Maeve Binchy

- First edition
- Author: Maeve Binchy
- Language: English
- Publisher: Orion Books
- Publication date: 1992
- Publication place: Ireland
- Media type: Print (hardback & paperback)

The Copper Beech is a 1992 novel by the Irish author Maeve Binchy. Set in the 1950s and 1960s, the storyline follows the lives of eight characters and those closest to them living in a small Irish town, in chapters with interlocking plot elements. Reviews are positive about this novel with an unusual structure.

The novel was recorded as a BBC audiobook in 2007.

== Plot ==
The story opens with the visit of the bishop to this small town in the Holy Year of 1950.

The novel follows the lives of eight people and those closest to them, for about 20 years starting in 1950. Each is the title of a chapter, after the chapter titled by the school: Maddy, Maura, Eddie, Dr. Jims, Nora Kelly, Nessa, Richard and Leo (Leonora). Four of them are classmates in the local school (Maura, Eddie, Nessa and Leo) who were about 10 years old when the bishop visited the town. Two (Nora Kelly and Maddy) are teachers in the school. Richard is older than his cousin and comes from Dublin. Dr. Jims arrived before 1940 as the young partner to the old doctor. They live in the small Irish town of Shancarrig. The graduates of the stone schoolhouse on the hill engraved their initials on a large copper beech tree.

Each chapter is told from the viewpoint of one of the characters, although the plot details often connect across chapters when described from the viewpoint of another character.

Maddy Ross is at loose ends when she finishes school, until Mrs. Kelly offers her the position of Junior Assistant Mistress, teaching the youngest students at the school. Maddy lives with her mother and the two have enough money for Maddy to take on the low paid position. She loves teaching, yet has a hard time making close friends until a new curate arrives in the parish.

Maura Brennan has no choice but to work after her schooling. She has a drunken father and so is happy to work as a live-in chamber maid in Ryan's hotel. Mrs. Ryan prefers that her daughter Nessa does not speak with Maura even though they classmates. Maura falls in love with the barman Gerry O'Sullivan and becomes pregnant. They marry, but the child is born with Down syndrome and Gerry abandons Maura to face it alone. She then works for the Darcys who have opened a new shop in the village. She solves the mystery of Gloria's missing jewels and ends up owning them.

Eddie Barton lives with his seamstress mother. He writes to his pen friend Chris Taylor in Scotland, after Father Barry set students up with pen friends when he is 12. Four years later it turns into love between Eddie and Christine, increasing communication with telephone calls and finally a visit. Both are worried about their appearances and do not know if they will be accepted by the other. Christine comes to Shancarrig and gives a new lease of life to Eddie and his mother.

Jims Blake arrives as the new younger doctor in town, soon the only doctor. He married a local girl in 1940. He and his beloved wife Frances have two daughters and hope for a son. When the son is born in 1946, the mother dies, stunning Dr. Jims, saddening him deeply. Young Declan is raised quite differently from his sisters, with so many people stepping in to fill the hole left by his mother’s death.

Nora and Jim Kelly, the school mistress and master, are dedicated to teaching the children despite their own infertility. Nora's twin sister Helen returns home to visit with her four-year-old daughter, Maria. Helen is killed in a freak road accident, leaving Nora and Jim to care for the child and hope that she can remain with them, though her father is alive in America.

Nessa Ryan thinks her mother is bossy, running the local hotel, and her father is too timid. Nessa grows up to be a person of strong character, choosing the right man for her life. Niall Hayes works hard at the law, yet does not know how to get what he wants in life, until he and Nessa connect.

Richard is the cousin of Niall and is seven years older. After leaving Dublin, Richard joins Niall’s father’s law firm and begins a relationship with the woman Niall also pursued. The narrative follows Richard as he discovers that physical appearance is insufficient for his personal development.

Leonora Murphy, called Leo, is the last child still at home. She lives with her injured soldier father and a mother not quite right. Her teenage life is caught in the tangle her mother has made by shooting a man fatally. Leo thinks she can never be normal again, with the secrets surrounding her. She finds love, which helps her to break down the walls she made for herself. Foxy Dunne from the slums never gives up. He works his way up in life, spends some years working in England and becomes a builder. He helps Leo forget her miseries and leave them behind.

Other characters include Father Brian Barry, Michael and Gloria Darcy, and Father Gunn and his housekeeper Mrs. Kennedy.

The novel ends with the sale of the schoolhouse in 1970, with many of the main characters showing an interest in purchasing it. They put it to new purpose, still serving children.

== Themes ==
The novel follows a changing Irish society in the 1950s and 1960s. Social barriers that divided families for generations begin to fall, as for example a boy from the lowest socioeconomic class ends up marrying the daughter of an army major. Numerous female characters are also depicted as "strong, independent women of the 1950s [who have] no time for silly romances".

== Audiobook ==
The novel was recorded by her cousin actress Kate Binchy as a BBC audiobook in 2007. Other audiobook versions have been recorded, by Barbara Caruso among others, including Fionnula Flanagan.
