= Echoes =

Echoes may refer to:

- Plural of echo, a reflection of sound

== Film and television ==
- Echoes (2014 film), an American supernatural horror film
- Echoes (miniseries), a 2022 Netflix original drama series
- Echoes, a TV series based on the novel by Maeve Binchy
- Echoes, a film starring Mercedes McCambridge
- "Echoes" (Boogiepop), a character in Boogiepop
- "Echoes", the 2007 series finale episode of Code Lyoko
- "Echoes" (Dollhouse), a 2009 television episode
- "Echoes" (Fear Itself), an unaired television episode
- "Echoes" (Hawkeye), a 2021 television episode
- "Echoes" (Stargate Atlantis), a 2007 television episode

== Literature ==
- Echoes (Binchy novel), a 1985 novel by Maeve Binchy
- Echoes (Steel novel), a 2005 novel by Danielle Steel
- Echoes (Time Hunter), a Time Hunter novella
- Echoes (comics), a comic book limited series by Top Cow Productions
- The Echoes, a 2024 novel by Evie Wyld

== Music ==
- Echoes (magazine), a British music monthly
- Echoes (radio program), an American radio program
- Echoes (record label), a Japanese record label and talent agency
- The Echoes (American group), an American vocal trio
- The Echoes (English group)
- The Echoes, Los Angeles group, renamed in 1960 to Innocents
- Echoes, Billy Joel's earliest musical group
- Echoes, a 1965 composition for string quartet by Bernard Herrmann
- Echos, a duo that collaborated with Seven Lions on the 2016 song "Cold Skin"

=== Albums ===
- Echoes (Anggun album) (2011)
- Echoes (Joshua Breakstone album), 1987
- Echoes: The Retrospective, a 1993 compilation album by Camel
- Echoes, alternative title of Gene Clark with the Gosdin Brothers (1967)
- Echoes, 2013 album by Creep
- Echoes (Front Line Assembly album) (2014)
- Echos (Lacrimosa album) (2003)
- Echoes (Modern Jazz Quartet album) (1984)
- Echoes: The Best of Pink Floyd, 2001 compilation
- Echoes (the Rapture album) (2003) or its title track
- Echoes (Maggie Reilly album) (1992)
- Echoes (Livingston Taylor album) (1979)
- Echoes (Will Young album) (2011)
- Echoes (Young Guns album) (2016)
- Echoes, a 2002 album by Matt Bianco
- Echos, Chapter One, a 2005 album by Les Nubians
- Echoes, a 2019 extended play by Modestep

=== Songs ===
- "Echoes" (Pink Floyd song), 1971
- "Echoes" (Klaxons song), 2010
- "Echoes" (1950 song), by Bennie Benjamin and George David Weiss
- Echoes (Uncle Waffles song)
- "Echoes", a 2013 song by August Burns Red from Rescue & Restore
- "Echoes", a 2017 song by Bug Hunter from Torn Between a Couple
- "Echoes", a 1978 song by Camel from Breathless
- "Echoes", a 2019 song by the Cat Empire from Stolen Diamonds
- "Echoes", a 2017 song by Celldweller from Offworld
- "Echoes", a 2004 song by Cult of Luna from Salvation
- "Echoes", a 2015 song by Disclosure on Caracal
- "Echoes", a 1967 song by Gene Clark on Gene Clark with the Gosdin Brothers
- "Echoes", a 2008 song by God Is an Astronaut on their self-titled album
- "Echoes", a 2014 song by Miss May I from Rise of the Lion
- "Echoes", a 1984 song by P-Model from Another Game
- "Echoes", a 2011 song by Riot from Immortal Soul
- "Echoes", a 2006 song by Set Your Goals from Mutiny!
- "Echoes", a 1995 song by Susumu Hirasawa from Sim City
- "Echoes", a 2023 song by Tesseract from War of Being
- "Echoes", a 2017 song by Theory of a Deadman from Wake Up Call

== Other uses ==
- (((Echoes))) or triple parentheses, an antisemitic symbol
- Metroid Prime 2: Echoes, a 2004 video game on the Nintendo GameCube
- Fire Emblem Echoes: Shadows of Valentia, a 2017 video game for the Nintendo 3DS, a remake of Fire Emblem Gaiden
- Dragon Quest XI: Echoes of an Elusive Age, a 2017 role-playing game
- Echoes, a Stand used by Hirose Koichi in the story arc Diamond Is Unbreakable of JoJo's Bizarre Adventure

== See also ==
- Echo (disambiguation)
- Echos, a term in Byzantine music theory
- Echos o' Faith, a 1996 album by The 77s
- Les Echos (disambiguation)
