= Caitlín Maude =

Poet, singer and Irish language activist from Ireland

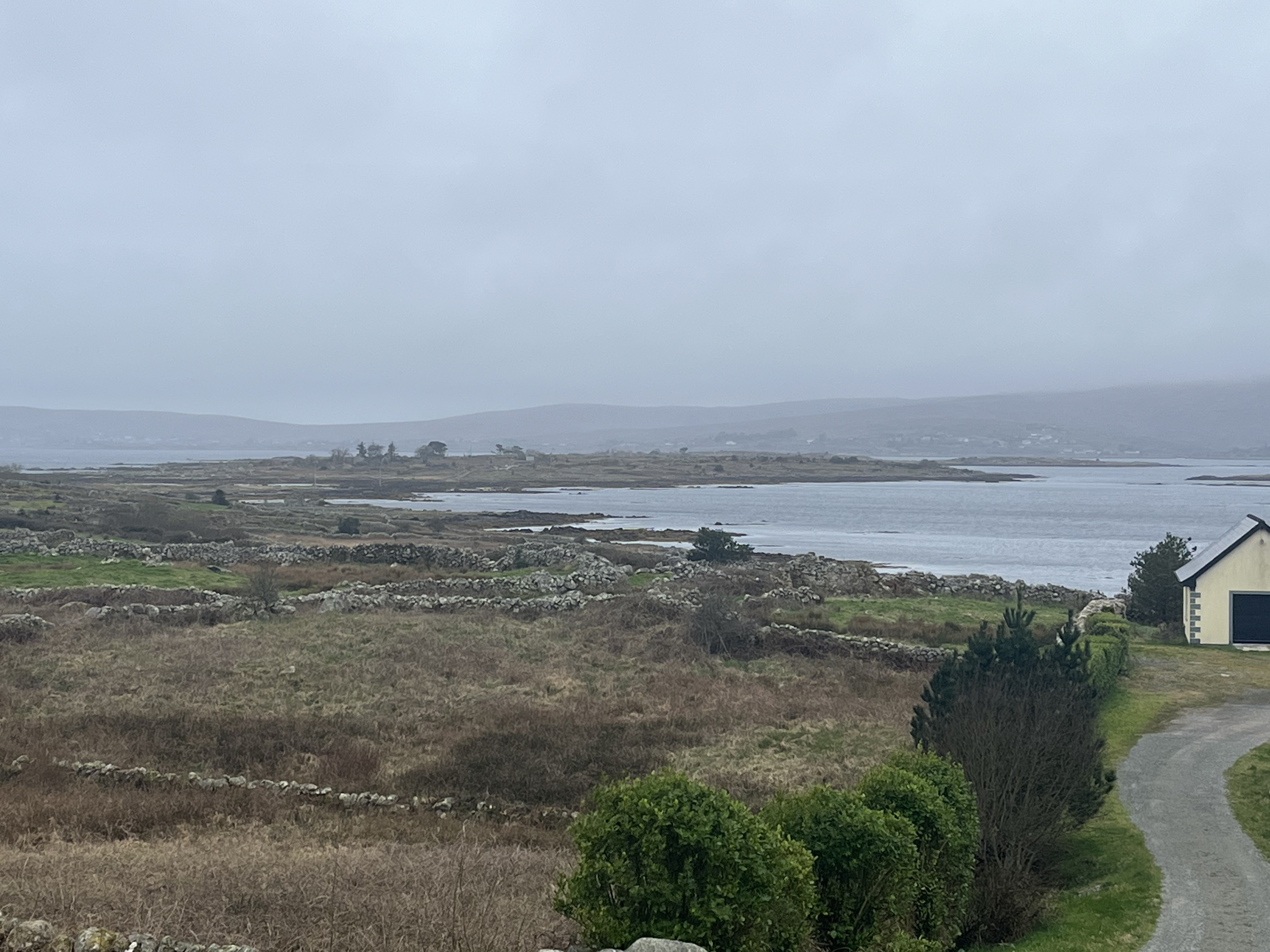
Distant view of island off Rosmuc, Connemara, County Galway, Ireland, where Caitlin Maude was raised

Caitlín Maude (22 May 1941 – 6 June 1982) was an Irish language poet, language revival activist, and actress. She is also well-known for her campaigns to improve the lives of women in Ireland.

== Early life ==
Maude was born in Casla, County Galway, and reared in the Irish language. Her mother, Máire Nic an Iomaire, was a school teacher, and Caitlín received her primary education from her on a small island off the coast of Rosmuc, Connemara. Caitlín's father, John Maude, was from Cill Bhriocáin township near Rosmuc. Maude attended secondary school at Coláiste Chroí Mhuire, Spiddal, an all-Irish language school in County Galway. She would later credit one of her Irish language teachers there, Sister Ailbhe, as an early influence in cultivating her writing confidence.

Caitlín Maude attended University College Galway, where she studied English, Irish, French, and Mathematics. She became a teacher, working in schools in Counties Kildare, Mayo, and Wicklow. She also worked in other capacities in London and Dublin.

== Career ==
Maude began writing modern literature in Irish in secondary school and developed a rhythm of poetry closely attuned to the rhythms of the Conamara Theas dialect of Connaught Irish, spoken in her native district. Though not conventionally religious, Maude admitted in an interview that she had a deep interest in spirituality and that this had left its mark on her poetry. She was noted as a highly effective reciter of her own verse. Géibheann is the best-known of her poems, and is studied at Leaving Certificate Higher Level Irish in the Republic of Ireland. A posthumous collected edition, Caitlín Maude, Dánta, was published in 1984, Caitlín Maude: file in 1985 in Ireland and Italy, and Coiscéim in 1985.

She was widely known as an actress. She acted at the university, at An Taibhdhearc in Galway and the Damer Theatre in Dublin, and was particularly successful in a production of An Triail by Máiréad Ní Ghráda at the Damer Theatre in 1964. She played the protagonist, Máire Ní Chathasaigh, an unmarried mother who experiences family rejection, a stay in a Magdalene laundry, and ultimately murders her infant child followed by suicide. In 2017, Former Irish Minister For Justice Máire Geoghegan-Quinn cited this performance as "pathbreaking": “Caitlín Maude played the role, when nobody talked about the issue and when, as we know, women were still devalued, still caricatured, still incarcerated and disenfranchised if they became mothers out of wedlock." Maude herself was a playwright and co-authored An Lasair Choille with poet Michael Hartnett.

== Activism ==
Maude was very active in the Celtic Revival. She founded An Bonnán Buí, an Irish-speaking social club in the 1970s in Dublin. As a member of the Dublin Metropolitan Gaelgeoir community, Maude was active in many direct action campaigns by the language revival organization Gluaiseacht Chearta Sibhialta na Gaeltachta, including the campaign that forced the Irish State to establish a Gaelscoil (Irish-medium primary school) Scoil Santain in the suburb of Tallaght, County Dublin. A second Irish language school, Scoil Chaitlin Maude, opened in Tallaght in 1985 shortly after Maude died. It began as a two-room school with 35 children and has grown to a 16 room new building serving 345 children as of 2023.

She was also a distinguished sean-nós singer. She made one album in this genre, Caitlín (released in 1975 on Gael Linn Records), now available as a CD. It contains both traditional songs and a selection of readings of her poetry.

== Personal life ==
She married Cathal Ó Luain in 1969. They had one child Caomhán, their son.

== Death and legacy ==
She died of complications from cancer in 1982 aged 41, and is buried in Bohernabreena graveyard, which overlooks the city from the Dublin Mountains.

In 2001, a new writers' centre in Galway City was named after her: Ionad Scríbhneoirí Chaitlín Maude, Gaillimh.

Since her death, critics in several languages have continued to study Maude's literary works. Irish writer and Irish Times columnist Michael Harding cited her as one of a few examples of groundbreaking women to "spin the hurt and wound of their oppression, and weave new loves songs and laments" Irish Studies professor Sarah McKibben noted that Maude's innovation in the poem represents an instance of recent Irish writers transgressing "literary, nationalistic, sociolinguistic and gender norms to craft new ways of writing in Irish."

According to Louis de Paor, "Although no collection of her work was published during her lifetime, Caitlín Maude had a considerable influence on Irish language poetry and poets, including Máirtín Ó Direáin, Micheál Ó hAirtnéide, Tomás Mac Síomóin, and Nuala Ní Dhomhnaill. That influence is a measure of the dramatic force of her personality, her exemplary ingenuity and commitment to the language, and her ability as a singer to embody the emotional disturbance at the heart of a song. Her collected poems are relatively slight, including incomplete drafts and fragments, but reveal a poetic voice confident of its own authority, drawing on the spoken language of the Connemara Gaeltacht but rarely on its conventions of oral composition or, indeed, on precedents in Irish poetry in either language. The best of her work is closer to the American poetry of the 1960s in its use of looser forms that follow the rhythms of the spoken word and the sense of the poem as direct utterance without artifice, a technique requiring a high degree of linguistic precision and formal control."

Maude's work has also been translated into English and Spanish. Spanish language critic Pura Coloma noted that Maude's work played a role in preserving Connemaran culture, as she "utilizes her own style to replicate the deep rhythms and tonalities of the regional voice"

== Sources ==
- Ó Coigligh, Ciarán (ed.) (1984). Caitlín Maude: dánta. Coiscéim.
- Caitlín Maude - Caitlín [CD]. Ref: CEFCD042
