= Damer Hall =

Irish language theatre located in Dublin, Ireland

- Damer Theatre, An Damer, Amharclann an Damer
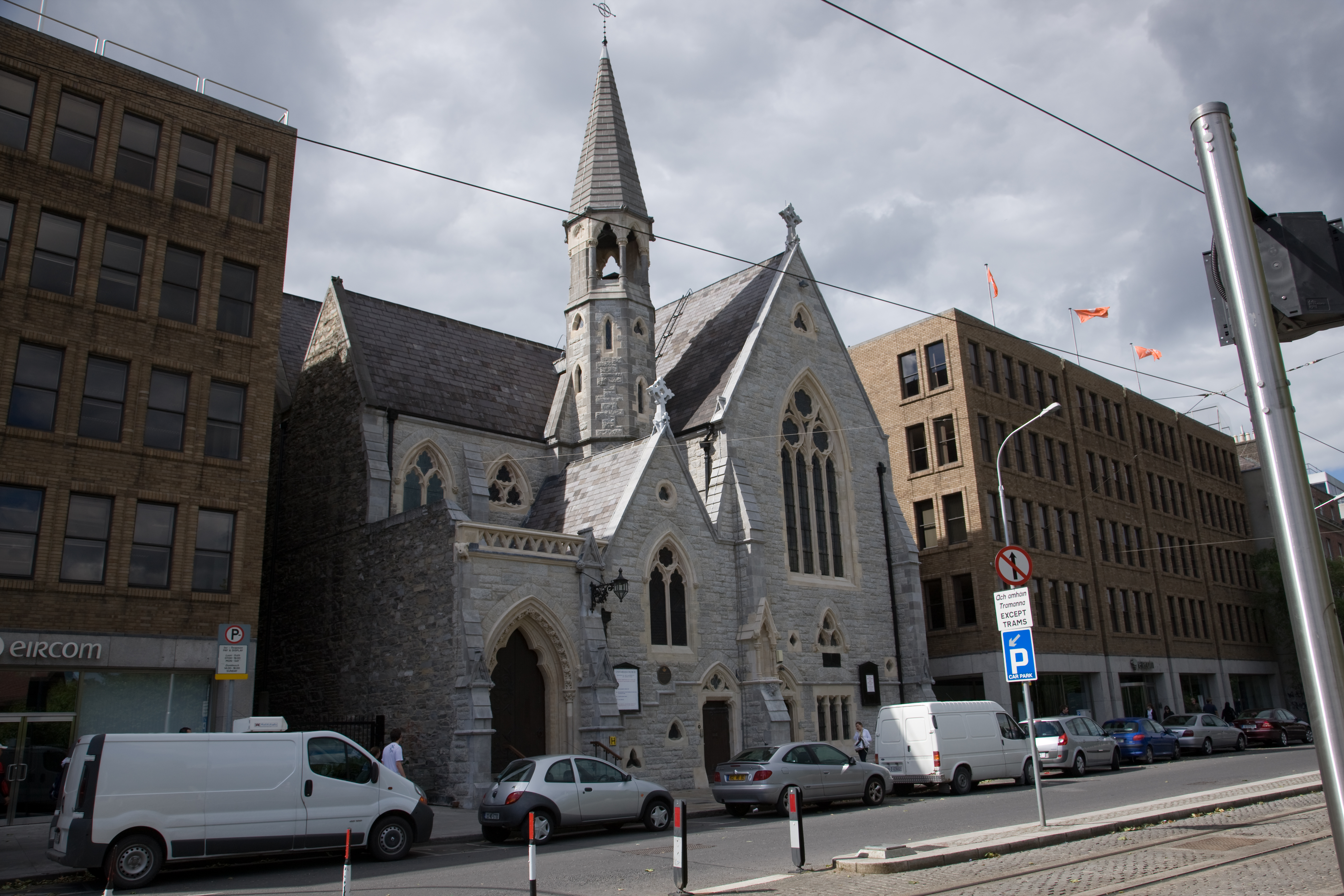
- Damer Hall, situated between the eircom building and the Dublin Unitarian Church

- Location within Central Dublin
- Address: 112 St Stephen's Green; Dublin; Ireland
- Coordinates: 53.338147°N 6.262388°W
- Owner: Dublin Unitarian Church

Construction
- Opened: 1955
- Closed: 1981

Damer Hall, also known as Damer Theatre (Irish: Amharclann an Damer) and An Damer, is a former theatre and former school located in the basement of the Dublin Unitarian Church at 112 St Stephen's Green in Dublin, Ireland.

== Building history ==
From ca. 1718 (or possibly 1725), Damer Hall served as Damer School, a co-educational primary school for Unitarian and Jewish children.

It was funded by the Damer Endowment, a trust bequeathed by wealthy landowner and banker Joseph Damer (1630–1720), great-uncle to Joseph Damer, 1st Earl of Dorchester. His bequests also helped to establish the Damer Institute for destitute widows of St Mary's parish at 27 Parnell Street in 1724.

The school had 3 classrooms and up to 150 pupils. The current building dates from 1863. In a 1905 report, the school was assessed by Sir Charles Alexander Cameron, Professor of Hygiene at the Royal College of Surgeons in Ireland, and rated positively. The school closed in June 1954.

In 1955, the space was leased to Gael Linn who founded the Irish-language Damer Theatre, staging amateur productions. The theatre was described as small, cold and poorly lit but praised for its unique atmosphere. In 1969, Breandán Ó hEithir reported for Raidió Teilifís Éireann's Féach that the Damer had joined with the Abbey Theatre to form An Club Drámaíochta (Drama Club) to produce and promote plays in Irish. Gael Linn withdrew from the project in 1976 but in 1978 it was re-formed as a professional theatre company. The theatre's closure in 1981 was described as the end of the Golden Age of Irish-language theatre. The space continued to be used sporadically for short productions and events such as the Dublin Theatre Festival. It is in regular use by the Royal College of Surgeons in Ireland.

== Theatre productions ==
Brendan Behan's play An Giall (The Hostage) premiered at the Damer in 1958. An Geocach Duine Uasail, Máire Ní Shíthe's translation of Molière's Le Bourgeois gentilhomme, was also performed in Damer Hall in 1958 following its premiere at the Gate Theatre. Seán Ó Riada's opera Spailpín a Rúin had its first performance there on 15 September 1960. Séamus Ó Néill's play Rún an Oileáin (The Secret of the Island) ran from 5 to 10 June 1961. In May 1962, the theatre held its first review, Damertásibh, featuring work by Micheál Mac Liammóir, Niall Tóibín, Eoghan O Tuairisc, Tómas Mac Anna and Sean O Riada, with performances by Áine Ní Mhuirí, among others. Dónall Farmer served as a director for a time. Máiréad Ní Ghráda's play An Triail (The Trial) made its debut at the theatre in 1964. Caitlín Maude was cast in the lead role of Máire in An Triail. She was followed in the role by Fionnula Flanagan in her acting debut. The first stage version of Flann O'Brien's An Béal Bocht took place in the Damer on 31 January 1967, performed by the University College Dublin Cumann Gaelach. Seán Ó Tuama's drama Gunna Cam agus Slabhra Óir was performed at the Damer for the 1968 Dublin Theatre Festival. In 1982, Anne Le Marquand Hartigan's play Beds premiered at the theatre. The Frank McGuinness two-hander play Ladybag, starring Maureen Toal, was performed in the Damer for the 1985 Dublin Theatre Festival. In 1986, Olwen Fouéré starred in Sebastian Barry's debut play, The Pentagonal Dream.
