= James Joyce's Women =

1985 film

- Directed by: Michael Pearce
- Written by: James Joyce; Fionnula Flanagan
- Based on: 1977 play James Joyce's Women by Fionnula Flanagan
- Produced by: Fionnula Flanagan (The Rejoycing Company); Garrett O'Conner
- Starring: Fionnula Flanagan
- Cinematography: John Metcalfe
- Edited by: Arthur Keating; Dan Perry
- Music by: Arthur Keating; Vincent Kilduff
- Distributed by: Universal Pictures
- Release date: 13 September 1985 (US)
- Running time: 88 minutes
- Country: United Kingdom
- Language: English

James Joyce's Women, filmed in 1982 and 1983, is a 1985 released British/Irish period drama film produced by and starring Fionnula Flanagan as writer James Joyce's wife Nora and some of the real women in Joyce's life and fictional women from the writer's novels. The film is based on Flanagan's 1977 play James Joyce's Women.

Flanagan had a role in the 1967 film Ulysses.

== Cast ==
- Fionnula Flanagan – Nora, Harriet Shaw Weaver, others
- Chris O'Neill – James Joyce
- James E. O'Grady – The Interviewer
- Tony Lyons – Leopold Bloom
- Paddy Dawson – Stannie Joyce
- Martin Dempsey – Joyce's Father
- Gerald Fitzmahony – The Dublin Gossips
- Joseph Taylor – Dubliner
- Rebecca Wilkinson – One of Two Washerwomen
- Gladys Sheehan – One of Two Washerwomen
- Gabrielle Keenan – Cissy Caffrey
- Michelle O'Connor – Edy Boardman
- Zoe Blackmore
- Terry Flanagan
- Brian Dunne

== See also ==
- Ulysses (1967 film)
