= Nights of Rain and Stars =

2004 novel by Maeve Binchy

- First edition
- Author: Maeve Binchy
- Language: English
- Genre: Novel
- Publisher: Orion
- Publication date: 25 August 2004 (1st edition)
- Publication place: (Republic of Ireland) Ireland
- Media type: Print (hardcover)
- Pages: 336 (hardcover edition)
- ISBN: 0-7528-5166-7

Nights of Rain and Stars is a 2004 novel by the Irish author Maeve Binchy.

== Plot ==
In a small town in Greece, a group of people witness a boating accident and subsequently become tangled in each other's lives. Thomas is a California university professor escaping from a tense relationship with his remarried ex-wife and their son, whom he adores. Elsa, the beautiful German blonde, resigned from her successful television job to escape her ex-boyfriend, whom she still loves. Irish Fiona couldn't stand her family and friends' resentful attitudes towards her boyfriend, Shane, so she and Shane escaped to peaceful Greece. David, a kind Englishman, doesn't want to take over his father's business as his family expects him to, and instead decides to travel.

These strangers meet in a tavern in peaceful Aghia Anna underneath the stars, and soon they become close friends. Vonni, a native who escaped her family in Ireland many years ago, becomes involved in all their lives and together they form bonds and discover things about each other and themselves that they never could have anticipated.

== Publication history ==
- 2004, Ireland/United Kingdom/Australia, Orion ISBN 0-7528-5166-7, Pub date 25 August 2004, Hardback
- 2004, United States, Dutton ISBN 0-525-94754-X, Pub date 21 September 2004, Hardback
- 2005, United States, Dutton ISBN 0-451-21446-3, Pub date 28 June 2005, Paperback
- 2005, Ireland/United Kingdom/Australia, Orion ISBN 978-0-7528-6536-2, Pub date 29 June 2005, Paperback

== Reception ==
Publishers Weekly wrote, "The setup is flimsy, and the bonds the characters develop are too slender to provide much emotional texture, but Binchy's fans will enjoy this summery page-turner." Donna Meadow wrote for Woman's Day, "The plot is somewhat contrived but Binchy is a good storyteller. It's a good beach read (i.e., not complicated) and certainly put me in the mood to visit Greece."
