= Deeply Regretted By... =

- Written by: Maeve Binchy
- Starring: Joan O'Hara, Dónall Farmer
- Original language: English

Original release
- Release: 1978

Deeply Regretted By... is a 1978 television play starring Joan O'Hara and Donall Farmer, with the script being written by Maeve Binchy. The movie is based upon the Binchy story Death of Kilburn that ran in The Irish Times and deals with issues of bigamy and emigration.

== Synopsis ==
Deeply Regretted By... follows an unnamed London widow who discovers that her marriage was a sham and that her Irish "husband" had deep secrets that he had been keeping from her.

== Awards and honours ==
Deeply Regretted By... won two Jacob's Awards for Binchy's script and Farmer's performance. It also won the Best Script Award at the Prague Film Festival in 1979.
