= Dónall Farmer =

Irish television film director, producer, and actor

- Born: Daniel Patrick Farmer; 24 November 1937
- Died: 6 December 2018 (aged 81)
- Occupations: Television film director, producer, RTÉ Head of Drama and actor
- Known for: Two Jacob's Awards
- Notable work: Glenroe

Dónall Farmer (born Daniel Patrick Farmer; 24 November 1937 – 6 December 2018) was an Irish television film director, producer, RTÉ Head of Drama (succeeding Chloe Gibson) and actor who performed on stage and in film and television productions. Known for his part in Glenroe, the Irish television series in which he played Father Tim Devereux, he won two Jacob's Awards for his work on RTÉ Television, in 1969 and 1979 respectively. A notable contributor to stage productions in the Abbey Theatre, his play parts span 1980–1989. He was also involved in the Irish-language Damer Theatre.

== Filmography ==
Year	Title	Role
1992–2000	Glenroe	Fr. Tim Devereux
1999	Ballykissangel	Eamon
1987	Remington Steele	Sean O’Gleason
1985	Cúirt an Mheán Oíche	An Seanduine Suarach
1983	One of Ourselves	Father Deasy

== See also ==
- Deeply Regretted By...
