= An Triail =

Play by Mairéad Ní Ghráda, written in Irish

- Poster for 2016 Fibín production
- Written by: Máiréad Ní Ghráda
- Characters: Máire Ní Chathasaigh; Bean Uí Chathasaigh; Pádraig Mac Carthaigh; Mailí; Nábla; Dailí; Pailí; Áine ní Bhreasail; Seáinín an Mhótair; Liam Ó Cathasaigh; Seán Ó Cathasaigh; Colm Ó Sé; Bean Uí Chinsealigh; Factory manager Priest; 2 Attorneys; Landlady
- Original language: Irish
- Subject: Prostitution, hypocrisy, Single motherhood, Magdalene asylums
- Genre: Expressionism, social realism, melodrama
- Setting: Rural Ireland and Dublin, 1960s

Premiere
- Date premiered: September 22, 1964
- Place premiered: Damer Theatre, Dublin

An Triail (Irish pronunciation: [ənˠ ˈtʲɾʲiəlʲ]; "The Trial") is a play written by the Irish playwright Máiréad Ní Ghráda. It starred poet and sean-nós singer Caitlín Maude in its first performance in 1964 at the Damer Theatre. Fionnula Flanagan took over the lead role from Maude – it was Flanagan's acting debut. The play was first broadcast on RTÉ radio in 1965, followed by a television adaptation that same year, both starring Flanagan. Flanagan won a Jacob's Award for her "outstanding performance".

The play is written entirely in the Irish language and has been on the curriculum for the Leaving Certificate examinations since at least 2002.

== Plot summary ==
The play is set in Ireland during the 1960s and deals with the pregnancy, and subsequent single motherhood, of a young woman, Máire Ní Chathasaigh. She is shunned by her family after becoming impregnated by Pádraig, a married man and a teacher in the local school, and must leave her parish and move to Dublin to find work to support herself and her child, Pádraigín. Here she is once again marginalised, first for being a single pregnant woman and then for being a single mother. After her accommodation collapses around her child, she moves into a brothel with a prostitute named Mailí who took pity on her. An encounter with the child's father, where he further rejects her and his child, only serves to make matters worse and the girl takes her own life in a similar way to poet Sylvia Plath, as well as that of her child, by natural gas inhalation from her oven.

It often goes back and forth between "flashbacks" (memories of Máire, the protagonist) and the trial. At the beginning, Máire's mother is introduced, and proceeds to state she is a god-fearing woman who has done nothing wrong. Throughout the play, this is typical of most characters.

== Main characters ==
Máire She is the protagonist of the play. Her key flaw is her loyalty. She is very sheltered and naive due to her upbringing. As a young woman she falls in love with Pádraig, a school teacher, at a dance. Máire was raised with no knowledge of men and the like, as her mother raised her to be only a nun. She was only allowed to enter dances due to the priest being there. During the play, Máire's love for Pádraig never falters. Proof of this is seen how, even after his betrayal throughout the flashbacks, she never breaks her promises to "Never to mention [his] name", "Never to write to" him and to "Never tell anyone about" their relationship. When she becomes pregnant, she is thrown out by her mother, and goes to Dublin, where she meets Mailí, a prostitute, who shows her kindness by telling her of the Social Worker's plans to give her baby up for adoption. Máire rejects this plan, and after an accident that caused her house to collapse around her baby while she was at work, Mailí takes her in before she meets with Pádraig. She kills herself and her baby after this meeting, because Pádraig rejects her and anything to do with the child. Throughout the flashbacks in which she and Pádraig meet, she is constantly told that he loves her, and would marry her, were he not married. Hence, when she finds out from a friend, a year later, that his wife died a month after she was thrown out, Máire has an emotional breakdown, and in finding out that he has remarried since, commits the fatal act in the penultimate scene.

Pádraig The school teacher responsible for Máire's pregnancy. During their meetings and even when they met at the dance, he is constantly teasing and testing her, manipulating her, making her feel pity for him while enticing her all the more. He convinces her that he has married her "With this ring, I marry you", although stating beforehand he could not marry her because his own wife, Nóra, is ill but alive. This pretend marriage, which he knows is fake but she does not, is a ploy to try to get Máire to sleep with him. He is unfaithful to his wife as she is dying, and is also unfaithful to his new wife as he goes to the house of ill repute to get the services of a prostitute such as Mailí.

Bean Uí Chathasaigh The mother of Máire, Liam and Seán, an ambitious widow who has made many sacrifices for her children and plans to have her children feed her own ambition. A 'Christian' woman, she forces her son Sean into the priesthood, and tries to force Máire into being a nun until she falls pregnant. Her main worry is not for her daughter but herself being "embarrassed in front of the neighbours!" She tries to give Máire alcohol in order to abort the baby, and stands up in court defending this- "It's not a sin to put an end to something unclean, something damned by God and by people". She seems not to care that her daughter is dead, only that she had been given a Catholic upbringing, and that it was Máire's own fault that she was marginalised.

== North American Premiere ==
The show premiered in North America in its English translation at the University of Pittsburgh Stages Rauh Studio Theatre on April 19, 2019, directed by Nic Barilar. It was presented as part of the Year of Pitt Global, featuring post-show talks from scholars of nearby universities specializing in Irish Culture.

== Reception ==
Chris Morash placed it on a level with Brian Friel's Philadelphia, Here I Come! and Eugene McCabe's King of the Castle.

The play has been on the curriculum for the Irish-language Leaving Certificate examinations since 2002.
