= Circle of Friends (novel) =

1990 novel by Maeve Binchy

- First edition
- Author: Maeve Binchy
- Language: English
- Genre: Drama
- Publisher: Century
- Publication place: Dublin, Ireland
- English publication date: 1990
- Media type: Print (Hardback & Paperback)
- ISBN: 978-0-385-34173-8

Circle of Friends is a 1990 novel by the Irish author Maeve Binchy. Set in Dublin, as well as in the fictitious town of Knockglen in rural Ireland during the 1950s, the story centres on a group of university students. The novel was adapted into a 1995 feature film directed by Pat O'Connor.

== Synopsis ==
In the fictional small Irish town of Knockglen in 1950, an unlikely friendship blossoms between ten-year-old Bernadette 'Benny' Hogan – an overweight, big-hearted, only child of a local merchant – and wiry orphan Eve Malone, raised from birth by nuns in a Catholic convent after her late mother's upper-class Protestant family rejected her. The friendship endures into their teens, as they both attend University College Dublin. There their loyalty to each other is tested by the introduction of more students to their circle, including rugby player Jack Foley and the beautiful and ambitious social climber, Nan Mahon. Benny surprises everyone by winning the heart of the handsome Jack, but things turn sour when Nan attempts to use Eve's family connections to her own advantage. When her plan to snare Eve's wealthy cousin Simon Westward goes awry, Nan is forced into a new plan, one which will break Benny's heart.

A key subplot involves the future of the Hogan family business, Hogan's Gentlemen's Outfitters, thrown into turmoil when Benny's father dies suddenly. Forced to abandon his plan to marry into the business, the efficient but unpleasant Sean Walsh demands a partnership, but Eddie Hogan dies before the agreement is signed. Benny reluctantly plans to honour the agreement; however, when she looks more closely at the business accounts, it reveals Sean may not be the model employee he seems.

== Development ==
Binchy drew from her own experience at University College Dublin for characterization and plot. Like Benny, Binchy had been overweight and clueless about boyfriends upon her arrival at UCD. She too had to return to her parents' home each night rather than stay on campus. As in her experience, campus social life revolved around the student lounge called the Annexe. There Binchy discovered that talking with boys was not as fearful as she had thought, and conveys that experience in her depiction of Benny and Jack becoming friends.

== Themes ==
Among the themes the novel explores are happiness, friendship and love, commerce, and small-town Irish mores. Los Angeles Times reviewer Carolyn See describes:

Is "love" what life is about? Is marriage the cat's meow? Forget what women want—do men even want it? What if people got together for fun instead of love? What if friendship were the highest of all values? ... This is a madly subversive book. It purports to answer such harmless questions as: "What shall I wear?" but is, in fact, an almost perfect handbook on: "How shall I live?"

Binchy similarly counterpoints the commercial aspirations of long-time merchants in the town against the newfangled ideas of two young entrepreneurs. And she pokes fun at Irish small-town life with many vignettes of townspeople "playing telephone", recording their disparate reactions to what is going on around them.

== Reception ==
Circle of Friends was one of Binchy's most popular novels, and one for which she was best known in the United States. Reviewers commended it for its storytelling quality and description of ordinary events with "extraordinary straightforwardness and insight". Publishers Weekly cited the book's "seductive readability". Susan Isaacs in her review for The New York Times concluded: "There is nothing fancy about 'Circle of Friends.' There is no torrid sex, no profound philosophy. There are no stunning metaphors. There is just a wonderfully absorbing story about people worth caring about."

== Adaptations ==
Binchy's cousin, the actress Kate Binchy, narrated an audiobook of the novel in 1991.

A 1995 feature film adaptation was written by Andrew Davies and directed by Pat O'Connor. Binchy attended the Irish premiere at the Savoy Cinema.
