= Quentins =

2002 novel by Maeve Binchy

- First edition
- Author: Maeve Binchy
- Language: English
- Genre: Novel
- Publisher: Orion Books
- Publication date: 2002
- Publication place: (Republic of Ireland) Ireland
- Media type: Print (hardback & paperback)

Quentins is a 2002 novel by the Irish author Maeve Binchy. The title refers to Quentins Restaurant, a fictional upscale dining establishment in central Dublin, Ireland. The restaurant was referenced numerous times in previous Binchy titles; this novel explores its 30-year history as well as the lives of its patrons. The novel was produced as a BBC Word for Word audiobook in 2003.

== Plot ==
Ella Brady, a young science teacher, falls in love with a handsome, suave businessman (Don Richardson) who is married but assures her that his marriage is "dead". For some time she is happy with the torrid affair, and manages to overlook some inconsistencies in what he tells her. Until the moment when he is exposed as a corrupt swindler and runs away out of the country and out of her life – leaving Ella, her family, and many people in Dublin without their savings. Ella is disgraced and quits her teaching job to work more than 60 hours a week at Quentins restaurant, with the Scarlet Feather catering company, and with a film crew, to help out her family.

The book mostly concentrates on Ella's attempt to get funding for her friends' film company for a documentary about the restaurant Quentins. She struggles to get over Richardson, whom she still loves, and with whether or not to give the fraud squad access to a laptop he left in her possession. Eventually, her efforts to get funding lead her to meet a new man, Derry King, an American businessman with an Irish heritage which he hates because of the way his drunken Irish father treated him and his mother.

Smaller plot points revolve around the background of Patrick and Brenda Brennan (the managers of Quentins), Quentin himself, Ella's girlfriends Deirdre and Nuala, and many of the regulars at the restaurant; the main plot is interspersed with various vignettes in the lives of people who had been in contact with the restaurant in one way or another, these interweaving with each other and with Ella Brady's life in various unpredictable ways.

== Themes ==
The novel explores themes of love, family, friendship, and the benefits of hard and honest work. It also examines the "economy-driven Ireland" of the late 20th and early 21st century, as well as themes of celibacy and infertility. The idea of Dublin as a village rather than a city is reinforced, as Binchy reveals it to be "a place where everyone knows everyone and no one's secrets are safe".

== Recurring characters ==
Quentins features appearances by characters from previous Binchy novels, including:

- Nora O'Donoghue and Aidan Dunne from Evening Class
- Brenda and Patrick Brennan from Evening Class
- Tom Feather, Cathy Scarlet, and Maud and Simon Mitchell, from Scarlet Feather
- Ria Lynch and Colm Barry from Tara Road

On a humorous note, the novel also explains why the name Quentins is spelled without an apostrophe.

== Publishing history ==
Quentins is Binchy's 13th book. In 2000 she announced that her upcoming novel, Scarlet Feather, would be her last; she also retired as a columnist at The Irish Times. While she decided to forego writing "big novels", with Quentins she continued producing short stories that link together to advance the plot.

Binchy's cousin, Kate Binchy, narrated the book for a BBC Word for Word audiobook (2003).
