= Maeve Binchy =

Irish novelist (1939–2012)

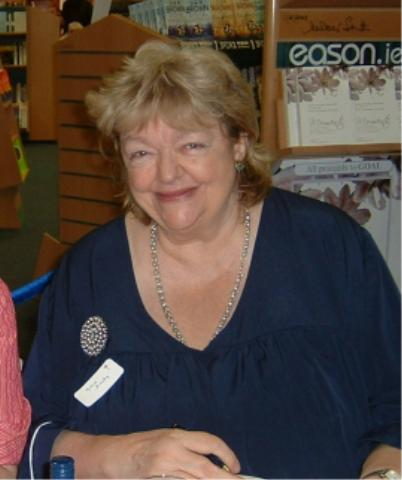
- Binchy in 2006
- Born: Anne Maeve Binchy; 28 May 1939; Dublin, Ireland
- Died: 30 July 2012 (aged 73); Dublin, Ireland
- Education: University College Dublin
- Occupation: Writer
- Spouse: Gordon Snell (m. 1977)
- Relatives: William Binchy (brother); D. A. Binchy (uncle)
- Writing career
- Language: English
- Period: 1978–2012
- Genres: Fiction; play; short story; travel writing
- Notable works: Deeply Regretted By...; Circle of Friends; Tara Road; Scarlet Feather
- Notable awards: Jacob's Award 1978; British Book Award for Lifetime Achievement 1999; People of the Year Award 2000; W H Smith Book Award for Fiction 2001; Irish PEN/AT Cross Award 2007; Irish Book Award for Lifetime Achievement 2010
- Movement: Post-war Irish fiction

Anne Maeve Binchy Snell (28 May 1939 – 30 July 2012) was an Irish novelist, playwright, short story writer, columnist, and speaker. Her novels were characterised by a sympathetic and often humorous portrayal of small-town life in Ireland, and surprise endings. Her novels, which were translated into 37 languages, sold more than 40 million copies worldwide. Her death at age 73, announced by Vincent Browne on Irish television late on 30 July 2012, was mourned as the death of one of Ireland's best-loved and most recognisable writers.

She appeared in the US market, featuring on The New York Times Best Seller list and in Oprah's Book Club. Recognised for her "total absence of malice" and generosity to other writers, she finished third in a 2000 poll for World Book Day, ahead of Jane Austen, Charles Dickens, and Stephen King.

== Biography ==
=== Overview ===
==== Early life and family ====
Anne Maeve Binchy was born on 28 May 1939 in Dalkey, Dublin, the oldest of the four children of William and Maureen (née Blackmore) Binchy. Her siblings include one brother, William Binchy, Regius Professor of Laws at Trinity College Dublin, and two sisters: Irene "Renie" (who predeceased Binchy), and Joan, Mrs. Ryan. Her uncle was the historian D. A. Binchy (1899–1989). Educated at St Anne's (then located at No 35 Clarinda Park East), Dún Laoghaire, and later at Holy Child Killiney, she went on to study at University College Dublin (where she earned a bachelor's degree in history). She worked as a teacher of French, Latin, and history at various girls' schools, then as a journalist at The Irish Times, and later became a writer of novels, short stories, and dramatic works.

In 1968, her mother died of cancer at age 57. After Binchy's father died in 1971, she sold the family house and moved to a bedsit in Dublin.

==== Israel/Faith ====
Her parents were Catholics, and Binchy attended a convent school. However, a trip to Israel profoundly affected both her career and her faith. She later said to Vulture:

In 1963, I worked in a Jewish school in Dublin, teaching French with an Irish accent to kids, primarily Lithuanians. The parents there gave me a trip to Israel as a present. I had no money, so I went and worked in a kibbutz – plucking chickens, picking oranges. My parents were very nervous; here I was going out to the Middle East by myself. I wrote to them regularly, telling them about the kibbutz. My father and mother sent my letters to a newspaper, which published them. So I thought, It's not so hard to be a writer. Just write a letter home. After that, I started writing other travel articles.

One Sunday, attempting to locate where the Last Supper is supposed to have occurred, she climbed a mountainside to a cavern guarded by a Brooklyn-born Israeli soldier. She wept with despair. The soldier asked: "What'ya expect, ma'am – a Renaissance table set for 13?" She replied: "Yes! That's just what I did expect". This experience caused her to renounce her Catholic faith, and eventually become agnostic.

==== Marriage ====
Binchy, described as "six feet tall, rather stout, and garrulous", although she actually grew to 6'1", said in an interview with Gay Byrne of The Late Late Show that, growing up in Dalkey, she never felt herself to be attractive; "as a plump girl I didn't start on an even footing to everyone else". After her mother's death, she expected to lead a life of spinsterhood, saying "I expected I would live at home, as I always did." She continued, "I felt very lonely, the others all had a love waiting for them and I didn't."

However, when recording a piece for Woman's Hour in London, she met children's author Gordon Snell, then a freelance producer with the BBC. Their friendship blossomed into a cross-border romance, with her in Ireland and him in London, until she eventually secured a job in London through The Irish Times. She and Snell married in 1977 and, after living in London for a time, moved to Ireland. They lived together in Dalkey, not far from where she had grown up, until Binchy's death. She described her husband as a "writer, a man I loved and he loved me and we got married and it was great and is still great. He believed I could do anything, just as my parents had believed all those years ago, and I started to write fiction and that took off fine. And he loved Ireland, and the fax was invented so we writers could live anywhere we liked, instead of living in London near publishers.

==== Letter to the president ====
Files in Ireland's National Archives, released to the public in 2006, feature a request from Maeve Binchy to President Cearbhall Ó Dálaigh asking if he could "receive" her. She wrote: "I know you are extremely busy but I often see in the paper that you 'received' so-and-so and was wondering very simply could I be received too." This request came while she was working for The Irish Times in London in 1975.

=== Health ===
In 2002, Binchy suffered health problems related to a heart condition, which inspired her to write Heart and Soul. The book, about what Binchy terms "a heart failure clinic" in Dublin and the people involved with it, reflects many of her own experiences and observations in the hospital. Towards the end of her life, Binchy's website stated "My health isn't so good these days and I can't travel around to meet people the way I used to. But I'm always delighted to hear from readers, even if it takes me a while to reply."

== Death ==
Binchy died on 30 July 2012. She was 73 and had suffered from various maladies, including painful osteoarthritis. As a result of the arthritis she had a hip operation. A month before her death she suffered a severe spinal infection (acute discitis), and she finally succumbed to a heart attack. Gordon was by her side when she died in a Dublin hospital. Just ahead of that evening's Tonight with Vincent Browne and TV3's late evening news, Vincent Browne and then Alan Cantwell, who respectively anchor these shows, announced to Irish television viewers that Binchy had died earlier that evening.

Immediate media reports described Binchy as "beloved", "Ireland's most well-known novelist" and the "best-loved writer of her generation". Fellow writers mourned their loss, including Ian Rankin, Jilly Cooper, Anne Rice, and Jeffrey Archer. Politicians also paid tribute. President Michael D. Higgins stated: "Our country mourns." Taoiseach Enda Kenny said: "Today we have lost a national treasure." Minister of State at the Department of Health Kathleen Lynch, appearing as a guest on Tonight with Vincent Browne, said Binchy was, for her [Lynch's] money, as worthy an Irish writer as James Joyce or Oscar Wilde, and praised her for selling so many more books than they managed.

In the days after her death, tributes were published from such writers as John Banville, Roddy Doyle, and Colm Tóibín. Banville contrasted Binchy with Gore Vidal, who died the day after her, observing that Vidal "used to say that it was not enough for him to succeed, but others must fail. Maeve wanted everyone to be a success." Numerous tributes appeared in publications on both sides of the Atlantic, including The Guardian and CBC News.

Shortly before her death, Binchy told The Irish Times: "I don't have any regrets about any roads I didn't take. Everything went well, and I think that's been a help because I can look back, and I do get great pleasure out of looking back ... I've been very lucky and I have a happy old age with good family and friends still around." Just before dying, she read her latest short story at the Dalkey Book Festival. She once said she would like to die "... on my 100th birthday, piloting Gordon and myself into the side of a mountain".

As a baptised Catholic, Binchy was given a traditional Requiem Mass notwithstanding her agnosticism. Her Requiem Mass took place at the Church of the Assumption, in her hometown of Dalkey. She was later cremated at Mount Jerome Cemetery and Crematorium.

== Work ==
=== Journalism ===
The New York Times reports: Binchy's "writing career began by accident in the early 1960s, after she spent time on a kibbutz in Israel. Her father was so taken with her letters home that "he cut off the 'Dear Daddy' bits," Ms. Binchy later recounted, and sent them to an Irish newspaper, which published them." Donal Lynch observed of her first paying journalism role: the Irish Independent "was impressed enough to commission her, paying her £16, which was then a week-and-a-half's salary for her."

In 1968, Binchy joined the staff at The Irish Times, and worked there as a writer, columnist, the first Women's Page editor then the London editor, later reporting for the paper from London before returning to Ireland.

Binchy's first published book is a compilation of her newspaper articles titled My First Book. Published in 1970, it is now out of print. As Binchy's bio posted at Read Ireland describes: "The Dublin section of the book contains insightful case histories that prefigure her novelist's interest in character. The rest of the book is mainly humorous, and particularly droll is her account of a skiing holiday, 'I Was a Winter Sport.'"

=== Literature ===
In all, Binchy published 16 novels, four short-story collections, a play, and a novella. A 17th novel, A Week in Winter, was published posthumously. Her literary career began with two books of short stories: Central Line (1978) and Victoria Line (1980). She published her debut novel Light a Penny Candle in 1982. In 1983, it sold for the largest sum ever paid for a first novel: £52,000. The timing was fortuitous, as Binchy and her husband were two months behind with the mortgage at the time. However, the prolific Binchy – who joked that she could write as fast as she could talk – ultimately became one of Ireland's richest women.

Her first book was rejected five times. She would later describe these rejections as "a slap in the face [...] It's like if you don't go to a dance you can never be rejected but you'll never get to dance either".

Most of Binchy's stories are set in Ireland, dealing with the tensions between urban and rural life, the contrasts between England and Ireland, and the dramatic changes in Ireland between World War II and the present day. Her books have been translated into 37 languages.

While some of Binchy's novels are complete stories (Circle of Friends, Light a Penny Candle), many others revolve around a cast of interrelated characters (The Copper Beech, Silver Wedding, The Lilac Bus, Evening Class, and Heart and Soul). Her later novels, Evening Class, Scarlet Feather, Quentins, and Tara Road, feature a cast of recurring characters.

Binchy announced in 2000 that she would not tour any more of her novels, but would instead be devoting her time to other activities and to her husband, Gordon Snell. Five further novels were published before her death: Quentins (2002), Nights of Rain and Stars (2004), Whitethorn Woods (2006), Heart and Soul (2008), and Minding Frankie (2010). Her final novel, A Week in Winter, was published posthumously in 2012. In 2014 a collection of 36 unpublished short stories that she had written over a period of decades was published under the title Chestnut Street.

Binchy wrote several dramas specifically for radio and the silver screen. Additionally, several of her novels and short stories were adapted for radio, film, and television. (See List of Works: Films, radio and television.)

== Public appearances ==
Binchy appeared on The Late Late Show on Saturday 20 March (based on chronology, this would have been 1982) in connection with the publication of the Dublin 4 short story collection. "Then the conversation broadened and Gay Byrne asked about some aspects of my work, the royal weddings", Binchy later recalled in a letter she sent to the programme. "I said how much I had liked Charles's wedding and hated Anne's – about covering the election in Ireland and how I had been one of the very few journalists watching FitzGerald and Haughey on the night of the Great Debate..."

Following the publication of Light a Penny Candle, the programme sought Binchy to reappear to explain her success. In advance of her appearance she sent Mary O'Sullivan, who was working on the programme, a letter (the same one referred to above) setting out her earnings in some detail, since Binchy thought this would be of relevance. She received an initial 5,000 Irish pounds for Light a Penny Candle. The paperback rights were sold for a British record for a first novel with a prepublication advance of £52,000 from Coronet. Viking Press paid Binchy $200,000 for the U.S. hardcover edition. The Literary Guild of America paid a further $50,000. The French publisher paid Binchy 50,000 francs. Binchy wrote to O'Sullivan, "I thought it would be better if you knew the exact figures, then you could decide what was and what was not relevant". O'Sullivan republished the letter in the Sunday Independent's Living supplement in 2020 but mentioned that the last page, which followed on from Binchy referring to what she intended to do with all her money, was missing.

In 1994, Binchy appeared on Morningside with Peter Gzowski.

In 1999, Binchy appeared on The Oprah Winfrey Show. In 2009, she appeared on The Meaning of Life, also presented by Gay Byrne. Binchy and her husband had a cameo appearance together in Fair City on 14 December 2011, during which the couple dined in The Hungry Pig.

== Awards and honours ==
In 1978, Binchy won a Jacob's Award for her RTÉ play, Deeply Regretted By. A 1993 photograph of her by Richard Whitehead belongs to the collection of the National Portrait Gallery and a painting of her by Maeve McCarthy, commissioned in 2005, is on display in the National Gallery of Ireland.

In 1999, she received the British Book Award for Lifetime Achievement. In 2000, she received a People of the Year Award. In 2001, Scarlet Feather won the W H Smith Book Award for Fiction, defeating works by Joanna Trollope and then Booker winner Margaret Atwood, amongst other contenders.

In 2007, she received the Irish PEN Award, joining writers including John B. Keane, Brian Friel, Edna O'Brien, William Trevor, John McGahern and Seamus Heaney.

In 2010, she received a lifetime achievement award from the Irish Book Awards. In 2012, she received an Irish Book Award in the "Irish Popular Fiction Book" category for A Week in Winter.

=== Posthumous ===
There were posthumous proposals to name a new Liffey crossing "Binchy Bridge" in memory of the writer. Ultimately the bridge was named for trade unionist Rosie Hackett.

In September 2012, a new garden behind the Dalkey Library in County Dublin was dedicated in memory of Binchy.

In 2014, University College Dublin announced the first annual Maeve Binchy Travel Award. The €4000 award will help student winners "pursue a novel travel trip to enhance their writing skills".

In 2026, a €15 silver proof coin will be issued to honour her.

== List of works ==
=== Publications ===
Binchy published novels, non-fiction, a play and several short story collections. Two collections of short stories, Chestnut Street (2014) and A Few of the Girls (2015), were released after her death.

Novels

- Light a Penny Candle (1982)
- Echoes (1985)
- Firefly Summer (1987)
- Silver Wedding (1988)
- Circle of Friends (1990)
- The Copper Beech (1992)
- The Glass Lake (1994)
- Evening Class (1996)
- Tara Road (1998)
- Scarlet Feather (2000)
- Quentins (2002)
- Nights of Rain and Stars (2004)
- Whitethorn Woods (2006)
- Heart and Soul (2008)
- Minding Frankie (2010)
- A Week in Winter (2012)

Short story collections

- Central Line (1978)
- Victoria Line (1980)
- Dublin 4 (1981)
- London Transports (1983) (London Transports and Victoria Line Central Line consist of the same stories).
- The Lilac Bus (1984)
- The Story Teller: A Collection of Short Stories (1990)
- Dublin People (1993) (Contains two stories included in Dublin 4 in a simplified form.)
- Cross Lines (1996)
- This Year It Will Be Different: And Other Stories (1996)
- The Return Journey (1998)
- Maeve Binchy's Treasury (2013)
- Chestnut Street (2014)
- A Few of the Girls (2015)

Novellas

- The Builders (2002)
- Star Sullivan (2006)
- Full House (2012)

Non-fiction

- My First Book (1970). Dublin: The Irish Times, Ltd. (ISBN 9780950341835)
- Aches and Pains (1999)
- A Time to Dance (2006)
- The Maeve Binchy Writer's Club (2008)
- Maeve's Times: In Her Own Words (2015)

Plays

- Deeply Regretted By... (2005)
- The Half Promised Land (1980)

Other works

- Finbar's Hotel (contributor)
- Ladies Night at Finbar's Hotel (contributor)
- Irish Girls About Town (2002) (editor with Cathy Kelly and Marian Keyes)

=== Films, radio, and television ===
Binchy wrote several dramas specifically for radio and the silver screen. Additionally, several of her novels and short stories were adapted for radio, film, and television.

==== Films ====
- Circle of Friends (1995) – Hollywood film starring Chris O'Donnell and Minnie Driver, based on Binchy's fifth novel, Circle of Friends (1990), with a radical change of ending.
- Tara Road (2005) – Hollywood film starring Olivia Williams and Andie MacDowell and based on Binchy's sixth novel, Tara Road (1998) – which was adopted as an Oprah's Book Club selection in September 1999.
- How About You (2007) – Irish film based on the short story "How About You" (sometimes published as "The Hard Core") and starring Vanessa Redgrave, Joss Ackland, Brenda Fricker, and Imelda Staunton, from the short story collection titled This Year It Will Be Different: And Other Stories (1996).

In addition, the plot of the Danish film Italian for Beginners (2000) was taken in part from Binchy's novel Evening Class without credit or payment to her; the production company later settled with Binchy for a payment of an undisclosed amount.

==== Radio ====
Since 1968, Binchy was a "frequent and hugely popular contributor to RTÉ Radio". A press release dated 31 July 2012 and posted in that organisation's online Press Centre reads:

"RTÉ Radio 1 provided the platform for Maeve's many forays into the world of drama. In 2005 RTÉ 2fm DJ Gerry Ryan was among the cast of Surprise, a four-part radio drama written by Maeve. Other radio drama work included the award-winning Infancy and Tia Maria, starring Oscar winner Kathy Bates. Maeve was a driving force behind the RTÉ Radio 1 Human Rights Drama Seasons, while her story The Games Room was adapted for RTÉ Radio 1 by Anne-Marie Casey in 2009."

==== Television ====
- Deeply Regretted By... (1978) – Binchy won a Jacob's Award for this RTÉ One television play, which was filmed in Ireland and stars Donal Farmer and Joan O'Hara.
- Echoes (1988) – four-part television miniseries on Channel 4, based on Binchy's second novel, Echoes (published in 1985).
- The Lilac Bus (1990) – 90-minute TV movie, starring Stephanie Beacham, Emmet Bergin, and Brendan Conroy, based on Binchy's collection of interrelated short stories titled The Lilac Bus (first published in 1984)
- Maeve Binchy's Anner House (2007) – 90-minute TV movie, filmed in Cape Town, that aired on RTÉ Television. The film stars Liam Cunningham, Flora Montgomery, and Conor Mullen, and is based on a short story by Binchy. The screenplay was written by Anne-Marie Casey.

== See also ==
- List of Fair City characters
