= Les Echos =

Les Echos may refer to:

- Les Echos (France), a French-language financial newspaper published in France
- Les Echos (Mali), a French-language newspaper published in Bamako, Mali

== See also ==
- Echoes (disambiguation)
- L'Echo, a French-language financial newspaper published in Belgium
