= Italian for Beginners =

2000 Danish romantic comedy film

- DVD cover.
- Directed by: Lone Scherfig
- Written by: Lone Scherfig; Maeve Binchy
- Based on: Evening Class by Maeve Binchy
- Produced by: Karen Bentzon; Gert Duve Skovlund
- Starring: Anders W. Berthelsen; Anette Støvelbæk; Ann Eleonora Jørgensen
- Cinematography: Jørgen Johansson
- Edited by: Gerd Tjur
- Music by: Niels W. Gade (non-original)
- Distributed by: Zentropa
- Release date: 8 December 2000
- Running time: 118 minutes
- Countries: Denmark; Sweden
- Languages: Danish; Italian; English
- Budget: $600,000
- Box office: $16.4 million

Italian for Beginners (Danish: Italiensk for begyndere) is a 2000 Danish romantic comedy film written and directed by Lone Scherfig, and starring Anders W. Berthelsen, Lars Kaalund and Peter Gantzler, together with Ann Eleonora Jørgensen, Anette Støvelbæk and Sara Indrio Jensen. The film was made by the austere principles of the Dogme 95 movement, including the use of handheld video cameras and natural lighting, and is known as Dogme XII. However, in contrast to most Dogme films which are harsh and serious in tone, Italian for Beginners is a light-hearted comedy. It was made on a $600,000 budget, and went on to gross over 27 times that.

After the film's release, significant similarities between its plot and that of the novel Evening Class by Maeve Binchy were identified. The distributor, Zentropa, paid an undisclosed sum in compensation to Binchy.

== Plot ==
Andreas, a widowed pastor, arrives in a Danish suburb to take over religious duties from the previous pastor who, due to a crisis of faith after his own wife's death, has become irreligious and even punched the organist, causing him to be hospitalized. Believing his stay will be temporary, Andreas stays in the local hotel where he meets one of the employees, Jørgen Mortensen, who is suffering a crisis as he has been asked to fire the temperamental Hal-Finn who works in the hotel restaurant and is also his best friend. Hal-Finn goes to visit hairdresser Karen and is immediately attracted to her, though his visit is cut short when she must go to the hospital to attend to her alcoholic mother.

Meanwhile, clumsy baker Olympia tends to her disabled and abusive father, who constantly berates her. Olympia decides to join a beginner Italian class in order to feel closer to her Italian mother, but the night she joins the class, the instructor dies. She returns home to find that her own father has died as well. Sometime later she learns that her estranged mother has died as well. At her funeral, she meets Karen, and the two discover that they are sisters and that their parents split them up when they divorced. In order to protect Olympia, Karen does not tell her that their mother was not Italian and was an alcoholic.

After finally being fired for being rude to customers, Hal-Finn becomes the Italian teacher and Olympia persuades both Andreas and her sister to join. Karen and Hal-Finn begin a romantic affair but during Christmas Karen overhears Hal-Finn disparaging her mother, and angrily ends their relationship. Jørgen approaches Andreas for advice about his impotence and his trouble talking to Hal-Finn's Italian friend Giulia, and decides to ask her out for a walk.

In the meantime Olympia receives a letter from the bank telling her of a large inheritance from her father. She decides to spend it taking the Italian class to Venice. In Venice, Jørgen proposes to Giulia who accepts, Karen forgives Hal-Finn after he cuts off his too-long bangs, and Andreas suggests that Olympia, whose clumsy behaviour has caused her to be fired from 43 jobs, come to work as a chorister. He then reveals that he plans to stay in the parish.

== Cast ==
- Anders W. Berthelsen as Andreas
- Anette Støvelbæk as Olympia
- Ann Eleonora Jørgensen as Karen
- Peter Gantzler as Jørgen Mortensen
- Lars Kaalund as Hal-Finn
- Sara Indrio Jensen as Giulia
- Karen-Lise Mynster as Kirsten, the real estate dealer
- Rikke Wölck as Lise, the nurse
- Elsebeth Steentoft as Kirketjener
- Bent Mejding as Reverend Wredmann
- Lene Tiemroth as Karen's mother
- Claus Gerving as Klaus Graversen
- Jesper Christensen as Olympia's father

== Reception ==
=== Critical reception ===
On review aggregator website Rotten Tomatoes, the film has an approval rating of 88% based on 85 reviews, and an average rating of 7.2/10. The website's critical consensus reads, "Unlike many romantic comedies, the charming Italian for Beginners feels natural and genuinely heart-warming." On Metacritic, the film has a weighted average score of 77 out of 100, based on 28 critics, indicating "generally favorable reviews".

Roger Ebert gave the film 3 out of 4 stars, writing that the film was "a charming Danish comedy, and the fact that it’s a Dogma film has little to do with its appeal. Yes, like all Dogma films, it’s shot on video, on location, with only music found at the source–but so what? You see how Dogma changes the subject...", writing that the film was a reminder that works of the movement "need not involve pathetic characters tormented by the misuse of their genitalia, but can simply want to have a little fun," positively comparing it to American independent films.

=== Accolades ===
The film won the Jury Grand Prix Silver Bear at the Berlin Film Festival, the Golden Spike Award for the best film of the year at the Seminci film festival in Valladolid, Spain, and the Audience Award at the Warsaw International Film Festival in Poland. Peter Gantzler won the award for Best Actor at the Seminci festival. The film also won the Gold Dolphin (Best Film) at the Festroia International Film Festival in 2001.

== Literature ==
- Mette Hjort, Lone Scherfig's Italian for Beginners, Museum Tusculanum Press, 2010. ISBN 978-87-635-3483-3.
