= Fionnula Flanagan =

Irish actress (born 1941)

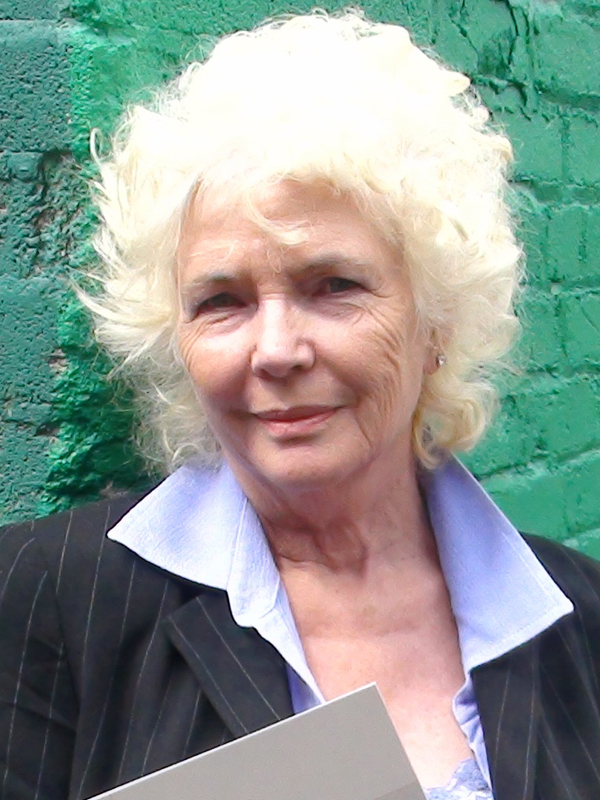
- Flanagan in 2012
- Born: Fionnghuala Manon Flanagan; December 10, 1941 (age 84); Dublin, Ireland
- Education: Abbey Theatre School
- Occupation: Actress
- Years active: 1965–present
- Works: Filmography
- Spouse: Garrett O'Connor (m. 1972; died 2015)

Fionnghuala Manon "Fionnula" Flanagan (born 10 December 1941) is an Irish actress. Flanagan is best known for her roles in the films James Joyce's Women (1985), Some Mother's Son (1996), Waking Ned (1998), The Others (2001), Four Brothers (2005), Yes Man (2008), The Guard (2011), Song of the Sea (2014), The Hunger Games: The Ballad of Songbirds & Snakes (2023), and Four Mothers (2024). She is also known for her recurring role as Eloise Hawking in the series Lost (2007–2010). Notable stage productions she has performed in include Ulysses in Nighttown and The Ferryman, both of which earned her Tony Award nominations for Best Featured Actress in a Play.

For her contributions to the entertainment industry, she was given the IFTA Lifetime Achievement Award in 2012. She was honoured with the Maureen O'Hara Award at the Kerry Film Festival in 2011, the award is offered to women who have excelled in their chosen field in film. She was also nominated for two Primetime Emmy Awards (winning one) and won a Saturn Award. In 2020, she was listed at #23 on The Irish Times list of Ireland's greatest film actors.

== Early life and education ==
Flanagan was born and raised in Dublin, the daughter of Rosanna (née McGuirk) and Terence Niall Flanagan. Her father was an Irish Army officer and Communist who had fought in the International Brigades in the Spanish Civil War against Franco's Nationalists. She was educated at Scoil Mhuire on Marlborough Street, the current headquarters of the Department of Education. Although her parents could not speak Irish, they wanted Fionnula and her four siblings to learn the Irish language; thus she grew up speaking both English and Irish fluently.

== Career ==
Flanagan made her acting debut as the lead role of Máire in Máiréad Ní Ghráda's Irish-language play An Triail at the Damer Theatre in 1964. She continued the role in the radio version and rose to national prominence in the Teilifís Éireann television adaptation, for which she won the 1965 Jacob's Award for her "outstanding performance". With her portrayal of Gerty McDowell in the film version of Ulysses (1967), Flanagan established herself as one of the foremost interpreters of James Joyce. She made her Broadway debut in Brian Friel's Lovers (1968), then appeared in The Incomparable Max (1971) and such Joycean theatrical projects as Ulysses in Nighttown (as Molly Bloom) and James Joyce's Women (1977; toured through 1979), a one-woman show written by Flanagan and directed for the stage by Burgess Meredith. It was subsequently filmed in 1983, with Flanagan both producing and playing all six main female roles (Joyce's wife, Nora Barnacle, as well as fictional characters Molly Bloom, Gerty McDowell, etc.). In 2018 she returned to Broadway in Jez Butterworth's The Ferryman, directed by Sam Mendes.

A familiar presence in American television, Flanagan has appeared in several made-for-TV movies including The Legend of Lizzie Borden (1975) starring Elizabeth Montgomery, Mary White (1977), The Ewok Adventure (1984) and A Winner Never Quits (1986). She won an Emmy Award for her performance as Clothilde in the 1976 network miniseries Rich Man, Poor Man. Her weekly series stints have included Aunt Molly Culhane in How the West Was Won (1977), which earned her a second Emmy Award nomination. She did multiple appearances on Murder, She Wrote, one of them as Freida, a secretary aiding Jessica Fletcher in finding a murderer on the episode Steal me a Story (1987). She later went on to appear in the Murder, She Wrote film The Celtic Riddle (2003) as Margaret Byrne. She played Lt. Guyla Cook in Hard Copy (1987), and Kathleen Meacham, wife of a police chief played by John Mahoney in H.E.L.P. (1990).

She made guest appearances in three of the Star Trek series: Star Trek: Deep Space Nine in episode "Dax", playing Enina Tandro; Star Trek: The Next Generation in episode "Inheritance", in which she played Juliana Soong (Data's "mother"); and Star Trek: Enterprise in episode "Fallen Hero", playing the Vulcan Ambassador V'Lar.

Flanagan guest-starred in several episodes of Lost as Eloise Hawking. She appeared in such films as The Others opposite Nicole Kidman, The Divine Secrets of the Ya-Ya Sisterhood as the eldest Teensy, and Waking Ned. She appeared in television series and stage productions including the Emmy-nominated miniseries Revelations, starring Bill Pullman and Natascha McElhone, and in Transamerica, starring Felicity Huffman. From 2006 to 2008, she played Rose Caffee, the matriarch of an Irish-American Rhode Island family on the Showtime drama Brotherhood.

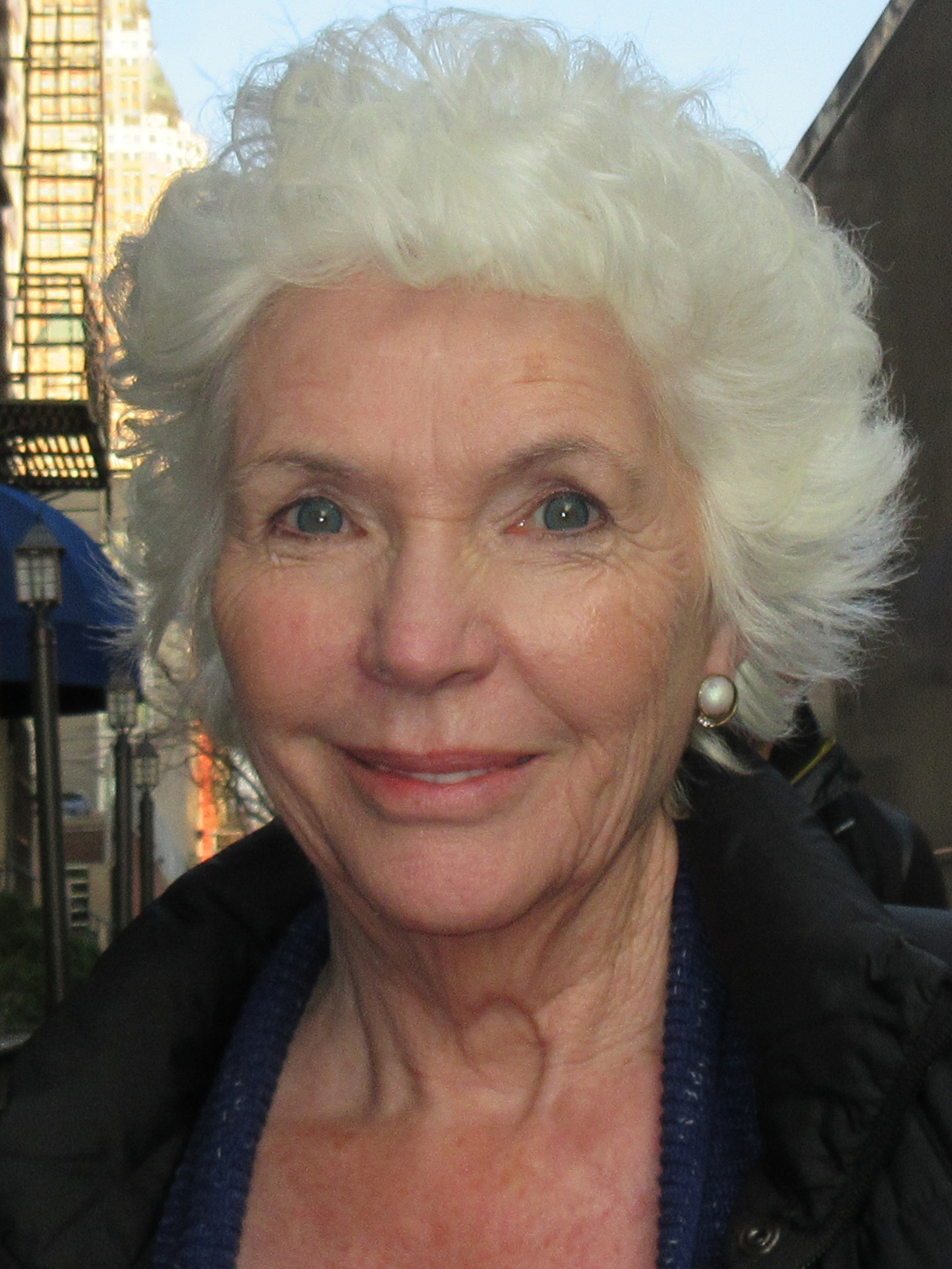
In NYC, April 2018

== Politics ==
Flanagan appeared with Helen Mirren in Some Mother's Son, written and directed by Terry George, as the militantly supportive mother of a Provisional Irish Republican Army hunger striker in 1981. Subsequently, she spoke at a memorial hosted by Sinn Féin at the Citywest Hotel in Dublin for Irish republicans and their kin who were killed during the latest episode of the Troubles in Northern Ireland. Flanagan made €3000 worth of donations to the party at the time.

Flanagan and her late husband Garrett O'Connor, an Irish nationalist from Dublin, were known to host parties at their Hollywood Hills home for people in the Irish community. In July 2009, she joined Sinn Féin president Gerry Adams for a series of lectures across the US supporting Irish unity. In October 2011, she announced her support for Sinn Féin politician Martin McGuinness in his unsuccessful bid in Ireland's 2011 presidential election.

== Filmography ==
=== Film ===
Key
†	Denotes films that have not yet been released.

Year	Title	Role	Notes
1967	Ulysses	Gerty MacDowell	
1969	Sinful Davey	Penelope	
1976	In the Region of Ice	The Sister	Short film
1980	Mr. Patman	Abadaba	
1982	Voyager from the Unknown	Molly Brown	
1984	Reflections	Mrs. Charlotte Lawless	
1985	James Joyce's Women	Harriet Shaw Weaver	
1986	Youngblood	Miss McGill	
1986	A State of Emergency	Diane Carmody	
1987	P.K. and the Kid	Flo	
1992	Mad at the Moon	Mrs. Hill	
1993	Money for Nothing	Mrs. Coyle	
1994	The Pornographer		
1996	Some Mother's Son	Annie Higgins	
1998	Quest for Camelot		Additional Voices
1998	Waking Ned	Annie O'Shea	Nominated–Screen Actors Guild Award for Outstanding Performance by a Cast in a Motion Picture
1998	Paperlily		
1999	Deceit		
1999	With or Without You	Irene	
2001	The Others	Mrs. Bertha Mills	Saturn Award for Best Supporting Actress; Nominated–Satellite Award for Best Supporting Actress – Motion Picture
2002	Divine Secrets of the Ya-Ya Sisterhood	Aimee Malissa "Teensy" Whitman	
2003	Tears of the Sun	Sister Grace McIntyre	
2004	One of the Oldest Con Games	Mary Kuhlmann	Short film
2004	Sexual Life	Grandmother	
2004	Blessed	J. Lloyd Samuel	
2004	Man About Dog	Olivia	
2005	Transamerica	Elizabeth Schupak	Irish Film and Television Award for Best Supporting Actress – Film
2005	Four Brothers	Evelyn Mercer	
2006	The Payback	Galina	
2007	Slipstream	Bette Lustig	
2008	Yes Man	Tillie	
2009	The Invention of Lying	Martha Bellison	
2009	A Christmas Carol	Mrs. Dilber	
2011	The Guard	Eileen Boyle	Irish Film and Television Award for Best Supporting Actress – Film
2011	Kill the Irishman	Grace O'Keefe	
2011	Coming & Going	Irma	
2011	Pass the Salt, Please	Woman	Short film
2013	Angels Sing	Ma	
2013	Tasting Menu	Comptessa	
2013	Life's a Breeze	Nan	
2014	Fearless	Margret	Short film
2014	Song of the Sea	Granny / Macha	Voices; English and Irish-language versions
2015	Come Simi	Aunt Maxine	
2016	Trash Fire	Violet	
2016	Havenhurst	Eleanor Mudgett	
2016	Little Secret	Barbara	
2017	Late Afternoon	Emily	Voice; Short film
2018	Birthmarked	Mrs. Tridek	
2019	Sing Me Back Home [fr]	Marie	
2019	Supervized	Madera Moonlight	
2019	Radioflash	Maw	
2021	Zone 414	Jane's maintenance provider	
2022	The Man from Rome	Cruz Bruner	
2023	Sight	Sister Marie	
2023	The Hunger Games: The Ballad of Songbirds & Snakes	Grandma'am	
2024	Mr. K	Ruth Monchien	
2024	Four Mothers	Alma	
2025	Brown Bread	Betty O'Malley	Short film
TBA	The Body Is Water †	TBA	Post-production

=== Television ===
Year	Title	Role	Notes
1965	Deirdre	Deirdre	Television film
1965	Knock on Any Door	Jenny	Episode: "The Machine Minder"
1966	Insurrection	Nora Connolly	Episode: "Nothing in Heaven or Earth"
1966	Broome Stages	Maud	3 episodes
1966	The Wednesday Play	Eileen	Episode: "Why Aren't You Famous?"
1967	The Wednesday Play	Mona	Episode: "A Crucial Week in the Life of a Grocer's Assistant"
1967	Callan	Rena Clarke	Episode: "Goodbye, Nobby Clarke"
1968	Cradle Song	Joanna	Television film
1968	Cold Comfort Farm	Mary Smiling	Episode: "Folk"
1969	Some Women	Dianne Richards	Television film
1972	Bonanza	Meg Dundee	Episode: "Heritage of Anger"
1972	Mannix	Gloria Paget	Episode: "The Crimson Halo"
1972	Gunsmoke	Sarah Morgan	Episode: "The Drummer"
1972–1976	Marcus Welby, M.D.	Barbara Brendan / Maggie	3 episodes
1973	The Picture of Dorian Gray	Felicia	Television film
1973	The New Perry Mason	Nancy Addison	Episode: "The Case of the Horoscope Homicide"
1974	The Rookies	Judy Karcher	Episode: "Trial by Doubt"
1974	Shaft	Louise Quayle	Episode: "The Murder Machine"
1974	Hec Ramsey	Nellie O'Shea	Episode: "Only Birds and Fools"
1974	The Godchild	Virginia	Television film
1975	The Legend of Lizzie Borden	Bridget Sullivan	Television film
1975	From Sea to Shining Sea	Mary Kennedy	Episode: "The Unwanted"
1975	Movin' On	Laura Brown	Episode: "Love, Death and Laura Brown"
1975	Police Story	Arlene Hansen	Episode: "Company Man"
1976	The Streets of San Francisco	Ellen Simms	Episode: "Requiem for Murder"
1976	Rich Man, Poor Man	Clothilde	Episode: "Part II: Chapters 3 and 4"; Primetime Emmy Award for Outstanding Guest Actress in a Drama Series
1976	Medical Center	Karen Atkins	Episode: "Child of Conflict"
1976	Kojak	Molly Braddock	Episode: "A Summer Madness"
1976	The Bionic Woman	Tammy	Episode: "Road to Nashville"
1976	Serpico	Rita Maloney	Episode: "Every Man Must Pay His Dues"
1976	Nightmare in Badham County	Dulcie	Television film
1977	Hunter		Episode: "The Chand is Burning"
1977	Mary White	Sallie White	Television film
1978–1979	How the West Was Won	Molly Culhane	Main cast (seasons 2–3); Nominated–Primetime Emmy Award for Outstanding Lead Actress in a Drama Series
1979	Young Love, First Love	Audrey Gibson	Television film
1980	Here's Boomer	Bronnie Craddock	Episode: "The Vigil"
1981	Palmerstown, U.S.A.	Sabrina Parker	Episode: "Roadhouse"
1981	Trapper John, M.D.	Warden Clayton	Episode: "Is There a Doctor in the Big House?"
1982	Benson	Rose Sullivan	Episode: "Sweet Irish Rose"
1983	Voyagers!	Molly Brown	Episode: "Voyagers of the Titanic"
1983	Through Naked Eyes	Dr. Frances Muller	Television film
1984	Fame	Dr. Pettibon	Episode: "Sheer Will"
1984	Scorned and Swindled	Margaret	Television film
1984	Caravan of Courage: An Ewok Adventure	Catarine Towani	Television film
1984	Riptide	Melissa Belancourt	Episode: "Peter Pan Is Alive and Well"
1984–1988	Simon & Simon	Dr. Rita Price / Dr. Barbara Bryson / Lydia / Becky	2 episodes
1985	Cagney & Lacey	Arlene Crenshaw	Episode: "The Clinic"
1986	A Winner Never Quits	Mrs. Wyshner	Television film
1987	Hard Copy	Lt. Guyla Cook	4 episodes
1987–1995	Murder, She Wrote	Freida Schmidt / Fiona Delaney Griffith / Eileen O'Bannon	4 episodes
1989	Hunter	Maureen Delaney	Episode: "Shillelagh"
1989	Columbo	Louise	Episode: "Murder: A Self Portrait"
1990	H.E.L.P.	Kathleen Meacham	Main cast
1990	Beauty and the Beast	Jessica Webb	2 episodes
1990	Father Dowling Mysteries	Mother Margaret	Episode: "The Undercover Nun Mystery"
1991	Death Dreams	Dr. Margaret Newberger	Television film
1991	Final Verdict	Pearl Morton	Television film
1992	Reasonable Doubts	Mrs. Hooper	Episode: "A Rose is a Rose"
1993	Star Trek: Deep Space Nine	Enina Tandro	Episode: "Dax"
1993	Star Trek: The Next Generation	Dr. Juliana Tainer	Episode: "Inheritance"
1994	Dr. Quinn, Medicine Woman	Heart	Episode: "The Circus"
1994	White Mile	Gena Karas	Television film
1995	Legend	Julia Grant	Episode: "Legend on His President's Secret Service"
1995	919 Fifth Avenue	Brydie	Television film
1998	Nothing Sacred	Helen Reyneaux	Episode: "The Coldest Night of the Year"
1998	Kings in Grass Castles	Bridget Durack	2 episodes
1998	To Have & to Hold	Fiona McGrail	Main cast
1998–1999	Poltergeist: The Legacy	Narrator / The Older Woman	3 episodes
1999	Chicago Hope	Judge Robin O'Hara	Episode: "Big Hand for the Little Lady"
1999	A Secret Affair	Drucilla Fitzgerald	Television film
2000	For Love or Country: The Arturo Sandoval Story	Sally Lewis	Television film
2002	Star Trek: Enterprise	Vulcan Ambassador V'Lar	Episode: "Fallen Hero"
2003	Murder, She Wrote: The Celtic Riddle	Margaret Byrne	Television film
2003–2018	Law & Order: Special Victims Unit	Sheila Baxter / Madeline 'Maddie' Thomas	2 episodes
2004	Nip/Tuck	Sister Rita-Claire	Episode: "Agatha Ripp"
2004	Jakers! The Adventures of Piggley Winks	Grandma O'Mallard	Voice; 2 episodes
2005	Revelations	Mother Francine	4 episodes
2006–2008	Brotherhood	Rose Caffee	Main cast Satellite Award for Best Supporting Actress – Series, Miniseries or Television Film; Nominated–Irish Film and Television Award for Best Actress in a Leading Role – Television; Nominated–Satellite Award for Best Supporting Actress – Series, Miniseries or Television Film
2007	Paddywhackery	Peig Sayers	Main cast Nominated–Irish Film and Television Award for Best Actress in a Supporting Role – Television
2007–2010	Lost	Eloise Hawking	8 episodes
2010	Three Wise Women	Beth	Television film
2013	Defiance	Nicolette "Nicky" Riordan	8 episodes
2014	HitRecord on TV	Aunt Abigail	Episode: "RE: Money"
2014–2016	Gortimer Gibbon's Life on Normal Street	Miss Hudspith	4 episodes
2017	American Gods	Essie's Grandmother / Old Essie Macgowan	Episode: "A Prayer for Mad Sweeney"
2017	Kat & Alfie: Redwater	Agnes Byrne	Main cast
2018	Origin	Mia Anderson	Episode: "Funeral Blues"
2022	Strike	Oonagh Kennedy	Episode: "Troubled Blood: Part 1"
2023	Smother	Caro Noonan	6 episodes
2023	Sisters	Dymphna	Episode: "This Too Shall Pass"
2023	The Santa Stories	Narrator	Episode: "The Note"
2024	Bodkin	Mother Bernadette	3 episodes
2025	Small Town, Big Story	Wendy's Mother	Voice; Episode: "The White Ridge"
2026	The Young Offenders	Bridget MacSweeney	Series 5, Episode 5

=== Stage ===
Year	Title	Role	Notes
1964	An Triail	Máire	Damer Theatre
1968	Winners	Mag	Vivian Beaumont Theater, Broadway
1971	The Incomparable Max	Mrs. Blake/Usher/Girl Library Attendant	Royale Theatre, Broadway
1974	Ulysses in Nighttown	Applewoman/Crone/Mary Driscoll/Molly Bloom/Mrs. Bellingham/Stephen's Mother	Winter Garden Theatre, Broadway
1977-1979	James Joyce's Women	Nora, Harriet Shaw Weaver, Sylvia Beach, Washerwoman	Global Tour
1988	Ghosts	Mrs. Alving	Roundabout Theatre Company, Off-Broadway
2018	The Ferryman	Aunt Maggie Far Away	Bernard B. Jacobs Theatre, Broadway
2019	A Christmas Carol	Ghost of Christmas Past	Gate Theatre
2020	The Christopher Boy’s Communion	Mrs. Charles	Odyssey Theatre

== Awards and recognition ==
- IFTA Lifetime Achievement gong at the 9th Irish Film and Television Awards
- NUI Galway honorary doctorate awarded for her services to theatrical and film arts
