= William Binchy =

Irish lawyer

William Binchy is an Irish lawyer. He was the Regius Professor of Laws at Trinity College Dublin from 1992 to 2012.

== Education ==
Binchy was educated at University College Dublin. He is a Barrister-at-Law and practised at the Irish Bar from 1968 to 1970.

== Legal career ==
He was a Research Counsellor to the Irish Law Reform Commission and special legal advisor on family law reform to the Department of Justice. He has been a consultant to the Department of Foreign Affairs and represented Ireland at the Hague Conference on Private International Law. Professor Binchy is a member of the Irish Human Rights Commission. He specialises in private international law, the law of torts and family law. In 2010, he was made an Honorary Bencher of the Honourable Society of King's Inns.

He has been involved in a number of campaigns in connection with proposed amendments to the Constitution of Ireland. In particular, he campaigned:

- in favour of the constitutional ban on abortion in 1983 (successfully);
- against the introduction of divorce in Ireland (successfully in 1986, and unsuccessfully in 1995);
- against the restriction of the automatic, constitutional right to citizenship of all of those born on the island of Ireland (unsuccessfully in 2004);
- against the Marriage Equality Bill 2015, to provide for same-sex marriage (unsuccessfully).

Since 2012, he has returned to the Irish bar. and now holds a Professoriate Emeritus at Trinity College Dublin.

== Personal life ==
His uncle was the historian D. A. Binchy. He is the brother of novelist Maeve Binchy. His daughter is the RTÉ producer and former College Tribune editor Sarah Binchy.

== Publications ==
Binchy is a legal researchers and has published books in a variety of areas.

=== Tort law ===
- (with Bryan McMahon) The Irish Law of Torts (3rd edition), 2000, Tottel
- (with Paul Quigley) The Personal Injuries Assessment Board Act 2003: Implications for the Legal Practice, 2004, FirstLaw
- (with Ciaran Craven) Ed., The Civil Liability and Courts Act 2004: Implications for Personal Injuries Litigation, 2004, FirstLaw
- (with Bryan McMahon) Casebook on the Irish Law of Torts (3rd edition), 2005, Tottel
- (with Dr. Dympna Glendenning, Barrister-at-Law) Ed., Litigation Against Schools: Implications for School Management, 2006, FirstLaw
- (with Ciaran Craven) Ed., Medical Negligence Litigation: Emerging Issues, 2008, FirstLaw
- (with Bryan McMahon) The Irish Law of Torts (4th edition), forthcoming 2013, Bloomsbury

=== Family law ===
- Is Divorce the Answer? An Examination of No-Fault Divorce Against the Background of the Irish Debate, 1984, Irish Academic Press
- Casebook on Irish Family Law, 1984, Butterworth
- (with Oran Doyle) Ed., Committed Relationships and the Law, 2007, Four Courts Press

=== Human rights ===
- (with Jeremy Sarkin) Ed., Human Rights, the Citizen and the State: South African and Irish Approaches (co-edited with Jeremy Sarkin), 2001, Roundhall Sweet and Maxwell
- (with Jeremy Sarkin) Ed., The Administration of Justice: Current Themes in Comparative Perspective, 2004, Four Courts Press
- (with Catherine Finnegan) Ed., The Citizenship Referendum: Implications for the Constitution and Human Rights, 2004, Trinity College Law School
- (with Catherine Finnegan) Ed, Human Rights, Constitutionalism and the Judiciary: Tanzanian and Irish Perspectives, 2006, Clarus Press
- Ed., Timor-Leste: Challenges for Justice and Human Rights in the Shadow of the Past, 2006, Clarus Press
- (with Emmanuel Quansah) Ed., The Judicial Protection of Human Rights in Botswana, 2009, Clarus Press

=== Private international law ===
- Irish Conflicts of Law, 1988, Butterworths
- (with John Ahern) Ed., The Rome II Regulation on the Law Applicable to Non-Contractual Obligations: A New Regime, 2009, Brill/Martininus Nijhoff

=== Irish law ===
- (with Raymond Byrne and specialist contributors) Annual Review of Irish Law (annually published, from 1987 to present), Thomson Roundhall
