= D. A. Binchy =

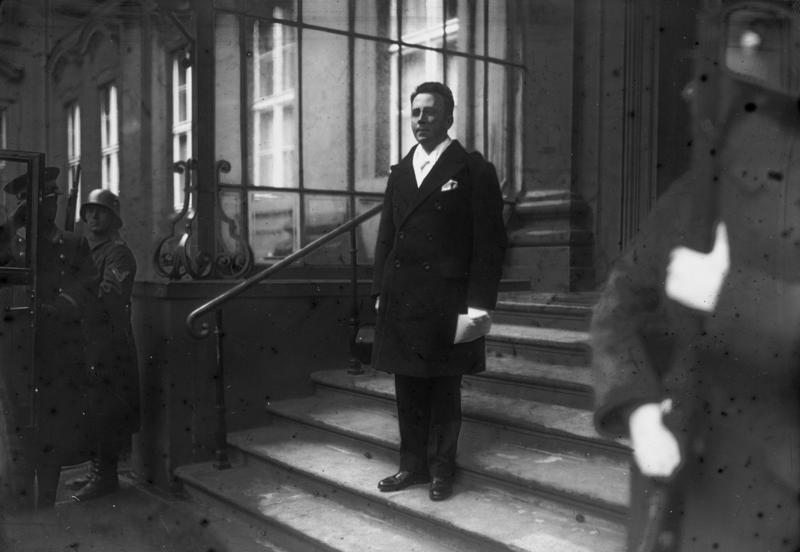
Binchy as ambassador in Berlin

Daniel Anthony Binchy (1899–1989) was a scholar of Irish linguistics and early Irish law.

He was educated at Clongowes Wood College (1910–16), University College Dublin (UCD) and the King's Inns (1917–20) after which he was called to the bar. He also studied at the Ludwig-Maximilians-Universität München, the Friedrich Wilhelm University of Berlin, and the University of Paris. From 1919 to 1920, he was Auditor of the Literary and Historical Society of UCD.

He served the Department of Foreign Affairs in Berlin as Ireland's first ambassador to Germany, then ruled by the Weimar Republic, from 1929 to 1932. While there he received instruction in Old Irish from pioneering Swiss Celticist Rudolf Thurneysen. This allowed Binchy to read original manuscripts and begin his study of early Irish law, focusing on the data it provides for the reconstruction of Celtic and Proto-Indo-European legal traditions. His contributions are also lasting on account of his production of numerous translations and editions of legal texts.

From 1949, he worked as a senior professor of Celtic studies at the Dublin Institute for Advanced Studies. His activities are affectionately satirized in Brian O'Nolan's poem Binchy and Bergin and Best, originally printed in the Cruiskeen Lawn column in the Irish Times and now included in The Best of Myles. He was a close friend of Frank O'Connor.

His final major work, the six-volume Corpus Iuris Hibernici, collected almost all texts in the native Irish legal tradition and thus offers later scholars a firm ground to stand upon.

Binchy was elected a Foreign Honorary Member of the American Academy of Arts and Sciences in 1962. He was the uncle of the author Maeve Binchy and of the academic William Binchy.
