= Circle of Friends (1995 film) =

- Theatrical release poster
- Directed by: Pat O'Connor
- Written by: Andrew Davies
- Based on: Circle of Friends by Maeve Binchy
- Produced by: Frank Price; Arlene Sellers; Alex Winitsky
- Starring: Chris O'Donnell; Colin Firth; Minnie Driver; Geraldine O'Rawe; Saffron Burrows
- Cinematography: Kenneth MacMillan
- Edited by: John Jympson
- Music by: Michael Kamen
- Distributed by: Savoy Pictures (United States); Rank-Castle Rock/Turner (United Kingdom)
- Release date: 17 March 1995
- Running time: 103 minutes
- Countries: Ireland; United Kingdom; United States
- Language: English
- Budget: $15 million
- Box office: $45 million

Circle of Friends is a 1995 romantic drama film directed by Pat O'Connor, and adapted by Andrew Davies from the 1990 novel of the same name written by Maeve Binchy.

The movie was well received by critics and was a box office success.

== Plot ==
Set in 1950s Ireland, the film opens with the First Communion of three friends in the small town of Knockglen: Bernadette "Benny" Hogan, Eve Malone and Nan Mahon. Benny is the beloved and well-fed only child of the local tailor, Eve is an orphan reared by nuns, and Nan is destined to be defined by her beauty. Nan's family moves away to Dublin, and the story skips ahead six years to when the three friends are reunited at university in Dublin.

Benny's loving but overprotective parents insist that she live at home and commute to university. They also hope she will marry her father's assistant, the creepy Sean Walsh. Eve's education is financed by the local landowning family, the Westwards, who employed her father before his death. She has inherited a cottage in Knockglen, but boards at a Dublin convent during the week.

Benny soon falls for Jack Foley, a handsome rugby player studying medicine. She initially assumes she is not sophisticated or pretty enough for him, but after spending time together at the College Ball they begin dating. Eve also begins a relationship with Jack's friend Aidan, and hosts weekend parties for her university friends at her cottage. Nan becomes involved with Simon Westward, heir to the estate in Knockglen. They begin secretly visiting Eve's cottage during the week to have sex.

When Benny's father dies, Benny suspends her studies to care for her mother and run the family shop. Sean attempts to woo her, although she finds him repulsive. Benny notices funds are missing from the business and suspects Sean is responsible, but lacks proof. Eve begins to suspect that someone has been going into her cottage while she is away. Nan suggests that the cottage might be haunted.

Nan becomes pregnant, so tells Simon, believing he will marry her. He instead offers her money for an abortion in England. Nan runs into Jack, who has not seen Benny since her father's funeral. She convinces him to take her to a party and lures him into sex, later pretending that he got her pregnant. Jack is honourable and offers to marry Nan. He tells Benny, who is devastated.

Eve throws another party at the cottage. Nan convinces Jack they should attend, though he feels uneasy about it. Eve, having guessed that Nan has secretly been meeting Simon at her cottage, confronts her and waves a bread knife at her. Nan backs away, falls through a glass door, and is severely cut. Jack attends to her injuries, while Benny leaves the party.

Benny searches Sean's living area for evidence that he has stolen from her family's business. Sean finds her there and attempts to sexually assault her. She fights him off, and in the struggle uncovers the hiding place with the money he has embezzled. Benny orders Sean to leave before she calls the Guards.

Nan decides to begin a new life in England. After Jack sees her off, he tries to win Benny back. He explains that aiding Nan convinced him that he was really meant to be a doctor. He says that he never loved Nan, and is in love with Benny. Benny tells him his actions have changed her and their relationship and they must take their time.

In a voiceover, Benny says Jack addressed his studies and pursued her, while she moved to Dublin to share a flat with Eve. A paper Benny writes causes a stir and points her towards a career as a writer. In time, she falls in love with Jack again.

The final scene shows Benny taking Jack to Eve's cottage. As he follows her inside, she says "Bless me father, for I have sinned," implying they have finally consummated their courtship.

== Cast ==
- Chris O'Donnell as Jack Foley
- Minnie Driver as Bernadette "Benny" Hogan
- Geraldine O'Rawe as Eve Malone
- Saffron Burrows as Nan Mahon
- Alan Cumming as Sean Walsh
- Colin Firth as Simon Westward
- Aidan Gillen as Aidan Lynch
- Mick Lally as Dan Hogan
- Britta Smith as Mrs. Hogan
- John Kavanagh as Brian Mahon
- Ruth McCabe as Emily Mahon
- Ciarán Hinds as Professor Flynn
- Tony Doyle as Dr. Foley
- Tom Hickey as Professor Maclure
- Jason Barry as Nasey Mahon

== Differences from the novel ==
There are several differences between the film and the novel it is based on, with many supporting characters and subplots being omitted from the film. In the book, Benny and Eve grow up together in Knockglen and do not meet Nan until they begin university. Eve's relationship to the Westward family is also a more significant part of the book. Her mother was a Westward but the family disowned her when she married Eve's father, who worked as a gardener on the estate.

The most notable change is the romantic ending added to the movie, with Benny and Jack reunited. In the novel, Benny realizes that Jack is not the perfect man she once believed him to be and that they would not be happy together long term. She is able to forgive him, but declines to get back together with him.

== Soundtrack ==
A soundtrack, Circle of Friends: Music from the Motion Picture, was released in 1995. The music, as for the rest of the soundtrack, was composed by Michael Kamen. "You're the One", a duet by Shane MacGowan and Máire Brennan, was released as a single in June 1995 but failed to chart. The song was described as a "quite exquisite ballad, made all the more affecting by the presence of Clannad's Máire Brennan on shared lead vocals".

== Reception ==
Circle of Friends was positively received by critics, as the film holds a 78% rating on Rotten Tomatoes based on 36 reviews.
