= Evening Class =

1996 novel by Maeve Binchy

- First edition (UK)
- Author: Maeve Binchy
- Language: English
- Genre: Novel
- Publisher: Orion Books (UK); Delacorte Press (US); Little, Brown (Canada)
- Publication date: 1996
- Publication place: (Republic of Ireland) Ireland
- Media type: Print (hardback & paperback)
- Pages: 544 pp (paperback edition)
- ISBN: 9780752804514

Evening Class is a 1996 novel by the Irish author Maeve Binchy. It was adapted as the award-winning film Italian for Beginners (2000) by writer-director Lone Scherfig, who failed to formally acknowledge the source, although at the very end of the closing credits is the line 'with thanks to Maeve Binchy'.

== Plot introduction ==
A story of many Irish men and women from various backgrounds and how a teacher, Nora O'Donoghue (known as "Signora"), and an Italian evening class changes their lives over the course of a year. Each chapter deals with the life story of one or more students in the class. In a Dickensian way, they bump into each other and are affected by the decisions of those around them.

== Major themes ==
The novel deals with themes of love, deceit, family drama, wealth, poverty, friendship, courage, and humour.

== Related ==
Nora O'Donoghue and Aidan Dunne also appear in Quentins, another novel by Maeve Binchy, and play a more significant role in Heart and Soul.

== Film adaptation ==
The novel heavily inspired the plot of the Danish feature film Italian for Beginners (2000), which won a Silver Berlin Bear and several other major international awards. Maeve Binchy was not paid, credited nor informed of this, but was later paid an undisclosed sum, when her publisher contacted the producers of the movie, Lars von Trier's company Zentropa. Although the film's writer-director Lone Scherfig had told the press that the film was based on her idea, executive producer Peter Aalbæk Jensen later admitted that she had made him aware of the similarities but that he had simply decided not to pay the original author.
