= Tara Road =

1998 novel by Maeve Binchy

- First edition cover
- Author: Maeve Binchy
- Language: English
- Genre: Novel
- Publisher: Orion
- Publication date: 28 August 1998
- Publication place: (Republic of Ireland) Ireland
- Media type: Print (Hardback & Paperback)
- Pages: 608 pp (hardback edition)
- ISBN: 0-7528-1447-8 (hardback edition) & ISBN 0-385-33512-1
- Preceded by: Evening Class
- Followed by: Scarlet Feather

Tara Road is a novel by Maeve Binchy. It was chosen as an Oprah's Book Club selection in September 1999. The novel was made into a film in 2005.

== Plot introduction ==
It is the story of two women, one from Ireland and one from United States, who trade houses without ever having met. They're both looking for an escape from their problems, but by running away, both come to discover a great deal about themselves.

The book mostly concentrates on the life of Ria Lynch, the Irish woman, who has met her future husband Danny Lynch. The two end up getting married, much to Ria's shock and delight, and start a family together while Danny's career takes off. Many years into their marriage, Danny begins spending less and less time at home with his wife and children. Ria believes another baby is the solution, and is shocked to find out that indeed her husband is going to be a father...but to a child from an affair he has been having with another woman. Her husband's unfaithfulness is the event that leads Ria into her decision to switch homes with the lady from America.

== Characters ==
- Ria Lynch, housewife whose life collapses when Danny leaves her after he gets a girlfriend pregnant
- Danny Lynch, a heartbreaker who has a woman around every corner
- Rosemary Ryan, a beautiful businesswoman, best friends with Ria though sleeping with her husband Danny
- Annie Lynch, Ria and Danny's first child
- Brian Lynch, Danny and Ria's second child, known for his tactlessness

== Film, TV or theatrical adaptations ==
The novel was turned into a film in 2005. It stars Andie MacDowell and Olivia Williams. Written by Cynthia Cidre and Shane Connaughton and directed by Gillies MacKinnon. Maeve Binchy makes a cameo appearance in the first scene at Colm's restaurant.
