= Whitethorn Woods =

2006 novel by Maeve Binchy

- First edition
- Author: Maeve Binchy
- Language: English
- Genre: Novel
- Publisher: Orion Books
- Publication date: 2006
- Publication place: (Republic of Ireland) Ireland
- Media type: Print (hardback & paperback)

Whitethorn Woods is a 2006 novel by the Irish author Maeve Binchy.

== Plot ==
The plot centers around a supposedly miraculous well dedicated to Saint Anne, mother of the Virgin Mary, located in a grotto overgrown with whitethorn bushes in the woods next to an Irish town called Rossmore. While the parish priest is frustrated by people's allegiance to the well rather than the church, the novel traces the stories of numerous people who find inspiration through the well in many different ways. The town faces a major dilemma as news surfaces that a new highway is scheduled to be built through the woods, which would threaten the well and the peaceful life that the town has enjoyed so far.
