= Silver Wedding (novel) =

1988 novel by Maeve Binchy

- First edition
- Author: Maeve Binchy
- Language: English
- Genre: Novel
- Publisher: Century
- Publication date: October 1988
- Publication place: Ireland
- Media type: Print (hardback & paperback)
- Pages: 272
- ISBN: 9780712622875
- Dewey Decimal: 823.914
- LC Class: PR6052 .I7728 S5

Silver Wedding is a 1988 novel by the Irish author Maeve Binchy. Set in London, Dublin, and the west of Ireland in the year 1985, the novel explores the lives and inner feelings of a couple and their family and friends who are about to celebrate the couple's 25th wedding anniversary.

== Plot ==
The plot surrounds the planning for the upcoming 25th wedding anniversary celebration of Desmond and Deidre Doyle, natives of Ireland who have resided in London since their marriage. They have raised two girls and a boy, all of whom "have turned out to be disappointments". The burden of planning the party falls on Anna, the eldest, who works in a bookshop and is supporting an out-of-work actor. Brother Brendan left the family long ago to live on his uncle's farm in west Ireland, and can't be counted on to even make an appearance. The youngest sister, Helen, who is constantly getting into trouble as she tries to be accepted as a nun, will be no help at all.

As the novel unfolds, each character confronts a personal crisis and must find ways to deal with their challenges. Desmond and Deidre, too, individually grapple with doubts and misgivings about their life choices. The novel further explores the lives of other significant people who attended the Doyles' wedding 25 years before: the bridesmaid, Maureen Barry, who learns after her mother's death that her father never really died; the best man, Frank Quigley, who has loved many women in his life, starting with the bridesmaid; and the priest, Father Hurley, a well-meaning man who struggles with his decision to protect his nephew from being identified as a hit and run driver. Each chapter focuses on the personal story of one character, and all the chapters interlink to weave the complete tale.

== Development ==
The idea for the novel came to Binchy after overhearing a conversation between two girls on a bus. The first girl informed her friend that her parents' silver wedding anniversary was approaching and she had to remember to send a card. Her friend asked if a party was in the works. The first girl replied: "No, it's a dreadful marriage—but the worse the marriage, the bigger the card". Binchy was struck by the girl's "terrible matter-of-fact acceptance" of the situation and conceived a novel in which each character's unhappiness would find resolution.

== Publishing history ==
The novel was published in the United Kingdom by Century in 1988, and in the United States by Delacorte Press in 1989.

== Reception ==
A New York Times review favorably contrasts this work with earlier titles by Binchy, commending the novelist's evolution from writing "skillfull, superior commercial fiction" to creating "an elegant literary construction, a comedy of manners as well as a soap opera". The review continues: "Ms. Binchy is a wonderful student of human nature, and in superb little scenes she subtly articulates their hopes, vanities and delusions". An Orlando Sentinel review praises Binchy for her storytelling skills, and her avoidance of clichés in characterization and plot.

== Audiobook ==
Binchy's cousin, Kate Binchy, narrated the book for a BBC audiobook in 2009.
