= Echoes (Binchy novel) =

Novel by Irish author Maeve Binchy

- First edition cover
- Author: Maeve Binchy
- Language: English
- Genre: Novel
- Publisher: Century
- Publication date: 1985
- Publication place: Ireland

Echoes is a 1985 novel by the Irish author Maeve Binchy. As Binchy's second novel, it explores various themes of Irish small-town life, including social classes and expectations, the paucity of educational opportunities before the introduction of free secondary education in 1967, and women's roles. A four-part television miniseries was adapted from the novel in 1988.

== Synopsis ==
Set in the fictional Irish seaside resort town of Castlebay, the novel follows the lives of several local families between the years 1950 and 1962. The primary three families act as a counterbalance to one another: the wealthy Powers, whose father is the local doctor and mother is a city girl from Dublin; the struggling O'Briens, who eke out a living from the eleven-week long summer season in their grocery-confectionery shop; and the charming but secretive Doyles, whose father runs the local photography concession.

Their children's lives are guided by their social class and expectations: young David Power goes off to Dublin to earn his medical degree, following in his father's footsteps, while young Gerry Doyle stays in the town and inherits his father's business. Only Clare O'Brien seeks to advance beyond her station and go to college. With the help of a local schoolteacher who was herself a scholarship student, Clare earns scholarships to secondary school and university, and ends up at University College Dublin to pursue her degree.

There she falls in love with David Power and they move in together, unbeknownst to their families; but when she becomes pregnant, they are forced to marry. They return to Castlebay so David can begin assuming his father's practice, but Clare is desperately unhappy being relegated to a second-class position in the Power family and in the town. Gerry, who has a secret passion for Clare, tries to entice her away from David, but the book ends with his dramatic death and the strengthening of Clare's marriage.

Subplots revolve around Clare's teacher, whose brother Sean, a priest, has married and had children with a Japanese woman but is unable to obtain a laicization from Rome; Clare's brothers, who go to work in England and one of whom ends up in jail; and upper-class summer visitors from Dublin who become involved with the locals in intimate ways.

== Themes ==
Small-town mores and narrow-mindedness affect the lives of all the characters in Castlebay. The paucity of educational opportunities in small towns before the introduction of free secondary education in 1967 is also a central theme. Binchy explores the opportunities for women afforded by travel and migration, as Clare and David find freedom in Dublin and Sean's Japanese wife enjoys raising her children in England.

== Reception ==
Echoes was Binchy's second novel. It has been cited as one of her most popular titles. It was selected as a Literary Guild alternate.

== Adaptation ==
A four-part television miniseries was adapted from the novel in 1988. The series was produced for Channel 4 by Working Title Films in association with RTÉ.
