= Gordon Snell =

British children's author (1932–2026)

- Born: Gordon Thomas Frederick Snell; 1 October 1932; Singapore, Straits Settlements, British Malaya
- Died: 29 April 2026 (aged 93); Dalkey, Dublin, Ireland
- Education: University of Oxford
- Occupations: Author; scriptwriter
- Spouse: Maeve Binchy (m. 1977; died 2012)
- Writing career
- Notable works: Dangerous Treasure (1994); The Mystery of Monk Island (1995); The Curse of Werewolf Castle (1996); The Phantom Horseman (1997); The Case of the Mystery Graves (1998); The Secret of the Circus (2000); The Library Ghost (2000); Fear at the Festival (2001)

Gordon Thomas Frederick Snell (1 October 1932 – 29 April 2026) was a British author of children's literature and scriptwriter. He was married to Irish author Maeve Binchy from 1977 until her death in 2012. He lived in the home that he shared with his late wife in Dalkey, outside of Dublin, Ireland.

== Early life and education ==
Gordon Thomas Frederick Snell was born in Singapore on 1 October 1932. He was an only child, and lived with parents in Singapore during the British colonisation period. He went with his mother to Australia looking for a boarding school for him. They remained in Australia when Singapore was invaded by the Japanese in February 1942. He attended the Geelong College in Victoria, leaving in 1946. He was separated from his father for three years, who was taken prisoner during the Japanese occupation of Singapore of World War II. After the war, the family moved to the UK. He finished secondary school in Wiltshire. At Dauntsey's School he collaborated in school plays with Adrian Mitchell. Snell attended the University of Oxford, where he was a friend and classmate of Bernard Donoughue.

== Relationship with Maeve Binchy ==
Snell met Maeve Binchy at the BBC where he was a freelance producer. He took his future wife on a hovercraft trip to Boulogne. But, they spent all their time there talking to each other, and never saw Boulogne. He and Binchy married in 1977. Working freelance, they did not have to live near publishers in London, and ultimately moved to her hometown, Dalkey (just outside Dublin). For Snell's 65th birthday, Binchy gave him a surprise gift of a rose variety named after him. In 2011, the couple appeared together on the Irish television soap opera, Fair City. He was by her hospital bedside when she died the following year. At her death, Binchy's estate was valued at ten million euros, two thirds of which went to Snell.

== Writings ==
His books include:

- The Mystery of Monk Island (1995)
- The Curse of Werewolf Castle (1996)
- Dangerous Treasure (1996)
- The Tex and Sheelagh Omnibus (1996)
- Amy's Wonderful Nest (1997)
- The Phantom Horseman (1997)
- Tina and the Tooth Fairy (2005)
- The Supermarket Ghost (2012)

He commissioned and edited the collection Thicker Than Water on growing up, contributed to by Irish and Irish-American writers.

== Death ==
Snell died at his home on 29 April 2026, at the age of 93.
