= Máiréad Ní Ghráda =

Irish poet, playwright and broadcaster

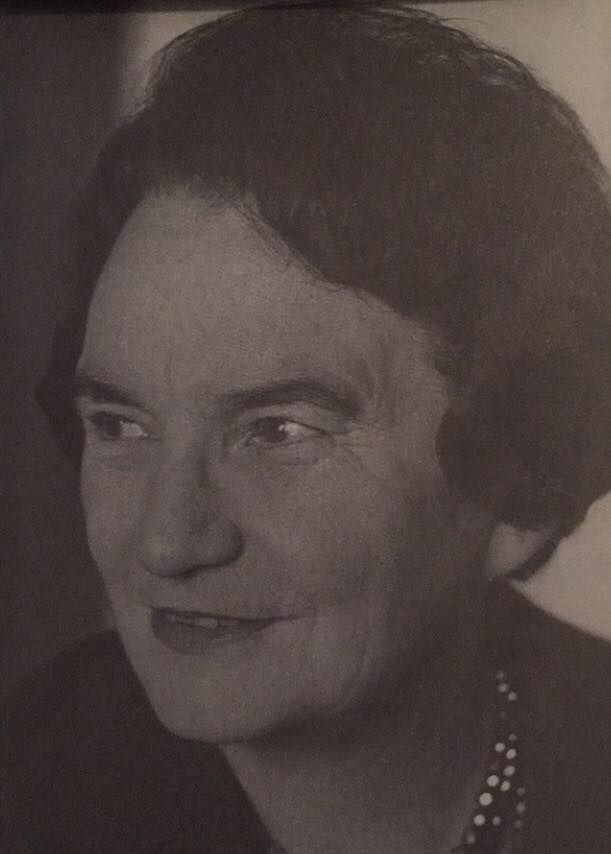
Máiréad Ní Ghráda

Máiréad Ní Ghráda (23 December 1896 – 13 June 1971) was an Irish poet, playwright, and broadcaster born in Kilmaley, County Clare.

== Biography ==
Ní Ghráda's mother was Bridget Ní Ghrianna while her father, Séamas Ó Gráda, was a farmer, local county councillor and a native speaker of Irish. It is thought it was from him Máiréad got her love for the Irish language and he was known to recite ancient Munster Irish poems such as Cúirt an Mheán Oíche.

Ní Ghráda attended Kilmaley national school, secondary school run by the Sisters of Mercy in Ennis, then studied Irish, French and English at University College Dublin.

Ní Ghráda was jailed during the Irish War of Independence in 1921 for selling republican flags, and later she became the secretary to the Cumann na nGaedheal TD Ernest Blythe.

Ní Ghráda was a children's programme compiler on the 1926 radio station 2RN (which went on to become Radio Éireann), later becoming the station's principal announcer in 1929, holding that position until 1935 when she became a part-time announcer.

During this period Ní Ghráda began to write radio and stage productions, and her play Micheál won an Abbey Theatre award in 1933.

== Notable works ==
=== An Uacht ===
Ní Ghráda's An Uacht was first performed in Micheál Mac Liammóir's Gate Theatre in Dublin in 1935. It was performed many times in subsequent decades.

=== An Triail ===
Ní Ghráda is widely known for her 1964 play An Triail which brought her into the public eye, showing the harshness of Irish society and the hypocrisy at the time. While the storyline in An Triail was clearly inspired in part by the fate which befell Sylvia Plath in 1963, the dramaturgy and techniques utilised by Ní Ghráda throughout the play were strongly influenced by Bertholt Brecht. An Triail has been on the Leaving Certificate Irish curriculum since 1997.

=== Breithiúnas ===
Ní Ghráda's play Breithiúnas is well known, and is as an option of study for A-Level Irish in Northern Ireland.

=== Progress in Irish ===
Ní Ghráda is the author of one of the most widely used grammar books on the Irish Language, Progress in Irish.

=== An Grá agus an Gárda ===
An Grá agus an Gárda is a 1937 comedy produced at the Peacock Theatre in Dublin focusing on a complex marital situation. Two years beforehand Ní Ghráda was forced to give up her job in RTÉ when her husband, a senior Garda, was reinstated to his post.

=== Tír na Deo ===
Ní Ghráda's 1938 translation of Peter Pan, the first in Irish.

=== Lá Buí Bealtaine ===
This play in Irish tells the story of two lovers in a nursing home who meet again in a tale of tragedy and love for each other.

=== Manannán ===
Manannán (1940) is regarded as the first science fiction book in Irish.
