= Literary Guild =

American mail order book club

Literary Guild of America
- Logo c. 1929
- Parent company: Bookspan
- Status: defunct
- Founded: 1927; 99 years ago
- Founders: Samuel W. Craig and Harold K. Guinzberg
- Defunct: 15 September 2026
- Country of origin: United States
- Key people: Carl Van Doren
- Official website: www.literaryguild.com

The Literary Guild of America is a mail order book club selling low-cost editions of selected current books to its members. Established in 1927 to compete with the Book of the Month Club, it is currently owned by Bookspan. It was a way to encourage reading among the American public through curated and affordable selections.

== History ==
The Literary Guild was established in 1927 by Samuel W. Craig and Harold K. Guinzberg as a competitor to the Book of the Month Club, which had started in the previous year. Craig asserted that he first incorporated the company in 1922 and reincorporated it in 1926 after hearing of the success of similar book clubs in Germany. In 1929 the founders created a subsidiary operation, the Junior Library Guild, which also continues to this day.

== Method of operation ==
Books are selected by an editorial board. The chairman was Carl Van Doren. The chosen books are printed in special editions identified by the Literary Guild imprint on the title page. They are published on the same date as the trade editions. Charter subscribers were to receive twelve books a year at half the price of the trade editions for an annual fee of eighteen dollars.

== References and sources ==
Sources

- Lee, Charles (1958). The Hidden Public. New York: Doubleday.
- "Literary Guild of America circular". Special Collections and University Archives. University of Massachusetts Amherst Libraries. 1927. mums312-b039-i354.
