= Scarlet Feather =

Novel by Maeve Binchy

- First edition
- Author: Maeve Binchy
- Language: English
- Publisher: Orion Books
- Publication date: 2000
- Media type: Print
- Pages: 560
- ISBN: 0-451-20377-1

Scarlet Feather is a 2000 novel by the Irish author Maeve Binchy. It was the winner of the 2001 WH Smith Literary Award for Fiction.

== Plot ==
The novel follows the fortunes of Cathy Scarlet and her college friend, Tom Feather, who set up a catering business together (the 'Scarlet Feather' of the title). The two are close, but not romantically involved - Cathy is married to Neil Mitchell, the son of the wealthy household where her mother Lizzie used to scrub floors, and Tom is in a relationship with beautiful Marcella, who dreams of being a model. Neil's mother Hannah, against the marriage of her son to the cleaner's daughter, makes life hard for Cathy, while Marcella's ambitions come between her and Tom. There is also a growing distance between Cathy and Neil due to the pressures of Neil's high-profile law career, and Cathy's realisation that her husband sees the business as a hobby.

A key subplot is the arrival of Neil's twin nephew and niece Simon and Maud, whose alcoholic mother and errant father have virtually abandoned them. With Hannah unwilling to allow the children to stay with her and her husband, they are unofficially adopted by Cathy's parents, Lizzie and Muttie, who live in St. Jarlath's Crescent in a far less affluent part of town, but show the children real love for the first time. The twins' older brother Walter reappears in their lives periodically, usually causing trouble, including robbing and vandalizing the Scarlet Feather premises. When the insurance company suspects an inside job, Cathy and Tom are potentially ruined. The pair's battle for survival, and its impact on their respective relationships, is the key theme for the second half of the novel.

== Awards ==
Scarlet Feather won the 2001 WH Smith Literary Award for Fiction.
