= Celtic law =

Legal codes of the Celtic cultural area

A number of law codes have in the past been in use in the various Celtic nations since the Middle Ages. While these vary considerably in details, there are certain points of similarity.

The Brehon Laws governed everyday life and politics in Ireland until the Norman invasion of 1171 (the word "Brehon" is an Anglicisation of breitheamh (earlier brithem), the Irish word for a judge). The laws were written in the Old Irish period (ca. 600–900 AD) and probably reflect the traditional laws of pre-Christian Ireland.

The codification of Welsh law has been traditionally ascribed to Hywel Dda, king of most of Wales between 942 and his death in 950. This was partly an adaptation of previously existing laws however. Welsh law remained in force in Wales until the death of Llywelyn ap Gruffudd in 1282 for criminal cases, and until the Laws in Wales Acts in the mid-sixteenth century for civil cases.

Common features of these codes include an emphasis on the payment of compensation for a crime to the victim or the victim's kin rather than on punishment by the ruler. In other words, all law was tort law, with no "victimless" crimes or crimes against the State.

== Celtic laws in late prehistory ==
While occasional references to "common Celtic law" in academic literature, such as Fergus Kelly's Guide to Early Irish Law, seem to imply that there was one original Celtic law from which the various later Celtic laws, some of which are historically attested (see Brehon law, Cyfraith Hywel), evolved, it is unlikely that anything like 'original Celtic law' (or 'common Celtic law') ever existed as a unified, let alone a codified body of law. Rather, it is currently thought that various central and western European societies in later prehistory, commonly lumped together under the name 'Celts', had individually different customary laws, which evolved out of similar social needs, influenced each other considerably over several centuries or even millennia, and thus ended up reasonably similar to each other.

'Original (or Common) Celtic law' thus can only be reconstructed, and only as a generalisation. Such a generalisation does not reflect actual past legal practice, but can only show which general principles are likely to have been typical for many (but not necessarily all) early Celtic laws.

== Basic workings ==
Celtic law evolved from the judgements of private competing judges. Murray Rothbard describes the system this way:

The basic political unit of ancient Ireland was the tuath. All "freemen" who owned land, all professionals, and all craftsmen, were entitled to become members of a tuath. Each tuath’s members formed an annual assembly which decided all common policies, declared war or peace on other tuatha, and elected or deposed their "kings". An important point is that, in contrast to primitive tribes, no one was stuck or bound to a given tuath, either because of kingship or of geographical location. Individual members were free to, and often did, secede from a tuath and join a competing tuath.

Celtic law is thus a stateless form of law like most customary law forms. "... the professional jurists were consulted by parties to disputes for advice as to what the law was in particular cases, and these same men often acted as arbitrators between suitors. They remained at all times private persons, not public officials; their functioning depended upon their knowledge of the law and the integrity of their judicial reputations."

After the private judge, chosen by the disputants, has made his decision, how was the judgement – the compensation to the victim – enforced?

Through an elaborate, voluntarily developed system of "insurance", or sureties. Men were linked together by a variety of surety relationships by which they guaranteed one another for the righting of wrongs, and for the enforcement of justice and the decisions of the brehons. In short, the brehons themselves were not involved in the enforcement of decisions, which rested again with private individuals linked through sureties.

=== Dating and definition ===
It is problematic to date 'Common Celtic law', and the best we can arrive at are rough estimates. It is quite apparent, by parallels existing between Celtic and other Indo-European laws that at least some of the legal principles that make up Common Celtic law must be very ancient, perhaps going back to the Early Bronze Age or even the Neolithic period. Others may have only developed much later, perhaps even only as a result of contacts with Mediterranean cultures (mainly Greeks and Romans) during the late Iron Age and Antiquity.

In some cases, cognate terms used for parallel practices in the early medieval Irish and Welsh laws allow us to assume that these practices were already used in what is referred to by linguists as the 'common Celtic period', which is usually dated to around 1000 BC (e.g. Kelly 1988, 231), although this at best is a very rough estimate. Where parallels for such practices exist, but with non-cognate terminology, in other Indo-European laws, we can start to consider the cognate practices as specifically Celtic forms of law. Similarly, where such cognate terminology exists for parallel practices in the early medieval Celtic laws, but not in other Indo-European laws, we can consider these to be specifically Celtic laws. As there are hardly any characteristics of Celtic law that cannot be found in at least some other, non-Celtic laws as well, the most sensible definition of Celtic law seems to be one that focuses on the language in which the law is (usually) dispensed. As such, 'Celtic law' would be any law (usually) dispensed in a Celtic language.

=== Sources ===
Quite generally, the oldest textual sources for Celtic laws which give us at least a very general idea of actual practice date from the late Iron Age, roughly the last two centuries BC and the first century AD.

Some evidence can be gathered from the 'usual suspects', like Caesar's De Bello Gallico, who discusses some aspects of Celtic laws in his account of the Gaulish Wars, specifically his famous excursus on the Gauls, but also in some other passages. Some of these passages allow us to confirm the existence, in some Iron Age Celtic laws, of some of the legal principles which can be reconstructed from early medieval Celtic laws as likely elements of common Celtic law, increasing the likelihood of any such generalised reconstruction. Other passages can tell us about particular legal practices in individual Gaulish societies, which are specific for just the society described, without allowing any greater generalisations.

Besides some references in classical authors, there is a small number of texts in Iron Age Celtic languages, some of which (may) contain legal information, too. The most clearly legalistic sources are the Celtiberian inscriptions on Bronze tablets from Contrebia Belaisca (Botorrita), dating from early after the Roman occupation of this area. Botorrita IV might even start with a legalistic formula, '[ tam : tirikantam : entorkue : toutam [|] : sua kombal[ke]z : ...' which could perhaps be interpreted as '...the senate and the people have decided...', mirroring the Roman equivalent. However, these texts are notoriously hard to interpret and not very long either. As such, they are of only limited value, at best allowing to speculate about local legal customs.

To some degree, exceptionally short pieces of textual evidence in Celtiberian also allow to gain some information about what possibly could have been a widespread Celtic legal practice. From Spain, a number of so-called tesserae hospitales, 'hospitality tablets', are known, inscribed in Celtiberian, often with no more than a single word, occasionally with very short sentences. These may indicate a custom of granting hospitality to foreigners, which may have had a basis in customary law and may have allowed to grant legal protection to foreigners, as also found in many other Indo-European societies and the early Irish and Welsh laws.

Finally, there are the archaeological sources, which abound, but are almost impossible to interpret as to their possible legal meanings. Of course, it may occasionally be possible to speculate that an archaeological feature, say, the remains of a fence, may have expressed some legal concept, e.g. ownership of property. But other than that, archaeology remains mostly silent. At best, archaeological evidence can help to strengthen an argument based on reconstructive generalisations from early medieval Irish and Welsh laws, ideally such that are also supported by evidence from historical texts.

=== Principles of Celtic laws in late Prehistory ===
A number of such legal principles, which most likely were widespread in early Celtic laws, can be reconstructed with reasonable degrees of probability. They are mostly centred around kinship and contractual relations, although we have some ideas about criminal law and legal procedure as well. For all of these, we also find reasonably similar principles in either Roman and/or Germanic laws, and in most cases also in other Indo-European laws, making it quite likely that these reconstructions are roughly accurate, even if they lack in detail. Given that many, if not most of them come with an internal Celtic cognate terminology, it is unlikely that they actually are late loans from e.g. Roman provincial law, although some crossovers in legal customs should be assumed. In at least some cases, e.g. in contract law, a co-evolution of Roman, Germanic and Celtic legal systems, based on intensive contact, is likely, even though the contract laws of each subgroup of these larger collectives may already have started out reasonably similar.

==== Kinship ====
Kinship without a doubt played a very important role in Celtic societies in late prehistory. The importance that ancestry had for the late prehistoric Celts is stressed by several classical authors, and seems – at least for some areas, in some periods – also be confirmed in the archaeology by the effort put into burials. The structure of Celtic kin-groups can be reconstructed to some extent, but little of internal kinship relations will have been formalised in a way that could be considered law. There are, however, a number of important legal principles that can be reconstructed, which are related to kinship or external kin-group relations. There is relatively strong evidence for a customary requirement for kin members to support and help each other, in everyday life as much as in legal disputes. This seems to be evident from historical sources, and would fit well with what we find in the early medieval Irish and Welsh laws.

One of the most important legal principles that seems to have been associated with kinship is that of private property, especially the ownership of land and resources. In the very least, differential access to property and resources for different groups in society is evident in the archaeology, indicated both by differential burial wealth and relatively consistent enclosing of settlement space. Most likely, access rights were at least partially based on kinship/descent, as this is the case not only in the early medieval Irish and Welsh laws, but also in the neighbouring Roman and Germanic laws. Even though we cannot be perfectly sure, inheritable individual possession of property and resources, with legal ownership resting with the wider kin-group, is the most likely form of regulating differential access to property and resources in Celtic societies in late prehistory.

The other highly significant legal aspect associated with kinship relations is of sexual unions and reproduction. Inheritance seems to have been passed on primarily in the paternal line, as such, clarifying the relations between partners, who probably quite frequently were members of different kin-groups, as well as their children, must have been quite essential. The surprisingly close parallels between the early medieval Irish and Welsh laws where sexual unions are concerned, and the similarity between the most prestigious union described in them with the Gaulish marriage as described by Caesar, indicate that the treatment of different sexual unions was quite similar over wide areas of western Europe from late prehistory well into the medieval period.

We also know that, at least amongst the Gaulish and the early medieval Irish nobility, polygyny was a widespread practice. Given the detail given to different kinds of sexual union in early medieval Welsh law, it seems reasonable to assume that polygyny was also common in Wales some time before the law-texts were put into writing. Given that the main focus in the early medieval Irish laws where sexual unions are concerned are with the contribution to and division of assets of the union in case of divorce, as well as the responsibilities towards children resulting from these unions, it is quite likely that similar provisions also were at the core of earlier Celtic laws' treatments of the matter of sexual unions. This also seems to correspond with the significance attributed to the equal contribution of assets by Caesar, while the fact that he assumes that the man would have owned more property than contributed by the wife would fit well with the possibility of several different kinds of recognised sexual unions, some with greater, some with lesser or no contributions by the female partner.

While we have no direct evidence from late prehistory that divorce was possible, it is likely that the possibility existed – again, this seems to be indicated by the emphasis on the joint accounting of input and profits made during the existence of the marriage, which would have proven at least as useful in case of a divorce as it would for the reason given by Caesar, to determine the inheritance of the partner who survived the other.

It is likely that there were other elements covering various issues of kinship relations in early Celtic laws, for instance covering adoption, expulsion of antisocial kin members, and inheritance rules in case that a whole lineage would be heirless, but there is too little available information on this subject from late prehistory to allow for more than a generalisation of similarities in these areas as found in early medieval Irish and Welsh law.

==== Artificial kinship ====
With kinship being an essential element in early Celtic legal systems, it seems likely that artificial kinship, in the form of fosterage, was also an important element of these early customary laws. Evidence for the exchange of children as hostages can frequently be found in historical sources, which, as most of them were the children of important nobles, must have been educated during this time, as they would have been expected to become important nobles themselves in the future. Similarly, the reference in Caesar that many Gauls send their children to study druidry, which is best to be studied in Britain at its alleged point of origin, together with his remark that the Gauls do not suffer to be seen with their children in public, might indicate that fosterage practices were widespread. This would seem to be supported by the fact that fosterage was important in both early medieval Irish and Welsh societies, and that there is a cognate terminology in Irish and Welsh for the foster-father/teacher, allowing to reconstruct a Celt. *altros, 'nourisher, foster-father, teacher', as well as close friend/foster sibling, from Celt. *komaltros, 'jointly nourished, co-fostered, alumni'. Fosterage networks, establishing artificial kinship and thus political and information exchange networks also are a good explanation for the spread of some aspects of 'Celtic' material culture, like e.g. La Tène art.

==== Rank ====
Another principle that seems to have been pretty widespread in early Celtic laws is that of the importance of social rank. It is not clear whether, in late prehistory, it was equally detailed as Irish law seems to indicate for early medieval Ireland. However, it seems rather evident from statements like the one of Caesar that "... those most distinguished by birth and wealth have the greatest number of vassals and clients about them. They acknowledge only this as influence and power", which is an almost perfect summary of the requirements set for different noble ranks in the early medieval Irish lawtext Críth Gablach, that rank must have been an important element of Iron Age Gaulish customary law, too.

While we do not know what precise advantages higher social rank may have carried, it is quite likely that there were some legal privileges for people of higher social rank. As Caesar reports that the leaders of the Gaulish factions are those with the greatest influence, whose opinion is most highly thought of, it is quite likely that such differences in rank also had consequences in legal proceedings, much like in the Irish case.

==== Contracts ====
The regulation of contractual relationships is one of the most important elements in any legal system, and especially so in societies where there is a lack of a strong central state, enforcing codified law. Where Celtic societies in late prehistory are concerned, all evidence points to such an absence of a strong central state control, and a largely kin-based enforcement of legal claims. The regulation of contractual relationships therefore most likely formed the single most essential element of all early Celtic laws.

As such, it is hardly surprising that some of the most obvious similarities, and the largest body of cognate terminology from late prehistory and between Irish and Welsh, in case of the latter two associated with parallel practices, exists. Close terminological similarities or cognates can be found for witnesses, sureties, pledges, and distraint, which partially even extend into Germanic legal terminology, the latter supporting the archaeological argument that close trade links existed between late prehistoric Celtic and Germanic societies. Generally speaking, all these elements are also common in other early Indo-European laws. Historical texts also provide considerable evidence that later prehistoric contracts were secured with either pledges or sureties, the best example once again provided by Caesar, who reports that for the securing of a coordinated revolt against Caesar, the Gauls, "since they could not take the usual precaution of giving and receiving hostages, as that would have given away their plans, they asked that a solemn oath on their military standards be sworn, in which manner their most sacred obligations are made binding". That children of nobles were frequently used as hostages (i.e. pledges) in state contracts, also between Celtic and Germanic polities, is also well documented in the historical evidence.

Celtic contract laws seem to have distinguished between two main kinds of contracts, such that were either immediately actionable or short-term and/or involved only very little risk, and such that were either long-term or established semi-permanent relationships, and/or involved high risks. While it would seem to have been sufficient to secure the first by just providing sureties, the second ones usually would have required both sureties and pledges. It is also quite likely that there was at least some degree of distinction between two different kinds of pledges, minor pledges on the one hand, and hostages on the other; and two kinds of sureties, one who would stand in as a surrogate for the original contracting party if that failed to fulfil its obligations, and one who would have the right to enforce the obligations of said party. Particularly the latter would also have had an important role in the development of hierarchy in late prehistoric Celtic societies, with regularly approached enforcing sureties at some point being able to institutionalise their position as a social superior of those who frequently required their services, particularly if approached as an enforcing surety by all contracting parties.

Contractual relationships most likely were of particularly great significance in ordinary subsistence economy. One of the close similarities that exists between early medieval Irish and Welsh laws is a cooperative farming, particularly co-ploughing, based on contracts agreed between small farmers with too few oxen to set up a full ploughing team. Given that archaeology seems to indicate that the average late prehistoric farm in much of temperate Europe had about 5–10 cattle, of which at the most 2–3 would have been oxen, and that Pliny reports that teams of up to 8 oxen were used on the heavier soils of the Gallia Cisalpina (with possibly even larger teams required for more northerly areas with even heavier soils), it seems highly likely that similar regulations for cooperative farming practices were also common in many late Prehistoric Celtic laws. Reconstructable as Celt. *komarom, 'joint ploughing', it is one of the areas where early law may have even penetrated to within the internal processes of the individual kin-group, particularly where some members of a ploughing cooperative were not kinsmen, while others were: as formal contracts would have been required between all members of the cooperative, they would also have bound members of the same kin in formal contracts.

Another important field where contracts most likely were of high significance is in the establishment of long-standing or even semi-permanent social relationships between clearly socially superior and inferior parties, particularly clientele contracts. The similarity between the Irish and Gaulish way to establish noble rank has already been remarked upon above. Comparable similarities seem also to have existed in the mutual responsibilities between noble patron and client. The significance of contractual relations in late prehistoric Celtic laws is also given away by an episode in Caesar's account of the Gaulish Wars, in his description of how Dumnorix, an Aeduan noble, had acquired his vast wealth: "for a great many years he has been in the habit of contracting for the customs and all the other taxes of the Aedui at a small cost, because when he bids, no one dares to bid against him". Even the relationship between nobles and the state was based on contracts in late Gaulish polities, contracts no doubt constructed based on a more general model between lords and their clients: access to property or resources in return for rent.

==== Crime and punishment ====
Evidence for what constituted criminal offences, and what was considered the appropriate punishment for them, is mostly lacking for late prehistoric Celtic laws. What little there is to be found, again mostly in Caesar's account of the Gaulish wars, seems again to fit reasonably well with what we could reconstruct as 'general principles' from early medieval Irish and Welsh law. Crimes mentioned in Caesar's account are murder, theft and robbery, as well as crimes specific to only some Gaulish societies, e.g. usurpation of kingship amongst the Helvetii. The punishment considered most severe amongst the Gauls, according to Caesar, is to ban criminals from religious rites, which probably is better understood as outlawing them. He does, however, also mention the death penalty, presumably of outlaws, not as a regular form of punishment. The common form of punishment, however, seems to have been the imposition of fines. That Caesar mentions both praemia poenasque, "premiums and fines" may indicate that a system with two separate kinds of fines, comparable to the body-fine/restitution and honour-price in early Irish and Welsh law, already existed in late prehistoric Celtic laws. As fines and outlawing are the preferred forms of punishment not only in the early medieval Irish and Welsh laws, but also in the early Germanic laws, it seems quite reasonable to assume that the same applied for most of the late prehistoric Celtic laws.

==== Procedure ====
Much as with crime and punishment, we have only little direct evidence from later prehistory where legal procedure is concerned. Caesar claims that the druids are the judges for all kinds of legal disputes, both where criminal and where civil law is concerned. Where the latter is concerned, the examples Caesar mentions are quarrels over inheritance and boundaries, indicating that such conflicts were seen as particularly important by his sources. That druids were moral philosophers is also known from other historical sources such as Strabo, which may indicate that at least part of the druids was trained as professional lawyers.

While we have no direct evidence for that, it is highly likely that legal proceedings only started if there was a plaintiff, either the injured party or a representative, the latter almost certainly a kinsmen of the injured party. Proceedings probably will have been started by a complaint to whoever was seen responsible to uphold justice, which might have been a druid, in some late Gaulish policies an official, or perhaps a noble patron of either the injured party or the offender, or possibly the offender himself had to be approached. It is most likely that if the offender did not submit willingly to settle the dispute in court, he could be distrained by the plaintiff. While we have no direct evidence for the latter, it seems quite likely, given that the practice is well attested in early medieval Irish and Welsh law with cognate terminology, but also in the early Germanic laws, and even in early Roman law.

What little evidence we have (almost exclusively a few lines in Caesar's De Bello Gallico) would seem to indicate that a day would be appointed for the pleading, probably with pledges given or sureties named that the defendant would actually show, and both plaintiff and defendant would swear an oath that their respective claim or account of events was a truthful representation of what had occurred. Most likely, they could be supported by similar oaths sworn by their kinsmen, retainers, clients or whoever wanted to support them, as character-witnesses for the original plaintiff or defendant, quite comparable to the procedure in early medieval Irish, Welsh and Germanic laws. Given that at least some contracts most likely were entered into in front of witnesses and secured by sureties, it is also likely that these may have been called up to give testimony, also supporting their accounts by similar oaths.

We are lacking direct evidence as to what happened once a judgement had been found, and whether there were any appeals procedures possible, but most likely the party who had been convicted would have been expected to pay, by a certain date, any fines or premiums awarded to the victorious party. Any other form of punishment would probably be executed as well, if direct punishment possibly even right on the spot. If any fines or premiums awarded were not paid, it again is quite likely that the successful claimant then gained the right to distrain the convicted party and thereby recover a value equivalent to the unpaid fines or premiums.

==== Foreigners and the law ====
We have no direct evidence for how early Celtic laws treated foreigners for most of the late prehistoric Celtic world. However, the already mentioned tesserae hospitales from Celtiberia, as well as the common practice in early European legal systems to consider, in principle, foreigners without a local host as without legal protection, we can assume that the same was the case in most if not all late prehistoric Celtic laws. While foreigners without local kin or a local host would thus have been 'fair game', it is likely that at least some members of late prehistoric Celtic polities were able to grant legal protection to foreigners (guests). This again would correspond well with the situation in early medieval Irish and Welsh law, where again cognate terminology exists for parallel practices of granting hospitality to foreigners. There is, of course, no evidence who actually could grant such hospitality, but it seems, if we go by the tesserae hospitales, that at least in Celtiberia this practice was not necessarily limited to ruling kin in larger polities, but was available at a relatively local level, which might indicate that, much like in early medieval Ireland and Wales, many members of any given polity were able to grant hospitality.

== The evolution of the Celtic laws ==
Law is not static; it changes constantly to suit the needs of the society which it regulates. However, this does not necessarily mean that the principles on which these laws are based change at the same speed. Where the Celtic laws are concerned, it seems as if the guiding legal principles remained quite similar over an extended period, from late prehistory into the Middle Ages. Of course, this does not imply complete co-identity of legal systems between the communities of late prehistoric Gaul and those of early medieval Ireland. Rather, it is a result of similar social, political and economic requirements of the societies governed by these laws, which seem to have been sufficiently similar across this rather large area in both space and time that made fundamental changes to the legal principles unnecessary.

The focus on certain elements of the law, like those dealing with kin-group relations and contracts, makes it likely that these principles evolved out of the needs of still primarily kinship-based societies. They seem to have remained reasonably useful even into times when primarily kinship-based forms of social organisation had been replaced with somewhat more territoriality-based ones, in which kinship nonetheless remained a very important structuring factor in society.

While we cannot date or place the origin of the various principles that make up Celtic laws in later prehistory (some of them probably of great antiquity even when they became part of Celtic laws, others perhaps developed as late as the Iron Age), once we find them expressed in Celtic legal terminology, we can reasonably call them 'Celtic laws'. This development of a Celtic legal terminology seems to have taken place some time in later prehistory, with the conventional date given as roughly 1000 BC, even though this may be several centuries off.

While based on generally similar principles, legal evolution took place locally or at the most regionally, to suit the requirements of any given society. Interaction between these different societies then must have resulted in useful innovations being adopted and adapted for their own respective needs by many societies, and less useful practices being abandoned as a result. It thus is quite likely that both the early medieval Irish and Welsh laws, the two that have survived for posterity in sufficient detail to be reasonable interpretable, are local developments, having originated where they are documented, but constantly subject to outside influence and internal innovation, and thus not particularly dissimilar to other laws practised in their vicinity at the time they were recorded.

== Bibliography ==
- Baitinger, H. & Pinsker, B. 2002. Das Rätsel der Kelten vom Glauberg. Glaube – Mythos – Wirklichkeit. Stuttgart: Theiss.
- Benveniste, É. 1969. Le vocabulaire des institutions indo-européennes. 1. économie, parenté, société. 2. pouvoir, droit, religion. Paris: Editions de Minuit.
- Binchy, D. A. 1972. "Celtic Suretyship, a fossilized Indo-European Institution?" The Irish Jurist 7, 360–72.
- – 1973. "Distraint in Irish Law." Celtica 10, 22–71.
- Burmeister, S. 2000. Geschlecht, Alter und Herrschaft in der Späthallstattzeit Württembergs. Tübinger Schriften zur ur- und frühgeschichtlichen Archäologie 4, Münster: Waxmann.
- Charles-Edwards, Th. 1980. "Nau Kynwedi Teithiauc." In D. Jenkins and M.E. Owen (eds.), The Welsh Law of Women. Studies presented to Professor Daniel A. Binchy on his eightieth birthday, 3 June 1980. Cardiff: University of Wales Press, 23–39.
- – 1993. Early Irish and Welsh Kinship. Oxford: Clarendon.
- Cornell, T.J. 1995. The Beginnings of Rome. Italy and Rome from the Bronze Age to the Punic Wars (c. 1000–264 BC). Routledge History of the Ancient World, London & New York: Routledge.
- Cunliffe, Barry W. 2005. Iron Age Communities in Britain. 4th edition, London & New York: Routledge.
- Delamarre, X. 2003. Dictionnaire de la langue gauloise. Une approche linguistique du vieux-celtique continental. 2e édition revue et augmentée. Paris : éditions errance.
- Dillon, M. & Chadwick, N.K. 1967. The Celtic Realms. London: Weidenfeld & Nicolson.
- Dobesch, G. 1980. Die Kelten in Österreich nach den ältesten Berichten der Antike. Das norische Königreich und seine Beziehungen zu Rom im 2. Jahrhundert v. Chr. Wien & Graz: Böhlau.
- Jenkins, D. 1982. Agricultural Co-operation in Welsh Medieval Law. St. Fagans: Amgueddfa Werin Cymru.
- – 1990 (trans.). The Law of Hywel Dda. Law Texts from Medieval Wales. The Welsh Classics vol. 2, Gomer: Gomer Press.
- Johnston, D. 1999. Roman Law in Context. Key Themes in Ancient History. Cambridge: Cambridge University Press.
- Karl, R. 1996. Latènezeitliche Siedlungen in Niederösterreich. Historica Austria Bd. 2&3, Wien: ÖAB.
- – 2005a. Society and Law in Continental Celtic Europe. In H. Birkhan (ed.), Bausteine zum Studium der Keltologie. Wien: Edition Präsens, 383–9.
- – 2005b. Master and apprentice, knight and squire. Oxford Journal of Archaeology 24 (3), 255–71.
- – 2006. Altkeltische Sozialstrukturen. Archaeolingua 18, Innsbruck & Budapest: Archaeolingua.
- – forthcoming. Kurz- und langfristige Geschäfte. Grundlagen alteuropäischen Vertragsrechts. In M. Schönfelder, H. Stäuble & F. Falkenstein (eds.), Langfristige Erscheinungen und Brüche von der Bronze- zur Eisenzeit. Akten der gemeinsamen Sitzung der AG Bronzezeit und AG Eisenzeit am 5. Deutschen Archäologenkongress, Frankfurt/Oder 2005. Weißbach: Beier & Beran.
- Kelly, Fergus (1988). A Guide to Early Irish Law. Early Irish Law Series 3. Dublin: DIAS. ISBN 0901282952.
- – 1995. Early Irish Farming. Early Irish Law Series Vol.IV, Dublin: DIAS.
- Krauße, D. 1998. Infantizid. Theoriegeleitete Überlegungen zu den Eltern-Kind-Beziehungen in ur- und frühgeschichtlicher und antiker Zeit. In A. Müller-Karpe, H. Brandt, H. Jöns, D. Krauße, A. Wigg (eds.), Studien zur Archäologie der Kelten, Römer und Germanen in Mittel- und Westeuropa. Festschrift A. Haffner. Internationale Archäologie, Studia honoraria 4, Rahden/Westfalen: Verlag Marie Leidorf, 313–52.
- Kristiansen, K. 1998. Europe Before History. New Studies in Archaeology, Cambridge: Cambridge University Press.
- Lupoi, M. 2000. The origins of the European legal order. Cambridge: Cambridge University Press.
- MacNeill, E. 1923. "Ancient Irish Law: the Law of Status or Franchise." Proceedings of the Royal Irish Academy 36 C, 265–316.
- Meid, W. 1993. Die erste Botorrita-Inschrift. Interpretation eines keltiberischen Sprachdenkmals. Innsbrucker Beiträge zur Sprachwissenschaft 76, Innsbruck: Institut für Sprachwissenschaft der Universität Innsbruck.
- Mitteis, H. & Lieberich, H. 1992. Deutsche Rechtsgeschichte. 19th ed., München: C.H. Beck.
- Parkes, P. 2006. "Celtic Fosterage: Adoptive Kinship and Clientage in Northwest Europe." Comparative Studies in Society and History 48, 359–95.
- Pryce, H. 1986. "Duw yn Lle Mach: Briduw yng Nghyfraith Hywel." In Th. Charles-Edwards, M.E. Owen & D.B. Walters (eds.), Lawyers and Laymen. Studies in the History of Law presented to Professor Dafydd Jenkins on his seventy-fifth birthday, Gwyl Ddewi 1986. Cardiff: University of Wales Press, 47–71.
- Peške, L. 1984. "Analyse der Tierknochen." Památky Archeologické 75, 201.
- – 1993. "Osteological analysis of the material from Radovesice (23): Animal husbandry in the La Tène period." In J. Waldhauser (ed.), Die hallstatt- und latènezeitliche Siedlung mit Gräberfeld bei Radovesice in Böhmen. II. Band. Archeologický výzkum v severních Čechách 21, Praha: CSAV, 156–72.
- Pucher, E. 1998. "Der Knochenabfall einer späthallstatt-/latènezeitlichen Siedlung bei Inzersdorf ob der Traisen (Niederösterreich)." In P.C. Ramsl (ed.), Inzersdorf-Walpersdorf. Studien zur späthallstatt-/latènezeitlichen Besiedlung im Traisental, Niederösterreich. Fundberichte aus Österreich Materialheft A6, Wien: Bundesdenkmalamt, 56–67.
- Rieckhoff, S. & Biel, J. 2001. Die Kelten in Deutschland. Stuttgart: Theiss.
- Sánchez-Moreno, E. 2001. "Cross-cultural links in ancient Iberia: socio-economic anatomy of hospitality." Oxford Journal of Archaeology 20 (4), 391–414.
- Spindler, K. 1976. Der Magdalenenberg bei Villingen. Stuttgart: Theiss.
- Stacey, R.Ch. 1986a. "The Archaic Core of Llyfr Iorwerth." In Th. Charles-Edwards, M.E. Owen & D.B. Walters (eds.), Lawyers and Laymen. Studies in the History of Law presented to Professor Dafydd Jenkins on his seventy-fifth birthday, Gwyl Ddewi 1986. Cardiff: University of Wales Press, 15–46.
- – 1986b. "Berrad Airechta: an Old Irish Tract on Suretyship." In Th. Charles-Edwards, M.E. Owen & D.B. Walters (eds.), Lawyers and Laymen. Studies in the History of Law presented to Professor Dafydd Jenkins on his seventy-fifth birthday, Gwyl Ddewi 1986. Cardiff: University of Wales Press, 210–33.
- – 1990. "Ties That Bind: Immunities in Irish and Welsh Law." Cambridge Medieval Celtic Studies 20, 39–60.
- Stifter, David. 2001. "Neues vom Keltiberischen: Notizen zu Botorrita IV." Die Sprache 38/3, 1996 [2001] = Chronicalia Indoeuropaea 38, 91–112.
- Vendryes, J. 1959: Lexique étymologique de l'irlandais ancien. A. Dublin – Paris: DIAS.
- – 1974. Lexique étymologique de l'irlandais ancien. RS. Dublin – Paris : DIAS.
- Villar, F., Díaz Sanz, M.A., Medrano Margués, M.M. & Jordán Cólera, C. 2001. El IV Bronce de Botorrita (Contrebia Belaisca): Arqueología y Linguística. Acta salmanticensia, Estudios Filológicos 286, Salamanca.
- Walters, D.B. 1986. "The General Features of Archaic European Suretyship." In Th. Charles-Edwards, M.E. Owen & D.B. Walters (eds.), Lawyers and Laymen. Studies in the History of Law presented to Professor Dafydd Jenkins on his seventy-fifth birthday, Gwyl Ddewi 1986. Cardiff: University of Wales Press, 92–116.
- Wenskus, R. 1961. Stammesbildung und Verfassung. Das Werden der frühmittelalterlichen Gentes. Köln & Graz: Böhlau.
