= Bechbretha =

Old Irish legal text on beekeeping

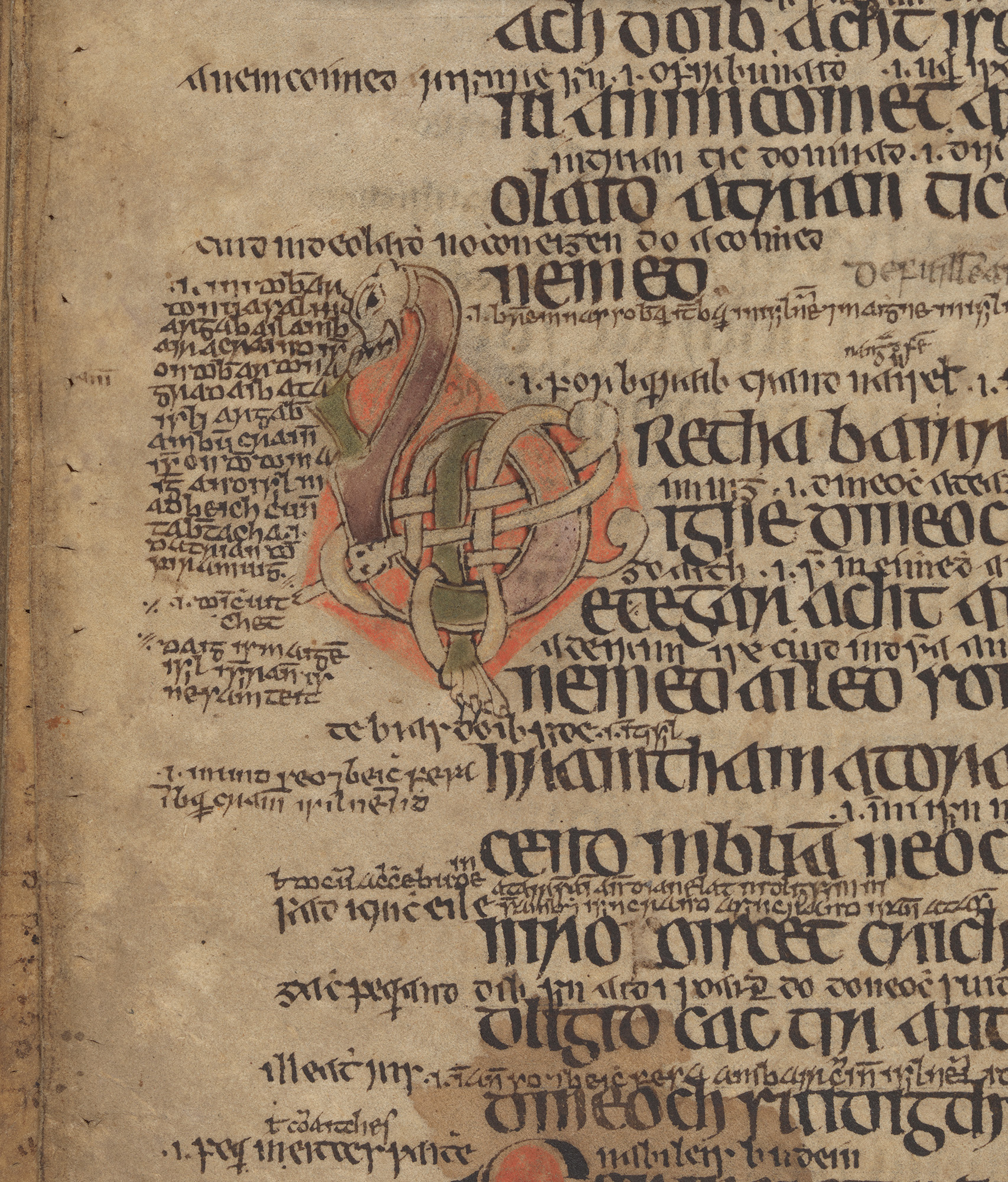
The decorated initial B begins the Bechbretha in a 14th-century manuscript (Trinity College, MS 1316).

The Bechbretha (Note: Old Irish pronunciation: [ˈbʲexβʲɾʲeθa]) (Old Irish for "Bee-judgements") is an early Irish legal text on the law of beekeeping. It has been dated to the middle of the 7th century CE. The author of Bechbretha may also have been the author of two other early Irish legal tracts, Coibes Uisci Thairdne and Bretha im Fhuillema Gell.

It is the 21st text in the Senchas Már.

== Manuscripts ==
The text of Bechbretha is only preserved in a complete form in one manuscript (Dublin, Trinity College, MS 1387). Five authors (writing between the 14th and 16th century) contributed glosses to this copy of the Bechbretha. Ten other manuscripts (including British Library, MS Egerton 88) and O'Davoren's Glossary offer fragments of or quotations from the Bechbretha of varying length. It was edited (with translation) as part of the Ancient Laws of Ireland (Vol. 4, 1901). In 1983 it was re-edited with a new translation and commentary by Thomas Charles-Edwards and Fergus Kelly.

== Author ==
D. A. Binchy proposed that the Irish legal texts Bechbretha and Coibes Uisci Thairdne ("Kinship of conducted water", a tract on watermills) were by the same author. These texts have shared stylistic features (most notably, an ornamented prose style) and a common legal outlook. Charles-Edwards and Kelly agree with Binchy in this hypothesis; they further propose that Bretha im Fhuillema Gell ("Judgements concerning pledge-interests") originated from the same school as the author of the Bechbretha.

Charles-Edwards and Kelly propose that the author of Bechbretha was not a cleric but a legal professional, writing a "professional tract designed to instruct actual or prospective judges". Kim McCone disagrees, pointing out that clerics were sometimes judges in early Ireland, so that this cannot rule out clerical authorship. McCone argues that the subject of bee-keeping would be especially appropriate for a clerical setting, as monasteries possessed special beekeeping rights.

== Contents ==
Bechbretha describes the law of beekeeping in early medieval Ireland. It is the 21st text of the collection of legal texts called the Senchas Már, placed in the middle third of that collection. Bees were an important part of the agricultural economy of medieval Ireland. Irish tradition attributes the introduction of beekeeping to Saint Modomnóc in the early 7th century. However the presence of some Common Celtic technical terms to do with beekeeping in Irish suggest that beekeeping in Ireland predates this.

Charles-Edwards and Kelly divide the tract into five sections: a section on the relations between a keeper of a hive and his neighbours (§§1-26); a section on injuries to persons caused by bees (§§27-35); a section on the ownership of swarms (§§36-49); and a section on the theft of bees (§§50-54); ending with a colophon (§55). The author of the Bechbretha attempts to justify the rules he presents by analogy with better-known laws. Questions about the swarming of hives onto others' land, which he tries hard to fit into the existing law of animal trespass, concern him much more than injuries to persons by bees.

In §31, Bechbretha gives the judgement against the keeper of a bee that blinded the Ulster king Congal Cáech: one hive awarded to the king. Early Irish law very rarely gives cases involving genuine historical personages (preferring to invoke mythical or Biblical stories). Therefore, this case, involving the historical king Congal Cáech, is quite unique. However, the legal case itself is probably mythical, given the unlikely facts and lenient verdict. Bechbretha §12-16 may preserve some information from the lost Irish legal work Fidbretha (tree-judgements).

Kelly has suggested that the early Irish law of beekeeping presented in Bechbretha is of pre-Christian origin, as it has parallels with Welsh treatments of the same topic, and borrows little from Latin sources. Brian D. Joseph has gone further to parallel some features bee-law of Bechbretha with the Hittite Laws and Code of Lekë Dukagjini, suggesting an Indo-European origin.

== Date ==
Charles-Edwards and Kelly have dated the Bechbretha to the middle of the 7th century CE on the basis of its language, though McCone has expressed scepticism about the validity of this dating method. A terminus post quem is established by the reference to Congal Cáech (who reigned from 626 to 637 CE). The compilation of various Irish law tracts into the Senchas Már, which is thought to have occurred later than their individual composition, is generally dated between the late 7th and early 8th century CE.

== See also ==
- Muirbretha (Sea-judgements) on early Irish maritime law
