= Di Astud Chor =

Di Astud Chor ("On the Securing of Contracts"; astud is the infinitive of the verb ad•suidi 'holds fast, binds') is an Old Irish legal tract on contracts. It treats the various circumstances that determine when contracts are binding on a party and when they are not. Its existence was first brought to the attention of modern scholarship by Neil McLeod, whose edition (with translation and notes) appeared in 1992. The tract is a collection of material from varying dates, some no earlier than the 8th century, some much earlier. For instance, it contains a poem on contractual surplus adjustment that can be dated, based on style, to the early 7th century.

Four versions were distinguished by McLeod, A (Corpus Iuris Hibernici 985.24–1002.31), B (CIH 1348.21–1359.25), C (CIH 2040.28–2045.36, 2046.34–2050.32), and D (1962.28–1963.35). McLeod divided it into 60 paragraphs of text in two distinct sections. Part one (paragraphs 1–36) concerns the general rules determining contracts to be binding, whereas part two (paragraphs 37–60) concerns exceptional cases, particularly cases where previously undisclosed defects exist, that allow a contract to be abandoned.

== See also ==
- Early Irish law
