= Berrad Airechta =

Early Irish legal tract on contract law

Berrad Airechta (Old Irish for "The shaving of the court" or, less literally, "Synopsis of court procedure") is an early Irish legal tract dealing with contracts and suretyship.

== Manuscripts and editions ==
There is one surviving copy of Berrad Airechta (Trinity College MS 1337). Only two later commentaries refer to it, both without quotes. It seems that the surviving copy is not complete; both commentaries refer to portions of Berrad Airechta which we cannot identify, and the introduction (Atait dano rūidlesa tuaithe a Féniu, "There are, moreover, transactions of the people of a kingdom which are totally immune from claim in Irish law") implies there was some text preceding it.

Kuno Meyer (1921) edited the first half of the surviving text and Rudolf Thurneysen (1928) edited the second half. Thurneysen (1928) also gave a translation into German. Robin Stacey (1994) translated the text into English based on Thurneysen's translation.

== Contents ==
Berrad Airechta deals with the Irish institution of suretyship. In early Irish society, the state was not entrusted with enforcing contracts; instead, each party in a contract recruited a number of sureties, i.e., people on the line for the enforcement of the contract. The procedures for enforcing a contract were sophisticated, but taxing for both parties and for their sureties. Berrad Airechta is the most detailed account of contracts in the Old Irish corpus.

The surviving portion of Berrad Airechta was divided into 84 sections by Thurneysen. Stacey delineates five sections: first, defining contractual agreements; second, dealing with a kind of surety called the naidm (or "enforcing" surety); third, how contracts bind parties; fourth, the necessary witnesses to contracts; fifth, to the sureties known as aitire and rath ("paying" and "hostage" sureties). The section on witnesses carries the title Córus fiadnuise ("Regulation of evidence").

According to Stacey, Berrad Airechta is "unquestionably a composite text" with multiple linguistic layers (the latest of which corresponds to 700 CE). Stacey argues the text was reworked from multiple sources to form a tract with a structure that mirrored the usual procedural schedule of a contract case (using etymological digressions to smooth the transitions between different material). Michael A. O'Brien suggested Berrad Airechta was a kind of handbook for working judges.

The Old Irish word berrad in the title is translated literally as "shearing" or "shaving" by Thurneysen and Stacey. O'Brien and Fergus Kelly have argued that the berrad should associated with the meaning "synopsis" or "summary".
