= Bretha Crólige =

Early Irish legal text on illegal injury

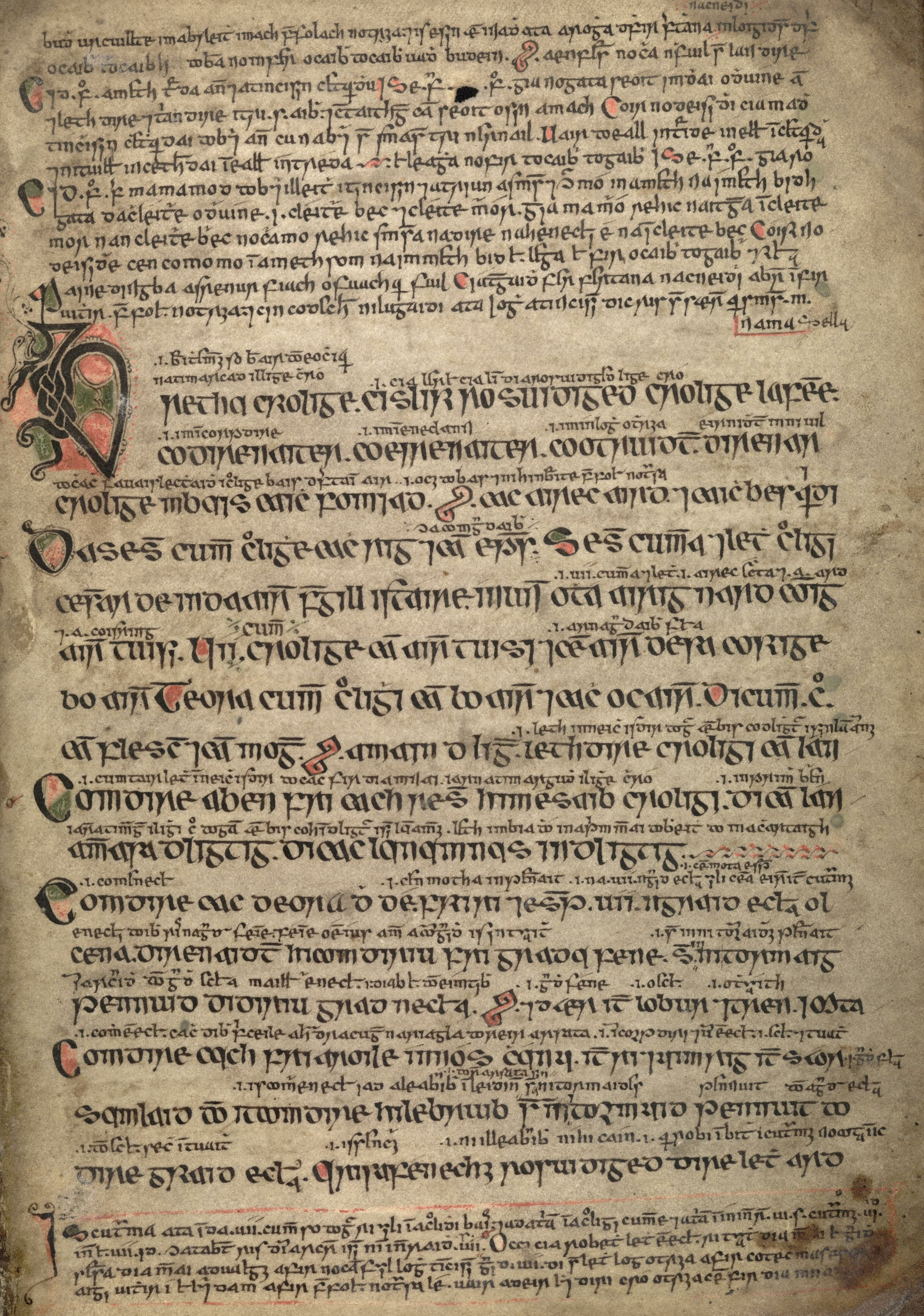
The beginning of Bretha Crólige (National Library of Ireland MS G 11, p. 441)

Bretha Crólige (Old Irish for "Judgements on Blood-lyings") is an early Irish legal tract on the law of illegal injury and the institution of "sick-maintenance".

It is the 33rd text in the Senchas Már. It directly precedes Bretha Déin Chécht, a sister-tract on illegal injury.

== Manuscripts ==
A single manuscript preserves Bretha Crólige (National Library of Ireland MS G 11), alongside three other texts from the final third of the Senchas Már. D. A. Binchy produced an edition of this copy, with translation and commentary, in 1938. Binchy calls this manuscript a "remarkably good copy". Other manuscripts contain fragments of the text or commentaries on it.

On the basis of some internal inconsistencies, Rudolf Thurneysen suggested the existing text of Bretha Crólige was the composite of two separate texts. Binchy rejected this hypothesis.

== Contents ==
Bretha Crólige deals with the law of illegal injury and the institution of "sick-maintenance" in early Irish law. After a party has been illegally injured, they are given nine days to recover. After these nine days, if the injured has recovered but has a lasting disability, the culprit pays for the disability; if the injured will not recover, the culprit pays a large fine called the crólige báis ("blood-lying of death"); if the injured will recover but has not yet, the culprit is forced to pay "sick-maintenance" (othrus). In "sick-maintenance", the injured is taken to a neutral party and nursed back to health, with all expenses paid by the culprit. For any injury or disability, the size of the fine taken from the culprit depended on the status of the injured.

Bretha Crólige is the 33rd text of the collection of legal texts called the Senchas Már, placed in the final third of that collection. The compilation of the Senchas Már is generally dated between the late 7th and early 8th century CE. The Senchas Már has two tracts dedicated to sick-maintenance: one is Bretha Crólige; the other is Slicht Othrusa ("The Course of Sick-Maintenance"), a text of only 35 words which directly precedes Bretha Crólige in the Senchas Már. A sister-tract on illegal injury, Bretha Déin Chécht, directly follows it.

The problem of the date at which sick-maintenance ceased to be applied is an open question. The early 8th-century text Críth Gablach tells us that sick-maintenance had ceased to be taken; yet the contemporary Bretha Crólige describes this law as if it were a live institution. As Fergus Kelly puts it, this discrepancy may "betray a difference of date, [...] reflect differences in local custom, or merely [reflect] a conflict of opinion between law-schools".

Binchy suggested that sick-maintenance was a feature of Indo-European law on the basis of comparison with Indian and Germanic laws. His suggestion was elaborated by Calvert Watkins through comparisons with the Hittite laws. Lisi Oliver has argued that the institution of sick-maintenance in Anglo-Saxon law was borrowed from Irish law (rather than the two institutions sharing a common Indo-European heritage).

Beyond their value as a source for early Irish law, Bretha Crólige and Bretha Déin Chécht reveal much about the extent of medical knowledge and the kinds of treatment available in the period. The other available medical manuscripts reproduce medicine of a much later date (mostly borrowed from Arabic sources).
