= Muirbretha =

Early Irish legal text on maritime law

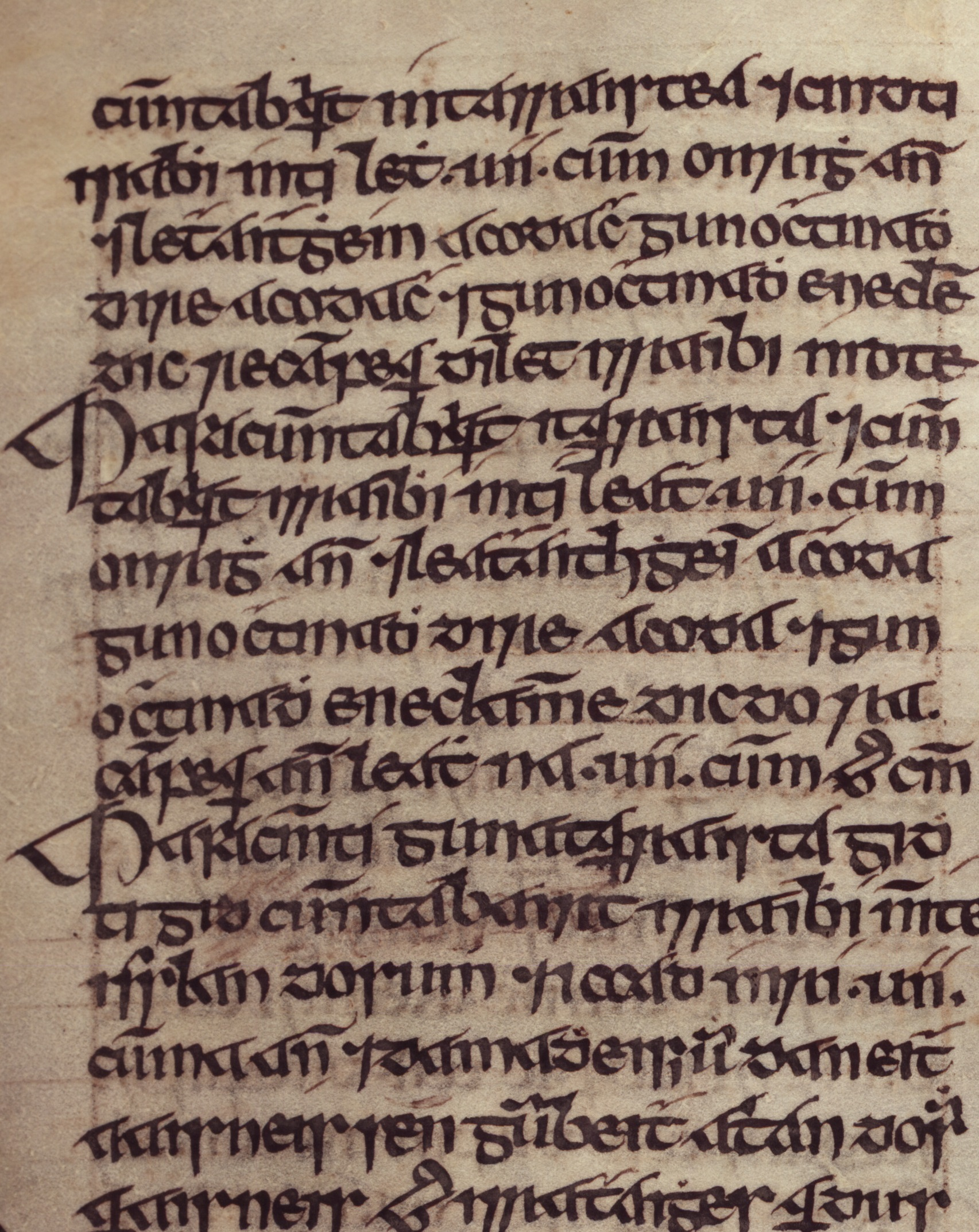
Three excerpts from Muirbretha on the duty to reports shipwrecks (Bodleian Library MS Rawl B 506, fol 41r).

Muirbretha (Old Irish for "Sea-judgements") is a fragmentarily preserved early Irish legal text dealing with maritime law, especially the law of shipwrecks.

It is the 38th text in the Senchas Már.

== Manuscripts ==
Muirbretha is preserved only in fragments. Charlene Eska lists five manuscript sources (given sigla A–E; mostly from collections of unattributed legal excerpts, but including C, an excerpt from Bretha Éitgid) as well as a number of quotations from O'Davoren's Glossary. These fragments are accompanied by glosses and commentaries, which help us understand more about the nature of early Irish maritime law.

The title Muirbretha for this tract is given in Cormac's Glossary and Cethairṡlicht Athgabálae.

== Contents ==
Muirbretha is our main source for early Irish maritime law. It is the 38th text of the collection of legal texts called the Senchas Már, placed in the final third of that collection. The compilation of the Senchas Már is generally dated between the late 7th and early 8th century CE.

The manuscript fragments of the Muirbretha deal with the duty to report shipwrecks (A); the sources of revenue from the king's coastal lands (B); the law of property lost through shipwrecks, including the various percentages of the property's value due to the finder, to the original owner, and to various other parties, depending on the situation (C, D, and E). The surviving portions of the Muirbretha deal entirely with maritime law as it relates to land. No fragment deals with the law governing the relations between merchants and shippers, or the law on board ships. The amount of attention paid to the law of shipwrecks reflects the considerable risk involved in shipping in early Ireland. Fergus Kelly suggests that a section on fishing rights in estuaries was among the portions of the Muirbretha lost, as the existence of a discussion of these rights is mentioned in another early Irish text.

Eska has studied the maritime law described here, and especially the law of property lost through shipwrecks. She argues it is "remarkably similar" to that found in medieval Cornish, Welsh, and English legal sources. Jonathan M. Wooding has utilised the "considerable detail on the possible contents of cargoes" contained in the Muirbretha to study the nature of Continental―Irish commerce in the 6th and 7th centuries.
