= Cóic Conara Fugill =

Early Irish legal text on court procedure

Cóic Conara Fugill (Old Irish for "Five paths to judgement") is a short early Irish legal tract dealing with court procedure. It was composed in the 8th or 9th century, and is the only early Irish legal tract to describe how a litigant could put his case before a judge, though the system described in it seems to have no longer been in force by the 10th or 11th century CE.

== Manuscripts ==
The complete text of Cóic Conara Fugill is preserved in several manuscripts. There are five copies of it in the Corpus Iuris Hibernici alone. Rudolf Thurneysen (1925) published an edition of this text with commentary and German translation. Thurneysen (1933) later published a supplement to this, with the text of a manuscript of Cóic Conara Fugill that had subsequently come to light (within a text of Uraicecht Becc). Thurneysen distinguished two recensions of the text: RE and H. RE is the earlier recension; its text comes from two manuscripts, R and E, of which R has fewer errors of transmission.

The title is taken from the incipit.

== Contents ==
Cóic Conara Fugill is a short and difficult text, but is the only early Irish law tract to deal with how a litigant could put his case before a judge. Only limited information about court procedure is available from other law tracts (for example, Airecht-text, a short text which informs us where people were sat in a court-room). The titular five paths are procedures for pleading before a judge; each case demands a particular path and the legal advocate could be fined if he chose the wrong one. In the earlier, RE recension, these five paths are named fír ('truth'), dliged ('entitlement'), cert ('justice'), téchtae ('propriety') and coir n-athchomairc ('proper enquiry').

The fír path seems to have been unified by the presence of a legal ordeal, and was proper to perjury, estate division, and especially difficult cases; the distinction between the dliged and cert paths is not clear, but both seem to have both been proper to contractual cases; the téchtae path was proper to cases involving slaves (though whether only cases involving a slave's servile status, or more generally any case against a slave, it is not clear); the coir n-athchomairc path was perhaps a catch-all path, for those cases that did not fit into the previous four. The later, H recension places the five paths in an account of the "eight stages" of a legal case: (1) a date for the hearing is set; (2) the "path" to be taken is chosen; (3) both parties give security, to bind them to the judgement; (4) both parties plead their case; (5) both parties rebut the other's arguments; (6) judgement is made; (7) judgement is publicly declared; (8) the conclusion (a presumably formal stage, of which we know little).

Cóic Conara Fugill was composed around the 7th or 8th century. The earliest recension of Cóic Conara Fugill is written mainly in the Fenechas style, an early style of Irish legal writing characterised by archaic metre and crabbed, allusive prose. T. M. Charles Edwards suggests works in such a style originated as oral compositions. Johan Corthals suggests some aspects of the "five paths" show borrowings from ancient rhetorical theory. Thurneysen's study concluded that the system described in Cóic Conara Fugill was a "dead text" by the 10th or 11th centuries on the basis of later jurists' treatment of it.

D. A. Binchy suggested that the older recension of Cóic Conara Fugill (alongside the legal tracts Uraicecht Becc, Bretha Étgid, and the first and second Bretha Nemed) was the work of a hypothesised Nemed school, perhaps located in Munster. Binchy suggested that there was a pagan element in the writings of this school; this contention has come under criticism from Donnchadh Ó Corráin, Liam Breatnach and Aidan Breen.
