= CIH =

CIH or cih may refer to:

- CIH (computer virus), also known as Chernobyl and Spacefiller
- CIH Bank, a wholly owned subsidiary of the Moroccan Caisse de dépôt et de gestion
- Capricorn Investment Holdings, a southern African umbrella for the Capricorn group of companies
- Certified Industrial Hygienist, professional credential for occupational hygienists in the United States
- IATA code for Changzhi Wangcun Airport
- The Chartered Institute of Housing, a UK-based professional society
- ISO 639-3 code for the Chinali language
- Opel cam-in-head engine, a series of vehicle engines
- Chromogenic immunohistochemistry
- Corpus Iuris Hibernici, compilation of sources for early Irish law
- Cih, a name for the star Gamma Cassiopeiae, also written Tsih or Cè
