= Uraicecht Becc =

Uraicecht Becc (Old Irish for "Small Primer"; uraicecht is a variant of airaiccecht [air- 'before' + aiccecht 'instruction,' from Latin acceptum], 'primer') is an Old Irish legal tract on status. Of all status tracts, it has the greatest breadth in coverage, including not only commoners, kings, churchmen and poets, but also a variety of other professional groups, including judges. However, it does not go into as much detail for each group and level as do other status tracts. T.M. Charles-Edwards suggests that it is "almost certainly of Munster origin", as it asserts the supremacy of the king of Munster above other Irish kings and makes reference to the monasteries of Emly and Cork.

== Contents ==
The Small Primer goes into detail regarding the poets' place in Irish society. It lists the seven grades of poets, including their honor price, and the pay earned for the various meters they could perform.

D.A. Binchy suggested that Uraicecht Becc (alongside the legal tracts Bretha Étgid, Cóic Conara Fugill, and the first and second Bretha Nemed) was the work of a hypothesised Nemed school, perhaps located in Munster. Binchy suggested that there was a strong pagan element in the writings of this school; this contention has come under criticism from Donnchadh Ó Corráin, Liam Breatnach and Aidan Breen.

== Edition ==
- D.A. Binchy, Corpus Iuris Hibernici: 1590–1618; 634–655; 2318–2335; & 2255–2282.

== See also ==
- Early Irish law
