= Cethairṡlicht Athgabálae =

Early Irish legal text on distraint

Cethairṡlicht Athgabálae or Di Chetharṡlicht Athgabálae (Old Irish for "The four paths of distraint") is an early Irish legal tract dealing with distraint, i.e., the seizure of property in order to receive money owed.

It is the 2nd text of the Senchas Már.

== Manuscripts ==
Two manuscripts give a continuous copy of Cethairṡlicht Athgabálae (British Library MS Harley 432 and Trinity College MS 1336) however both break off before the end. Various other manuscripts preserve quotes alongside later glosses and commentary.

== Contents ==
Cethairṡlicht Athgabálae is the 2nd text of the collection of legal texts called the Senchas Már, coming directly after the introduction. It is placed in the first third of that collection. The compilation of the Senchas Már is generally dated between the late 7th and early 8th century CE.

Cethairṡlicht Athgabálae deals with distraint (athgabál in Old Irish). The early Irish legal system had an unusually robust system of distraint, which the English suppressed by legislation after their invasion of Ireland. D. A. Binchy has argued that the Irish system of distraint preserved a transitional phase between "primitive unrestricted seizure" (i.e., seizing of property without legal procedure) and the limited and state-controlled distraint of later legal systems (such as is present in English common law). Cethairṡlicht Athgabálae is unique among the early Irish law texts in that it does not limit distraint to seizure of livestock, but allows seizure of land, persons, and nonlivestock property. Nonetheless, there are restrictions on distraint, such as a delay if the debtor is engaged in some urgent matter. Given these restrictions, Cethairṡlicht Athgabálae recommends that the person intending to distrain should employ a lawyer (whose fee would be a third of the property distrained).

The formal procedure of distraint is laid out in Cethairṡlicht Athgabálae: a formal notice, a period of delay to let the indebted party repay their debt, the progressive forfeiture of property. Cethairṡlicht Athgabálae is concerned with the proper kinds of distraint to be enforced on particular categories of person. For example, among professionals, their tools are made useless until the creditor has seized sufficient property, and among dependent persons of little property (such as slaves), Cethairṡlicht Athgabálae allows the creditor to limit that person's movement and diet until their master pays the debt.

According to Robin Stacey, Cethairṡlicht Athgabálae "appears to incorporate so many chronological layers that it could almost be regarded as an inadvertent history of the institution". The tension between the title of the tract and its content gives an example of these chronological layers. There are fives classes of distraint in the Cethairṡlicht Athgabálae, however the title refers to "four paths", reflecting the late development of a (restricted) class of distraint available to women. The 7th-century compiler of this version of Cethairṡlicht Athgabálae knew the archaic name of the tract, but the establishment of this fifth class of distraint meant he was in no position to understand its significance. His discussion of the title gives twenty different glosses of what the "four paths" could be, all erroneous.
