= Bretha Déin Chécht =

Early Irish legal text on illegal injury

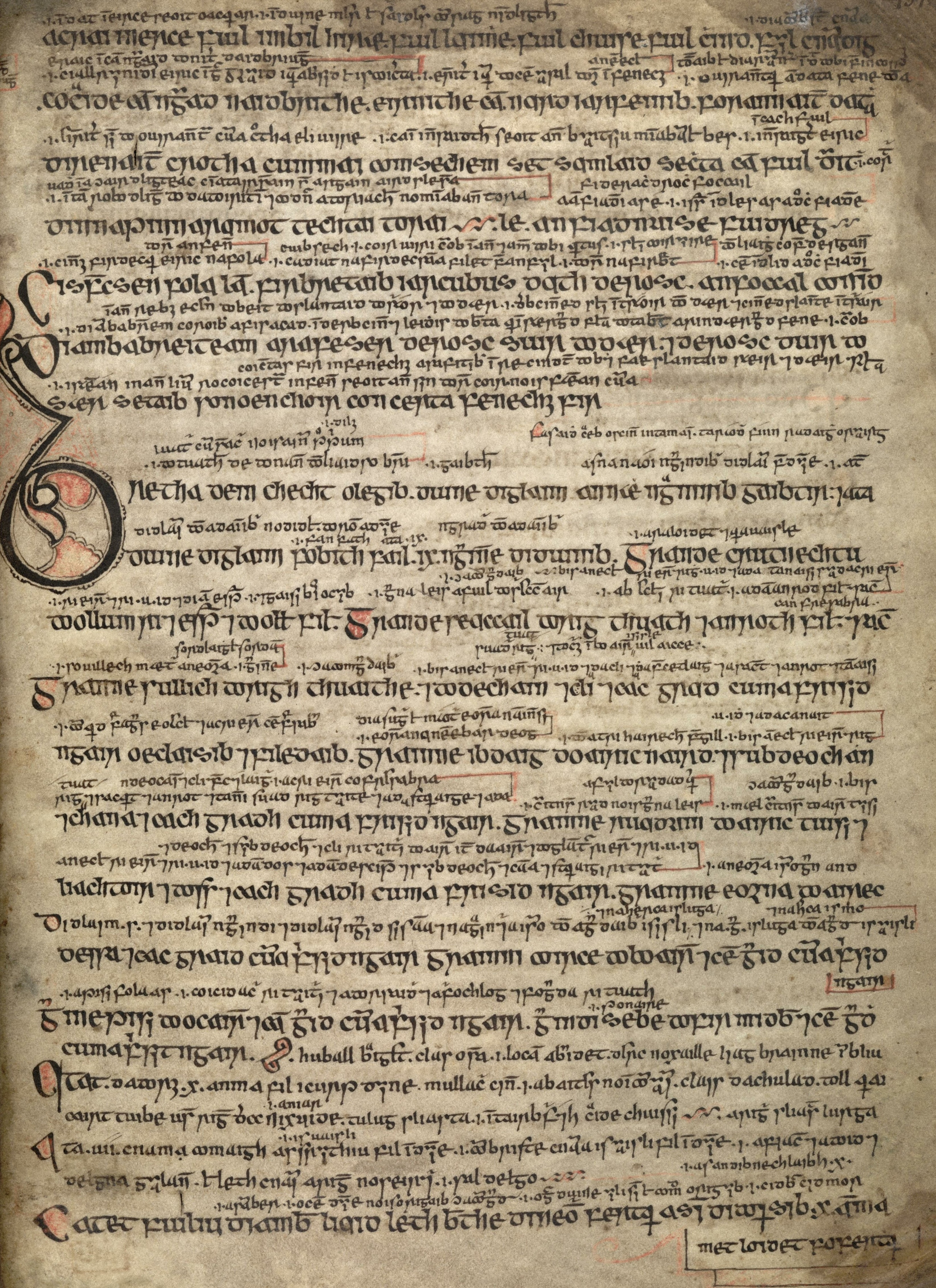
The beginning of Bretha Déin Chécht (National Library of Ireland MS G 11, p. 451)

Bretha Déin Chécht (Old Irish for "Judgments of Dian Cécht") is an early Irish legal text on the law of illegal injury, detailing the fines due to the injured in a great multitude of cases. The title attributes it to the mythological physician Dian Cecht.

It is the 34th text of the Senchas Már. It directly follows Bretha Crólige, a sister-tract on illegal injury.

== Manuscripts ==
A single manuscript preserves the complete text of Bretha Déin Chécht (National Library of Ireland MS G 11), alongside three other texts from the final third of the Senchas Már. D. A. Binchy edited this copy of the Bretha Déin Chécht, with translation and commentary, in 1966. A number of excerpts and commentaries on it have also survived, though fewer than have survived of Bretha Crólige. A purported quote from Bretha Déin Chécht in Bretha Étgid is probably a later invention.

== Contents ==
Bretha Déin Chécht is the 34th text of the collection of legal texts called the Senchas Már, placed in the final third of that collection. The Senchas Már is generally dated between the late 7th and early 8th century CE. A sister-tract on illegal injury, Bretha Crólige, directly precedes it in the Senchas Már.

Bretha Déin Chécht deals primarily with the fines a culprit must pay after illegal injury, detailing the percentage of that fine due to the physician and the percentage due to the victim. The complicated (and sometimes contradictory) tiers of fines detailed here appear to have perplexed later commentators. One such commentator deemed the text the anaicne diancecht ("exotic law of Dian Cécht").

The tract is attributed to Dian Cécht, a figure of Irish mythology who appears as the physician to the Tuatha Dé Danann, a band of euhemerized pre-Christian deities. He was presumably a pre-Christian healing or medicine god. The Senchas Már carries a late and pseudo-historical preface, which details the codification and Christianization of the compilation by Saint Patrick and his commissioners. Dian Cécht is explicitly listed as among the pre-Christian authors whose judgements were accepted because they did not contradict Christian teaching.

Beyond their value as a source for early Irish law, Bretha Crólige and Bretha Déin Chécht reveal much about the extent of medical knowledge and the kinds of treatment available in the period. For example, the six classes of tooth-injury (each with different fines) delineated in the Bretha Déin Chécht tell us something about the knowledge of dentistry in early medieval Ireland. The other available medical manuscripts reproduce medicine of a much later date (mostly borrowed from Arabic sources).
