= William Ó Deorádhain =

William Ó Deorádhain, Irish Professor of Jurisprudence, died 1405.

The Annals of Ulster, sub anno 1405, record the death of William Ua Deoradhain, namely, the best ollam of Leinster in jurisprudence.

He may have been related to Bishop of Leighlin Mauricius Ó Deóradháin, O.P., who was appointed 19 January 1524.

== See also ==
- Early Irish law
