= Críth Gablach =

Early Irish legal text on status

Críth Gablach (Old Irish for "The branched purchase") is an early Irish legal tract on the subject of status. It deals with the distinctions in law between free commoners, lords, and kings. It dates to the first half of the 8th century CE.

== Manuscripts and editions ==
The text of Críth Gablach is in three manuscripts, each incomplete, but together preserving the entirety of the Críth Gablach. Each manuscript is 16th century in date, and can be traced back to the law school of MacEgans. The earliest editor of the Críth Gablach was Eugene O'Curry (1873 and 1879), who also provided a translation, though "much of his translation is guesswork". Eoin MacNeill (1923) published a more reliable translation, and D. A. Binchy (1941) a new edition of the Old Irish text. As only one manuscript preserves the end of the tract, it is unclear whether the Críth Gablach was intended to end with the short legal poem (or roscad) which comes after its prose portion in the manuscript. Liam Breatnach argues that it was, while MacNeill and Binchy argue that it wasn't.

== Contents ==
Críth Gablach deals with the law of status. Equality before the law was not a principle of early Irish law (by contrast with the canon law also in force in Ireland) and its laws took great notice of distinction in rank. The worst offenses were punished by fining the offender the honour-price of the victim, a quantification of the victim's status. Críth Gablach deals with the differences in status of free individuals outside the church, not considering "poets and anyone whose rank depends on professional skill or knowledge". Críth Gablach comprises 606 lines of prose (excluding the legal poem). It has three sections: the first and longest deals with the distinctions between free commoners; the second, with the distinctions between lords and kings; the third and shortest, with the rights and obligations of kings.

The topic of status is dealt with in three surviving early Irish law tracts: Crith Gablach, Uraicecht Becc and Miadslechta. In the centuries after its composition, Críth Gablach seems to have been little glossed or quoted from. Uraicecht Becc, the more popular text on status, disagrees with Críth Gablach on several points. Binchy was sceptical about the reliability the picture of Irish society in Críth Gablach, accusing its author of "an extreme, and at times ludicrous, schematism". T. M. Charles-Edwards, on the other hand, deems Críth Gablach "one of the few outstanding pieces of social analysis from early medieval Europe" and "the nearest approach among the Irish laws to a text on kingship".

Binchy could not find a "satisfactory explanation" for the title Críth Gablach ("The branched purchase"). The introduction to Críth Gablach does no more than gloss the words individually; two later commentaries give explanations of the title, but both are of dubious value.

== Dating ==
Críth Gablach is generally dated to the first half of the 8th century CE. An internal reference to the 697 CE Law of Adomnán establishes a terminus post quem, whereas, as a reference to Críth Gablach in Bretha Nemed Toisech (dated to the second quarter of the 8th century), establishes a terminus ante quem. Another precise (though superfluous) terminus post quem may be provided by the tract's reference to an expulsion of the Saxons, which could be a reference to the failure of Ecgfrith of Northumbria's invasion of Brega in 684 CE. Charles-Edwards calls the tract "one of the most securely dated of [the] early Irish texts". The first half of the 8th century CE seems to have been a productive period in early Irish jurisprudence, as it is during this period that the ecclesiastical Collectio canonum Hibernensis and secular Senchas Már were first compiled.
