= Bretha Étgid =

Early Irish legal text on liability

Bretha Étgid or Éitgid (Old Irish for "Judgments of Inadvertence") is an early Irish legal text on liability for injury. It is only fragmentarily preserved, and written in a condensed style, but is our main source for the early Irish law of accidents. A section on pica has also been noted for giving valuable insight into the lives of women in medieval Irish society. It dates to the 8th century CE.

== Manuscripts and editions ==
There are seven manuscripts of Bretha Étgid, none complete. Only one of these manuscripts (Royal Irish Academy, MS 23 P 3) preserves the text of Bretha Étgid in a continuous fashion; the rest only give excerpts or quotes. This continuous manuscript preserves a much less abbreviated text than appears in the quotes or excerpts. In addition to this, O'Davoren's Glossary preserves a number of quotes from Bretha Étgid. D. A. Binchy described these manuscripts as using the quotes from Bretha Étgid as "pegs on which to hang voluminous commentaries".

An incomplete copy of Bretha Étgid (taken from Trinity College Dublin MS 1433) was edited and translated, alongside its commentaries and scholia, as part of the Ancient Laws of Ireland (Vol. 3, 1873). This edition is not very satisfactory. The editors of the Ancient Laws mis-titled the work Lebar Aicle ("Book of Aicill"), a 19th-century invented name which properly refers to the manuscript rather than the legal tract. Binchy complained that the inclusion of the commentaries and scholia in this incomplete edition had misled legal historians into thinking Bretha Étgid was a much more substantial work than it was.

== Contents ==
Bretha Étgid deals with cases of injury or homicide where the perpetrator has no liability. It is our main source for the Irish law of accidents. Neil McLeod dates it conjecturally to the 8th century CE.

The text begins with a discussion of the word éitged ("inadvertence, irresponsibility"). Following this a series of paragraphs beginning a maic ara feiser ("O son so that you would find out"), probably with the implied background of a king instructing his son. Following this are a series of paragraphs beginning blaí ("immunity"), giving cases in which a perpetrator is not responsible for some specific injury. Beyond this, there are paragraphs giving universal rules; a section formatted as questions and answers; and various else.

The text is very condensed. For example, in the blaí section the author states "the immunity (blaí) of hammers is an anvil", meaning that a blacksmith who injures a person who is irresponsibly near his work station is not liable. Because so much of the Bretha Étgid survives in excerpts, it is difficult to tell whether it originally contained material from other law tracts, or if later excerpters inserted those sections. Charlene Eska has commented on the difficulty of untangling the fragments of the mostly lost legal tract Muirbretha from the surviving text of Bretha Étgid. A later editor has given Bretha Étgid a pseudo-historical introduction, attributing the blaí and a maic sections to Cormac mac Airt, and the rest to Cenn Fáelad.

One section of Bretha Étgid deals with pica (unusual cravings) in pregnant women; it is notable for the rare insight it gives into the lives of women in medieval Ireland. The nature of medieval Irish agriculture was such that nutritional deficiency, and hence pica, was common in the winter months. The Bretha Étgid states that a woman with cravings is not legally liable for stealing some limited amount of food (with different limits, depending on whether it is stolen from a stranger or her husband); that it is an offense for the husband not to satisfy his wife's cravings; and that it is an offence for the wife not to tell her husband of her cravings. The justification given for these rules is that denial of food could harm the foetus.

Binchy suggested that Bretha Étgid (alongside the legal tracts Uraicecht Becc, Cóic Conara Fugill, and the first and second Bretha Nemed) was the work of a hypothesised Nemed school, perhaps located in Munster. Binchy suggested that there was a strong pagan element in the writings of this school; this contention has come under criticism from Donnchadh Ó Corráin, Liam Breatnach and Aidan Breen.
