= Senchas Már =

Collection of early Irish legal texts

Senchas Már (Old Irish for "Great Tradition") is the largest collection of early Irish legal texts, compiled into a single group sometime in the 8th century, though individual tracts vary in date. These tracts were almost certainly written by a variety of authors, though some suggest that certain authors wrote more than one of the included tracts. The collection was apparently made somewhere in the north midlands. The Senchas Már tracts have been subjected to the greatest amount of glossing and commentary in later manuscripts. Moreover, one of the few examples of Old Irish glossing has been given to the various texts of Senchas Már. These glosses were apparently made in Munster.

The text has been arranged into thirds; three was apparently an important number to the Irish. A number of laws were grouped into threes, called triads—a practice also common in the Welsh. One scholar has recently suggested that there were a number of groups of six including one single tract, generally from the first third, two contiguous tracts generally in the second third, and three contiguous tracts from the third third. Each group of six is theorised as related to each other in various ways. The prologue ascribes the authorship of the book to a committee of nine appointed by St Patrick to revise the laws. It was composed of three kings, three bishops, and three professors of literature, poetry, and law. Chief among the latter was Dubthach. It became his duty to give a historical retrospect, and in doing so he exhibited "all the judgments of true nature which the Holy Ghost had spoken from the first occupation of this island down to the reception of the faith. What did not clash with the word of God in the written law and in the New Testament and with the consciences of believers was confirmed in the laws of the brehons by Patrick and by the ecclesiastics and chieftains of Ireland. This is the Senchus Mor."

== Pseudo-historical Prologue ==
The Pseudo-Historical Prologue was not an original part of the Senchas Már, but was actually a later addition that attempted to give historical background. There is also an original introduction distinct from this text. The Pseudo-Historical Prologue was concerned with the changes in the Brehon law, which it suggested occurred with the arrival of Christianity. In effect, Saint Patrick is supposed to have blessed the mouth of the Chief Ollam of Ireland, Dubhthach moccu Lughair, who then gave judgment on a particular case regarding the killing of Saint Odran an assistant and charioteer to Saint Patrick and then continued to recite the rest of the law leaving unaltered those laws acceptable to God and altering those that were not. This case is also given as the reason why Brehon law did not favour capital punishment. Although it states numerous times that the death penalty was an option in numerous cases, including failing to intervene in a murder or attempted murder, the legal killing of trespassers and the death of criminals who violated various other sections of the law in Heptad XXXV in Vol. IV.

While the murderer of Patrick's assistant was killed and immediately sent to heaven because he was forgiven by Patrick, future murderers were to be pardoned as Patrick would not be around to assure their forgiveness and ascent to heaven, but also states "as long as they do not relapse into Evil again" and "Let everyone who is a criminal suffer the death of a criminal" and the duality of the mortal person and their eternal soul was referenced at the closing of the Judgement, sentencing Nuadh (the person) to death, but allowing his soul forgiveness to enter heaven, as his crime has been atoned for.

There is no reason to think that the events described actually occurred, although they do provide insight into how the Brehons thought about their own law.

== Contents ==
This reconstruction of the contents of Senchas Már follows Liam Breatnach (2010):

[Start of first third]

1. Introduction
2. Cethairṡlicht Athgabálae
2a. Di Choimét Dligthech
3. Di Gnímaib Gíall
4. Cáin Íarraith
5. Cáin Sóerraith
6. Cáin Aicillne
7. Cáin Lánamna
8. Córus Bésgnai

[Start of middle third]

9. Sechtae
10. Bretha Comaithchesa
11. Din Techtugud
12. Tosach Bésgnai
13. Recholl Breth
14. Di Astud Chirt ⁊ Dligid
15. Di Thúaslucud Rudrad
16. Fuidir-tract
17. Di Fodlaib Cenéoil Túaithe
18. Di Dligiud Raith ⁊ Somaíne la Flaith
19. Dire-tract
20. Bandire-tract
21. Bechbretha
22. Coibnes Uisci Thairidne
23. Bretha im Fuillemu Gell
24. Bretha im Gatta

[Start of final third]

25. Court-tract
26. Status-tract.
27. Bretha for Techt Medbae
28. Bretha for Macslechtaib
29. Bretha for Catslechtaib
30. Bretha for Conslechtaib
31. Bretha Cairdi
32. Slicht Othrusa
33. Bretha Crólige
34. Bretha Déin Chécht
35. Injury-tract.
36. Bretha Creidini
37. Lestrai
38. Muirbretha
39. Bésgnae Ráithe
40. Tract on Marriage and Divorce.
41. Fidbretha
42. Di Brethaib Gaire
43. Dúilchinni
44. Bretha Sén Formae
45. Córus Aithni
46. Diguin-tract.
47. Turbaid-tract

== Individual legal tracts ==
=== Cethairṡlicht Athgabálae ===
Literally the four paths of distraint, a process by which one could, under certain circumstances, seize goods owned by another. In Brehon law one does not immediately own the property, rather animals are taken to an intermediary land to wait in case the original owner pays the debt. As time passes, the animals are slowly forfeited. This tract deals primarily with four types of distraint divided based on the waiting period. The waiting period apparently varies based on the circumstance although no one has yet determined what exactly those circumstances are. Other material present includes information on other aspects of legal procedure and a long section where the author asks and then answers multiple times, why the tract is called Cethairslicht Athgabálae.

=== Cáin Sóerraith and Cáin Aicillne ===
These two texts, "The Regulation of Noble Fief" and "Regulation of Base Clientship", deal with the structure of lord client relations. These two tracts regulate the circumstances of entering into clientship as well as setting forth what goods and services were given by the lord in return for what goods and services the client gave.

See Joseph Fisher's 1877 article on The History of Landholding in Ireland which was published in the Transactions of the Royal Historical Society. Fisher, who coined the term social Darwinism, was commenting on how a system for borrowing livestock which had been called "tenure" had led to the false impression that the early Irish had already evolved or developed land tenure:

These arrangements did not in any way affect that which we understand by the word " tenure", that is, a man's farm, but they related solely to cattle, which we consider a chattel. It has appeared necessary to devote some space to this subject, inasmuch as that usually acute writer Sir Henry Maine has accepted the word " tenure " in its modern interpretation, and has built up a theory under which the Irish chief " developed " into a feudal baron. I can find nothing in the Brehon laws to warrant this theory of social Darwinism, and believe further study will show that the Cáin Saerrath and the Cáin Aigillne relate solely to what we now call chattels, and did not in any way affect what we now call the freehold, the possession of the land.

— Joseph Fisher

=== Cáin Lánamna ===
This tract, the "Law of Couples", deals with not only regulations for marriage but for other unions as well. It lists tens types of coupling including three types of formal marriage, five unions where there are sexual relations but no sharing of property or cohabitating, union by rape and union by two who are mentally incompetent. The text then goes on to deal with common property as well as how it is divided upon divorce.

=== Córus Bésgnai ===
The vaguely named tract Córus Bésgnai (or Córus Béscnai) has been translated as both "The Ordering of Discipline" or "The Regulation of Proper Behavior". This tract describes the relationship between the Church and the people as a contract; the people have to donate tithes and first fruits and the like, while the church must provide services such as baptism and make sure that its members must be honest, devout, and qualified. This text has been used both to show church influence on Brehon law and also to point to certain aspects that canon lawyers would disapprove of.

=== Sechtae ===
At the beginning of the second third of the Senchas Már is a collection of "Heptads" or collections of seven related rules (although in some cases there are more than seven). This tract actually has no single theme, rather it is useful for what it can say about various aspects of Brehon law. The tract includes sixty-five heptads, although more appear elsewhere in the Senchas Már.

=== Bechbretha and Coibes Uisci Thairdne ===
"Bee-Judgments" and "Kinship of Conducted Water" are two tracts some scholars believe were written by the same author. These two tracts both present legal information about a relatively new animal and technological introductions to Irish law from elsewhere in Europe, Honey Bees and Watermills. Hence they show the Brehons adapting to new legal challenges. In particular, this is one area where it is possible to see a legal analogy in action.

=== Slicht Othrusa, Bretha Crólige and Bretha Déin Chécht ===
Sections on Sick-Maintenance, Judgments of Blood-Lyings and Judgments of Dían Cécht are three contiguous tracts in the final third of the Senchas Már. The first two deal with the practice of sick maintenance (see above) and the third deals with payments for injuries. Unfortunately Slicht Othrusa only survives as a fragment. These tracts give us most of our knowledge on the law regarding injury, while a few other tracts cover specific situations.
