= Celtica (journal) =

Academic journal, 1946-

- Discipline: Celtic studies
- Language: English, Irish
- Edited by: Barry J. Lewis, Ruairí Ó hUiginn

Publication details
- History: 1946–present
- Publisher: School of Celtic Studies (Dublin Institute for Advanced Studies)
- Frequency: Annual

Standard abbreviations
- ISO 4: Celtica

Indexing
- ISSN: 0069-1399

Links
- Journal homepage

Celtica: Journal of the School of Celtic Studies is an academic journal devoted to Celtic studies, with particular emphasis on Irish literature, linguistics and placenames. It was established in 1946 and has since been published by the School of Celtic Studies at the Dublin Institute for Advanced Studies. In 2022 the journal became open access, with volume 35 being the first to be released without a paywall.

Previous editors-in-chief include T.F. O'Rahilly (1946–1950) and Fergus Kelly. Volume 33 was edited by Barry J. Lewis and Ruairí Ó hUiginn.

== Contents ==
- Official website
- PDFs of vols. 20-25.
