= Corpus Iuris Hibernici =

Collection of Irish legal texts

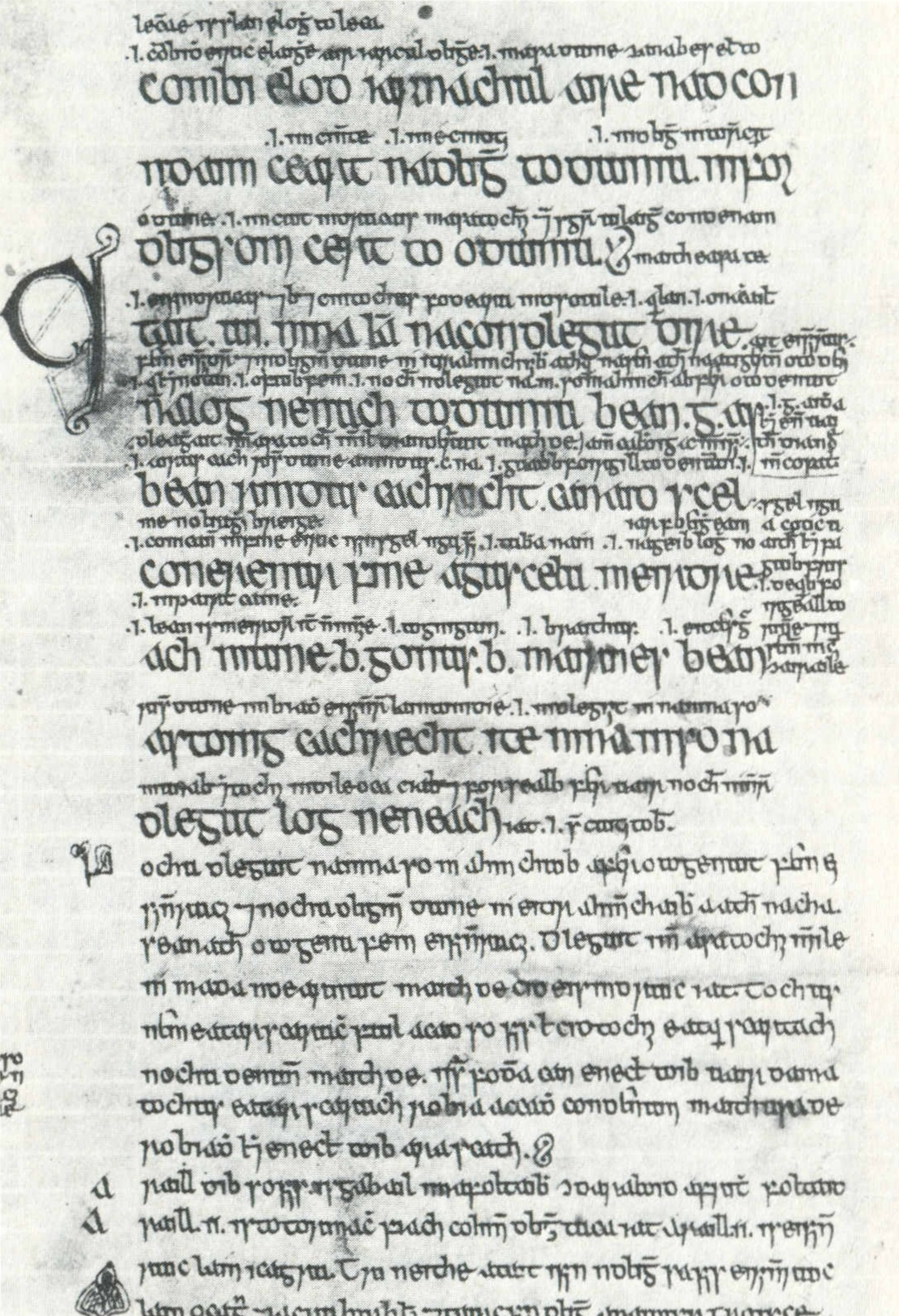
The text of a heptad in a 15th-century manuscript of early Irish law (Dublin, Trinity College, MS 1316). The heptad is reproduced in CIH 538.17-20; the interlinear glosses are in CIH 538.21-33; and the commentary at the foot of the page is in CIH 538.34-539.6.

The Corpus Iuris Hibernici (cited as CIH) is a six-volume collection of the sources for the study of early Irish law (known as Brehon law) edited by D. A. Binchy. It presents a transcription of the manuscripts (Old Irish and Latin) relevant to this study.

The CIH was intended as a replacement for the Ancient Laws of Ireland (1865-1901), a series which relied on more limited sources and suffered from unscholarly and unreliable editorial work (with the exception of that done by Robert Atkinson). Prior to Binchy's work, the best sources for early Irish law were the unpublished transcripts of John O'Donovan and Eugene O'Curry, which circulated in scholarly libraries in a few (often incomplete) copies. Because of this, scholars like Rudolf Thurneysen were forced to rely on O'Donovan and O'Curry to correct errors in the published version, but nonetheless referred to the Ancient Laws of Ireland in their published footnotes for reasons of accessibility.

Though the CIH was highly rated for its editorial work, it received some criticism for its difficulty of use. Critics pointed out that it had no translations, no explanatory notes, few cross-references, and a table of contents which only listed the manuscripts transcribed. Myles Dillon called the work "austere". T. M. Charles Edwards suggested that, rather than produce an edition of the manuscripts, a scholar of Binchy's stature could well have produced a critical edition of the texts themselves. Fergus Kelly's Guide to early Irish law (1988) and Liam Breatnach's Companion to the Corpus iuris hibernici (2005) took on the task of identifying, describing, and making comprehensible these texts. Breatnach has identified 102 individual texts in the CIH and has incorporated elsewhere published texts (such as the archaic legal poem published previously by Binchy) into the corpus.

== Bibliography ==
- Binchy, D. A. (1971). "An archaic legal poem". Celtica. 9: 152–168.
- Binchy, D. A. (1978). Corpus Iuris Hibernici (6 vols.). Dublin: Institute for Advanced Studies.
- Binchy, D. A. (1983). "Corpus Iuris Hibernici — Incipit or Finit Amen?". In Mac Eoin, Gearóid (ed.). Proceedings of the Sixth International Congress of Celtic Studies, 1979. Dublin: Institute for Advanced Studies. pp. 149–164.
- Breatnach, Liam (2005). A companion to the Corpus Iuris Hibernici. Early Irish Law Series. Vol. 5. Dublin: Institute for Advanced Studies.
- Kelly, Fergus (1988). A Guide to Early Irish Law. Early Irish Law Series. Vol. 3. Dublin: Institute for Advanced Studies.
- Melia, Daniel F. (1987). "A Computer-Assisted Index of the Corpus Juris Hibernici". In MacLennan, Gordon W. (ed.). Proceedings of the North American Congress of Celtic Studies, 1986. Ottawa: University of Ottawa. pp. 133–156.
