= Robin Stacey =

American historian

Robin Chapman Stacey is an American medievalist and celticist based at the University of Washington, Seattle. After finishing her undergraduate life, she attended the University of Oxford where she complete her M. Litt. under Thomas Charles-Edwards, learning Welsh with the tutorship of David Ellis Evans. In 1986 she completed a Ph.D. with a thesis on Irish and Welsh law at Yale University, under John Boswell. Since 1988 she has been teaching at the University of Washington, where she is now a professor in history.

In addition to many individual scholarly articles, she is the author of the following monographs:

- The Road to Judgment: From Custom to Court in Medieval Ireland and Wales. Philadelphia: University of Pennsylvania Press, 1994, ISBN 0-8122-3216-X
- Dark Speech: The Performance of Law in Early Ireland. Philadelphia: University of Pennsylvania Press, 2007

Dark Speech was a winner of the American Conference for Irish Studies' James S. Donnelly Sr. Prize for Books on History and Social Sciences in 2007.

Stacey is a recipient of the University of Washington's Distinguished Teaching Awards. Her husband, Robert Stacey, is a divisional dean, and Stroum Endowed Chair, in the Dean's Office of the University of Washington's College of Arts & Sciences.
