= Fergus Kelly =

Fergus Kelly MRIA
- Born: Ireland
- Education: B.A. – University College Dublin (UCD); Ph.D. – Trinity College Dublin (TCD)
- Known for: A Guide to Early Irish Law (1988)

Fergus Samuel Kelly MRIA is an academic at the Dublin Institute for Advanced Studies. His research interests centre on early Irish law-texts and wisdom-texts.

He graduated in 1967 in Early and Modern Irish from Trinity College Dublin. He spent a year in the University of Oslo's Linguistics Institute. He also taught a course in Celtic Civilisation at the University of Toronto. He is now a Senior Professor in the School of Celtic Studies (Irish: Scoil an Léinn Cheiltigh) of the Dublin Institute for Advanced Studies. In 2003 he delivered the British Academy's Sir John Rhŷs Memorial Lecture. A prolific author and researcher, he has written and edited a number of books and many articles including A guide to early Irish law. He co-edits the journal Celtica and has collaborated with many others, including Thomas Charles-Edwards.

== Awards and recognition ==
Kelly was granted the highest academic honour in Ireland, membership of the Royal Irish Academy in 2004.

== Publications ==
Kelly's publications include:

- Audacht Morainn (Dublin 1976)
- A guide to early Irish law (Dublin 1988, reprinted 1991, 1995)
- Early Irish farming: the evidence of the law-texts (Dublin 1997, reprinted 1998)
- Marriage Disputes: A Fragmentary Old Irish Law-Text (Dublin, 2014)
- The Life & Work of Oisín Kelly (Carlow, 2015)
- The MacEgan legal treatise (Dublin, 2020). Edition of work by Giolla na Naomh Mac Aodhagáin.
