= Early Irish law =

Legal system of early medieval Ireland

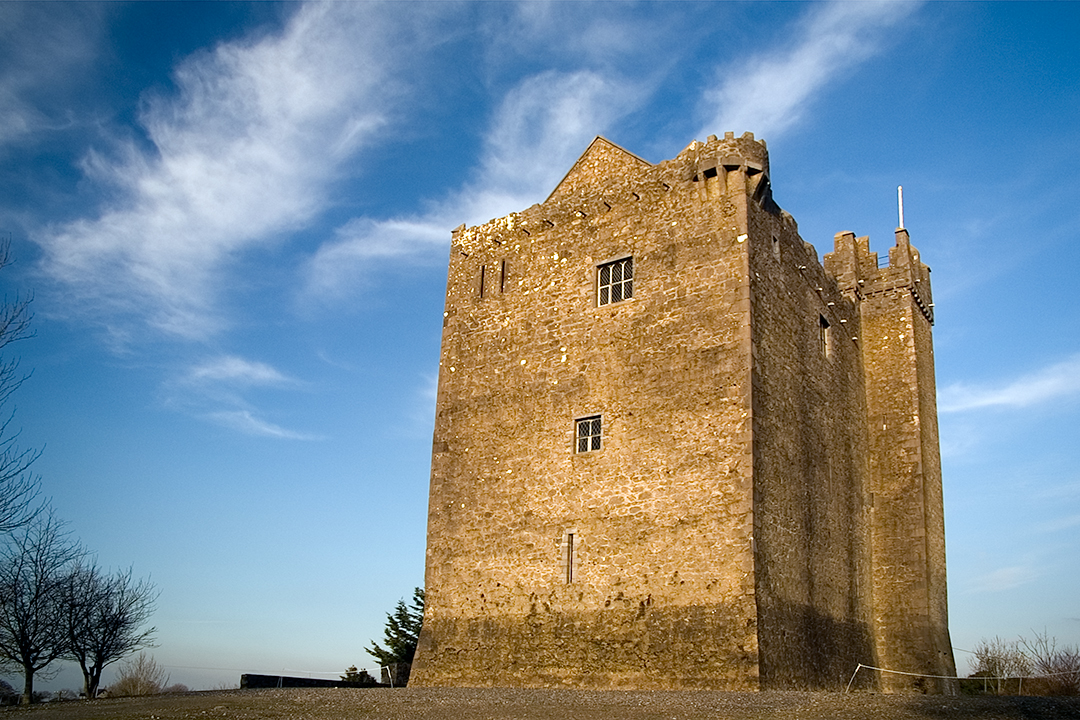
Redwood Castle, County Tipperary, although built by the Normans, was later occupied by the MacEgan juristic family and served as a school of Irish law under them.

Early Irish law, also called Brehon law (from the old Irish word breithim meaning judge), comprised the statutes which governed everyday life in Gaelic Ireland. They applied in Early Medieval Ireland and were partially eclipsed by the Norman invasion of 1169, but underwent a resurgence on most of the territory of the island from the 13th century, coexisting in parallel with English common law, which eventually surpassed them in the 17th century. Early Irish law was often mixed with Christian influence and juristic innovation. For centuries, these secular laws existed in parallel, and occasionally in conflict, with canon law and English common law, the latter of which was first introduced in Ireland in the 12th century.

The laws were a civil rather than a criminal code, concerned with the payment of compensation for harm done and the regulation of property, inheritance and contracts; the concept of state-administered punishment for crime was foreign to Ireland's early jurists. They show Ireland in the early medieval period to have been a hierarchical society, taking great care to define social status, and the rights and duties that went with it, according to property, and the relationships between lords and their clients and serfs.

The secular legal texts of Ireland were edited by D. A. Binchy in his six-volume Corpus Iuris Hibernici. The oldest surviving law tracts were first written down in the seventh century and compiled in the eighth century.

== Origins ==
Early Irish law consisted of the accumulated decisions of the Brehons, or judges, guided entirely by an oral tradition. Some of these laws were recorded in writing by Christian clerics. The earliest theory to be recorded is contained in the Prologue to the Senchas Már. According to that text, after a difficult case involving St. Patrick, the Saint supervised the mixing of native Irish law and the law of the church. A representative of every group came and recited the laws related to that group, and they were written down and collected into the Senchas Már, excepting that any law that conflicted with church law was replaced. The story also tells how the law transitioned from the keeping of the poets, whose speech was "dark" and incomprehensible, to the keeping of each group who had an interest in it. The story is extremely dubious as not only is it written many centuries after the events it depicts, but it also incorrectly dates the collection of the Senchas Már to the time of St. Patrick while scholars have been able to determine that it was collected during the 8th century, at least three centuries after the time of St. Patrick. Some of the ideas in the tale may be correct, and it has been suggested by modern historians that the Irish jurists were an offshoot from the poetic class that had preserved the laws. According to the Annals of Ulster, the Senchas Már was written in AD 438.

Historians, such as D. A. Binchy, have usually viewed the laws as conservative and especially useful for reconstructing the laws and customs of the Proto-Indo-Europeans just as linguists had reconstructed the Proto-Indo-European language. For instance, historians have seen similarities between Irish and Indian customs of fasting as a method of shaming a wrongdoer to recover a debt, or to demand the righting of a wrong. Other legal institutions prominent in early Irish law but foreign to most contemporary legal systems, such as the use of sureties, have been considered as survivals from earlier periods. Clearly old material is found in a number of legal terms that have been shown to have originated in the period before the Celtic languages split up, because they are preserved both in Old Irish and in the Welsh legal texts.

Other historians have emphasised elements of Christian, ecclesiastical and Latin-language origins in the preserved law texts and have argued that the laws as recorded represent a compromise between native pagan legal lore and the imported ecclesiastical tradition. It has even been suggested that the texts may have been produced by clerics and not, as usually assumed, by a separate class of professional lay jurists. Still, this is controversial because there remain many stark divergences and contradictions between the main body of Early Irish law on the one hand and Christian and continental tradition on the other. Early Irish legal texts that are indeed known to originate from the church, such as Cáin Adomnáin and Cáin Domnaig, also differ in their principles from most Early Irish law in a number of ways.

Early Irish law texts are not always consistent. Early Irish law is, like the Old Irish language, remarkably standard across an Island with no central authority; as one scholar wrote, "The edifice of the law stands above all local and regional rivalries as a unified system." Even so, close examination has revealed some variations. Among these one can especially point to variations both in style and content between two of the major legal schools, as they are known: those that produced the Bretha Nemed and Senchas Már.

== Substantive law ==
=== Women and marriage ===
Indications of women's status is indicated by the honour price system. A typical woman did not carry an honour price: a position shared with children, the insane, slaves, and others. However, there were many exceptions: for example, status was gained through inheritance. At times, some rose to ranks of leadership, and women, like men, were Brehons. Brehon Laws have a reputation among modern scholars as rather progressive in their treatment of women, with some describing the law as providing for equality between the sexes. The Laws generally reflect a patriarchal and patrilineal society in which the rules of inheritance were based on agnatic descent. It has sometimes been assumed that the patriarchal elements of the law are the result of influence by canon law or continental practice displacing an older, more egalitarian ancient Celtic tradition, but this is based mainly on conjecture and there is little hard evidence to support such claims.

Cáin Adomnáin, a Christian Law, promulgated by the Synod of Birr in 697, sought to raise the status of women of that era, although the actual effect is unknown. Regardless, although Irish society under the Brehon Laws was male-dominated, women had greater freedom, independence and rights to property than in other European societies of the time. Men and women held their property separately. The marriage laws were very complex. For example, there were scores of ways of combining households and properties and then dividing the property and its increase when disputes arose.

Divorce was provided for on a number of grounds (that ultimately deal with the inability to have a child), after which property was divided according to what contribution each spouse had made to the household. A husband was legally permitted to hit his wife to "correct" her, but if the blow left a mark she was entitled to the equivalent of her bride-price in compensation and could, if she wished, divorce him. The property of a household could not be disposed of without the consent of both spouses.

Polygamy was also supported, and regulated with complex codes. Later it was justified by reference to the Old Testament although church authorities opposed it.

Under Western Catholic church law, women were still largely subject to their fathers or husbands and were not normally permitted to act as witnesses, their testimony being considered "biased and dishonest".

=== Kingship ===
While scholars have discovered a fair amount of information about how Irish Kingship worked, relatively little is actually related to early Irish laws. In particular, very little material survives regarding succession practices, which have been reconstructed as the system of Tanistry. A section of the Senchas Már tract on status was apparently devoted to succession, although little survives. Most early material on succession was collected by Domhnal O'Davoren in the 16th century. Another seemingly important omission is that the laws never mention the High King of Ireland centred at Tara. Likewise, the laws only once mention the practice of individuals being ineligible for kingship if they are blemished (a practice more widely evident elsewhere, especially in Irish mythology). That mention is only incidental to a regulation on the compensation for bee stings when the legal tract Bechbretha relates the story of Congal Cáech, who was deposed on account of being blinded by a bee.

A fair amount of the material on kings relates to their position within the Irish laws of status, which see, of which the king is ranked at the top, parallel with the Bishops and the highest level of poets. Three levels of kings are referred to in the status tracts, such as Críth Gablach: rí benn, (the king of peaks) who is identified elsewhere as the rí túaithe (king of a [single] túath), who is below the rí buiden (the king of bands) who is identified with the rí túath (king of [multiple] túaths) or ruiri (overking), who in turn is below the rí bunaid cach cinn (the ultimate king of every individual) who is known also as the rí ruirech (king of overkings) and rí cóicid (king of a province).

To a certain degree, kings acted as agents of the law. While other kings in Europe were able to promulgate law, such as Alfred the Great and his Doom book, Irish kings had very little authority to do so. They could collaborate on law authored by the church. Cáin Adomnáin has the names of many kings attached to it who apparently enacted and enforced the law. Additionally, a king could issue a temporary law in times of emergency. But kings could not, by their own authority, issue permanent law codes. Kings also acted as judges, although the extent of their power compared to that of professional jurists has been debated. One law tract, Gubretha Caratniad, describes a brithem giving advice to a king (in this case, advice that seems flawed but is actually correct) who then gives it as a judgment in a case. It is not clear how much kings made judgments by themselves and how much they had to follow professional advice. The kings do not appear to have stood as judges in all cases, and in some cases, the professional jurists took that role.

One subject the laws did cover is how the king fit within the rest of the legal system. The king was not supposed to be above the law. Some stipulations applied specifically to the king. With a king being the most powerful individual, and the one with the highest honour in an area, it was difficult to enforce the law against him. Although it might have been possible to proceed against the king as against any other, the laws also had an innovative solution to this quandary. Instead of enforcing against the king directly, a dependent of the king known as an aithech fortha (substitute churl) was enforced against instead, and the king was responsible for repaying the substitute churl. The laws also specified certain cases in which a king lost his honor price. These included doing the work of a commoner, moving around without a retinue, and showing cowardice in battle; again, though, it is unclear how often such stipulations were followed.

Finally, the laws commented on how the king was to arrange his life and holdings and how many individuals should be in his retinue. In particular, Críth Gablach gives a highly schematized and unrealistic account of how the king spends his week: Sunday is for drinking ale, Monday is for judging, Tuesday is for playing fidchell, Wednesday is for watching hounds hunt, Thursday is for sexual union, Friday is for racing horses, and Saturday is for judging (a different word from Monday, but the distinction is unclear).

=== Status ===
According to the introduction to the Senchas Már, the world had numerous problems before the creation of that text. Among those problems was that everyone was in a state of equality. Unequal status was of great import to early Irish Christian society and it is recorded in many places in the early Irish laws.

The Irish law texts describe a highly segmented world, in which each person had a set status that determined what legal tasks they could undertake and what recompense they could receive when a crime was committed against them. Críth Gablach and Uraicecht Becc are two of the main texts focusing on lay landholders, the latter of which also briefly covers the status of skilled individuals and of clerics. Other texts describe other groups, such as Uraicecht na Ríar, which focuses on the status of poets.

Much depended on status, and each rank was assigned an honour that was quantified in an honour-price to be paid to them if their honour was violated by certain crimes. The types of food one received as a guest in another's house, or while being cared for due to injury varied based on status. Lower honour prices limited the ability to act as sureties and as witnesses. Those of higher status could "over-swear" the oaths of those of lower status.

==== Ecclesiastical grades ====
In part, the seven ecclesiastical grades originate outside Ireland (as holy orders, later subdivided into minor orders and major orders) although their position in Ireland has been shaped by local thinking. The grades are given in Uraicecht Becc as liachtor (lector), aistreóir (doorkeeper), exarcistid (exorcist), subdeochain (sub-deacon), deochain (deacon), sacart (priest), and escop (bishop) although Bretha Déin Chécht puts the lector in a third position. The seven grades are subsumed into the Irish law of status, but it is unclear to what degree they conformed to all of the various status stipulations. According to Críth Gablach, the seven grades of the church are the basis for the theoretical seven lay and poetic grades (see below). At the same time it is clear that the number seven is an insular invention, in the Eastern Church there were normally five or six grades (sometimes more), and the Western Church typically had eight or nine grades.

Although the various groups were theoretically on par with each other, the church apparently had supremacy. Críth Gablach states "Who is nobler, the king or the bishop? The bishop is nobler, for the king rises up before him on account of the Faith; moreover, the bishop raises his knee before the king." This relative ranking is reflected elsewhere. In addition, according to Críth Gablach the ranking of the lay grades was modeled after the ecclesiastical grades in that there should be seven grades, a number rarely met perfectly.

==== Lay grades ====
Irish law recognised a number of classes, from unfree to king, which were ranked within the status tracts. Little space was given to the unfree, which reflects the lack of dependence upon slaves as opposed to other societies, such as Ancient Rome. The laws discuss slaves, both male and female, and the term for a female slave, Cumhall, became a broader currency term. Anthropologist David Graeber suggests this indicates a significant trade in female slaves was present not long before the laws were written. As unfree, slaves could not be legal agents either for themselves or others. In addition to the wholly unfree, a few individuals were semi-free. The senchléithe (hereditary serf) was bound to work the land of his master, whereas the fuidir had no independent status or land of his own, but could at least leave as he might desire.

Others might be of less than full status, based on age or origin. The status of children was based on their parents, and they could not act independently. The rights of sons increased with age, but they did not fully increase until after the death of the father. A young son just out on his own was called a fer midboth (a man of middle huts), apparently, someone who occupied a hut on his father's land. These persons were semi-independent but did not have the full honour price of a free man until they reached 20. Even after a certain age, a "Son of a Living Father" was expected to be dutiful to his father and could only set up an independent household with his father's permission. In addition, those from outside a túath normally had a low status, as status was based not only on property but also on familial connections.

There are two main ranks of commoners, the ócaire (lit. "young lord") and bóaire ("cow lord"), though Binchy thinks the ócaire is a recent offshoot of the latter, who had less property but was still a freeman. In addition are the bóaire febsa (a bóaire of quality who had an honour-price of 5 séts). The highest commoner was the mruigfer ("land man"). Either of the last, according to Binchy, may be the "normal bóaire" who appears within the law texts. The three ranks of commoners, at least according to the status tract, vary in the type of clientship they undertook and the property they could hold, though it is unclear how this worked in practice. Commoners apparently had to co-operate in farming as they did not have enough property to own a whole plough-share or all the rights in a mill.

Above these are a series of lords who apparently had clients of their own—the primary factor in lordship—as well as more property and a higher honour price. According to Críth Gablach, each grade of lord increase by 5 séts for each rank, and also increased the number of clients. In addition, when they travelled they were expected to maintain a retinue with them. A lord not only had greater ability but also needed to take greater steps to preserve their honour, lest they lose their lordship. The order of lords varies, but in Críth Gablach it is as follows: aire déso ("lord of vassals"), aire ard ("high lord"), aire tuíseo ("lord of precedence"), and the aire forgill ("lord of superior testimony").

After the normal lords were the tánaise ríg, who was supposed to be heir to the throne. He had higher property qualifications than the aire forgill, but his prime claim to higher status was that he would one day be king. Kings held the highest status that the laws describe. The basic king had an honour price of seven cumals, and higher kings had yet a higher status. Having the highest status, the king especially was expected to be careful to keep his honour. Cowardice, as demonstrated in flight from battle, as well as taking up manual labour might cost him his honour-price.

These grades are generally equated with the seven grades of clerics, although there is some discrepancy as to how the grades line up, with various texts doing it in different ways and selecting only certain lay grades and ignoring others.

The ranking of lay grades has been seen by many scholars as rather schematic and not reflecting realities on the ground. Some of the texts give considerable detail on diet, tools owned, the number of livestock, and even the size of the house a person of a given status had. Modern scholars have generally assumed such details rarely match exactly what someone of a given rank had. In addition, Críth Gablach contains the fee a client paid to a lord, according to rank from the lowest free man through the noble ranks, even though no noble would be another's client.

==== Poetic grades ====
Paralleling the status of the lay grades are the grades of the filid (poets). Each poetic rank corresponds to a particular lay (and ecclesiastical) rank, from Bóaire to king. In Uraicecht na Ríar these are given as fochloc, macfuirmid, dos, cano, clí, ánruth, and ollam. These are given the same status as and the same honour prices as the lay grades, and hence have effectively the same rights. The qualifications for each grade is where the difference occurs. The qualifications fit into three categories, the status of the poet's parent or grandparent, their skill and their training. A particular number of compositions are given for each rank, with the ollam having 350.

In addition to the seven main ranks, variously named ranks below these seem to be names for unskilled poets, the taman, drisiuc, and oblaires. Their honour prices are no more than a pittance, and their poetry is apparently painful to hear.

==== Other grades ====
Other professions could give status based on the profession and the skill, but no professions besides poets could have a status as high as the bishop, king, or highest poet. For instance, in one text the jurist or brithem had three ranks, and the highest was given an honour price only halfway up the other scales. The ranking of a brithem was based on his skill and whether he knew all three components of law (here: traditional law, poetry, and canon law), or fewer. A craftsman who worked with wood could have similar honour prices but these were based on his craftsmanship. A physician and a blacksmith, among other ranks, had an even lower honour price—less than half what the brithem could achieve, and the honour price apparently did not vary based on skill. Other professionals, such as makers of chariots or engravers, had still lower honour prices (less than that of a bóaire). Finally, a few professions received only meagre ranks, as with the lowest poets, and the authors may be actively making fun of some of the professions, such as comb makers.

==== Change in status ====
Status in early Ireland was not entirely rigid and it was possible for a family to raise its status. If three consecutive generations—grandfather, father, and son—had the property qualifications of a lord, or the poetic qualifications of a higher level poet, etc., then the member of the third generation became a lord. On the other hand, the son or grandson of a lord, or a poet, etc., who did not have the proper qualifications, did not have that status. The grandson of a person with a certain status could have that status themselves, assuming they had the proper qualifications, even if their father did not.

This created an interesting in-between stage. A commoner who had the property qualifications but not the parentage to become a lord is variously referred to as a flaith aithig, (a commoner lord), a fer fothlai (a man of withdrawal), or an aire iter da airig (an aire [here with a broader meaning than lord] between two [types of] aires). According to Críth Gablach, these individuals had status in between a commoner and a full lord. In the case of poets, a poet with skill qualifications but who did not have proper training was a bard. According to Breatnach poets who were not allied with the church were given this rank for that reason.

In addition, there were ways that, in an extraordinary circumstance, an individual could achieve higher status without having parents with such qualifications. Someone who chose to become a briugu (hospitaller) could have twice the normal property qualifications of a lord of whatever grade (and this can extend, in theory, up to the qualifications of a king). Further, a briugu had to open his house to any guests. This included feeding them, no matter how large the group—he could lose his status if he ever refused a guest. Because of that stipulation, the position of briugu was potentially ruinous, and this outcome is portrayed in a number of tales such as in Togail Bruidne Da Derga and Scela Mucce Meic Datho. A commoner might also ascend to the status of a lord if he is a aire échta (lord of violence). Such a person helped individuals to avenge deaths committed in another túath for a limited time after the cessation of hostilities, although the details are unclear. A poet who had the skill and training of a rank, but not the proper familial qualifications received half the honour price that his skill and training otherwise earned.

=== Clientship ===
A member of the property-owning classes could advance himself by becoming a "free client" of a more powerful lord, somewhat akin to the Roman system of clientship. The lord made his client a grant of property (sometimes land, but more usually livestock) for a fixed period of time. The client owed service to his lord, and at the end of the grant period returned the grant with interest. Any increase beyond the agreed interest was his to keep. This allowed for a certain degree of social mobility as an astute free client could increase his wealth until he could afford clients of his own, thus becoming a lord.

A poorer man could become a "base client" by selling a share in his honour price, making his lord entitled to part of any compensation due him. The lord could make him a smaller grant of land or livestock, for which the client paid rent in produce and manual labour. A man could be a base client to several lords simultaneously.

=== Physical injury ===
On account of the structure of early Irish society, all law was essentially civil and offenders had to answer only to the victim or the victim's representative. This is important to point out, as in case of serious injury it is in stark contrast to most modern legal systems.

==== Payment for wounding ====
Although early Irish law recognised a distinction between intentional and unintentional injury, any type of injury was still normally unlawful and requiring compensation. The main exception is injuries received when the victim has gone into a place where an injury is likely. In all other cases, an injurer was responsible for paying a fine. The legal text Bretha Déin Chécht "The Judgments of Dían Cécht" goes into considerable detail in describing the fines based on the location of the wound, the severity, and in some cases the type.

According to that text, the payment was decided by a physician after nine days. Prior to that, the victim was cared for by his family and a physician. Some suggest that the effects of the wound would be clear to a physician at that point if not before. First, either the victim would have died if such was likely, or it would be clear that the patient was in danger. If the first was the case, the injurer had to face punishment for murder, and in the second he had to pay a heavy fine called a crólige báis, "blood-lying of death." If the victim had recovered but his wound was still present, it was measured and a fine paid. Bretha Déin Chécht describes that the wound was measured according to how many grains of a certain plant fit in the wound. The higher the status one was, the smaller the grain used. Thus, there are nine grains mentioned in the text, from a grain of wheat to a bean. If the wound did not heal, and thus the physical blemish was a problem for the victim's honour, further payments were required.

Early Irish law saw certain locations, known as the "twelve doors of the soul" were considered particularly severe. It has been suggested that this is because of the potential for such wounds to turn deadly, although the law texts do not suggest any reason. In such cases, the physician was entitled to a greater share of the fine—one half. Similarly, if the wound is one of "the seven principal bone-breakings," or if it causes constant vomiting or bloody urine the physician also received a greater fee.

==== Sick maintenance ====
If it seemed that the patient would recover but still needed nursing, the injurer was responsible for that. This was known as sick maintenance, rendering variously crólige, folog n-othrusa, folog, or othrus in different texts. Bretha Crólige goes into great detail about this process, describing how the injurer had to find a suitable location and move the victim. Then the injurer had to pay for food for the victim and a retinue—which could be considerable depending on the victim's rank. The injurer also had to provide someone to fulfil the victim's duties while he was incapacitated. He also had to pay a fine for the missed opportunity for procreation if appropriate.

Bretha Crólige also goes into the importance of keeping a proper environment for the victim during his sick-maintenances. Largely this means that anything that might cause loud noise was prohibited in the vicinity. This included fights by men as well as by dogs, the playing of games and even the disciplining of children.

It is clear from the law tracts that the practice of Sick Maintenance was being discarded. Críth Gablach mentions some of what each individual is entitled to while being nursed according to his rank, it also mentions that the practice was no longer in use, and instead, an additional fine encompassed the same provisions the injurer would have had to pay for under sick maintenance. Bretha Crólige does not mention anything about the practice being obsolete. It does mention that certain types of person could not be maintained because of the difficulty in doing so. Thus it was very hard to provision those of the highest rank and obviously impossible to find a substitute to do their work. Certain professionals could similarly be difficult. On the other hand, a number of persons could cause difficulty to the people maintaining the victim. Such troublesome individuals included the insane and women likely to cause trouble for those nursing them.

==== Murder and avoidance of capital punishment ====
Early Ireland has the distinction of being one of the first areas to shun capital punishment. While a murderer might be killed for his/her crime, this was the option of last resort. Instead, the murderer typically had to pay two fines. One is the fixed éraic or cró, that is either a "body fine" or a "wergild", and the other is the Log nEnech, an honour price owed to the kin of the victim that varied according to the status of the kinsman to whom it was owed and the closeness of his relationship to the victim. Should the murderer be unable to pay by himself, his family was normally responsible for paying any amount the murderer could not pay. Should the family be either unable or unwilling to pay, the victim's family took custody of the murderer. At this point, the victim's family had three options. They could await payment, sell the murderer into slavery, or kill the murderer. Even then, the monetary possibilities may have discouraged capital punishment in some cases. In certain cases, though, where the murderer and victim were relatives, capital punishment could not be carried out as it would make the executioner commit fingal or kin-slaying.

Another situation where the murderer could be killed was when the murderer was at large and the fines had not been paid. The victim's family apparently was responsible to launch a blood feud. It is unclear how often capital punishment was carried out in situations where it would be licit without any records other than the legal tracts. It is clear that that punishment could be avoided in most cases.

The origin of this particular legal provision is as unclear as the rest of Irish law. The so-called "Pseudo-Historical Prologue to the Senchas Már", a late introduction to the main collection of Irish law, makes a claim on how this came about. It declares that prior to the coming of St. Patrick, Irish law demanded capital punishment in all cases of murder. Christianity was supposed to preach forgiveness. The two fines are apparently a compromise so that the murderer is both punished and forgiven. It is at least dubious whether or not this is a valid historical account, given the lateness of the story (originating hundreds of years after Patrick's time).

=== Kinship ===
Early Irish law recognised a number of degrees of agnatic kinship, based on a belief that there was a common male ancestor. The closest kin group that is defined is gelfine (bright-kin)—descendants of a common grandfather (including the grandfather's relationships to his descendants and his children). This is followed by the derbfine (certain-kin)—descendants of a common great-grandfather, iarfine (after-kin)—descendants of a common great-great-grandfather, and the indfine (end-kin), all of which contain the old Irish word for kin or family, fine. The derbfine is, by far, the kin-group most commonly mentioned.

The leader of the kin group was known either as ágae fine (pillar of the family) or cenn fine (head [literally] of the family). He apparently was a senior member selected from the kin group based on various qualifications. One of his main duties was to take responsibility for members of the kin-group, acting as a surety for some of the actions of members, making sure debts are paid (including for murder). If the member could not be made to pay, the fee was normally paid by members of the kin group. He was also responsible for unmarried women after the death of their fathers.

As mentioned above, the actions of a member could require other kin to pay a fine. In certain cases, the kin-group could refuse liabilities, although in some cases only after they been proclaimed as a non-member, which might occur if the member did not carry out his responsibilities to the kin. One particularly heinous crime in early Irish law was fingal (kin-slaying) because it was against a group that had some right to trust. The killer had to give up their kin-land but was still liable for fines incurred by other members of the kin. An undutiful son might also be excluded from certain kin rights as well, especially as sons of a living father generally did not have significant rights of legal actions except as permitted by the father.

==== Inheritance ====
Early Ireland practised partitive inheritance whereby each of the sons received equal portions, and any grandsons whose father predeceased their grandfather equally split their father's portion. When the Normans entered Ireland and saw the Irish practice they called it gavelkind, the Jute inheritance in Kent to which it seemed similar. Early Irish law typically did not distinguish between "legitimate" and "illegitimate" children, so any recognised, even those of concubines, received a portion. On the other hand, disobedient sons were automatically excluded. In addition, adopted children could receive a portion of kin land, though status as an inheritor and the inheritance amount had to be explicitly stipulated.

The division of land is somewhat obscure. One maxim suggests that the youngest son divided the land into equal parts. The eldest chose first, followed by the second and so on until the youngest received the remaining land. The intent was to make the division of land equal. Other laws suggested that the eldest son had automatic claims to the buildings. There are some hints that this only happened if a younger son challenged a division. The normal practice was that the eldest son both divided and chose first, but had to divide equally. More rarely, a father might divide the land for his sons in his lifetime.

While a daughter with brothers did not normally receive a portion of the inheritance in land, she could inherit movable property. In a case where there are no sons, some of the law tracts allow the daughter to inherit a limited portion. Unless her husband was a foreigner to the túath and had no land of his own, the land did not descend to her sons but instead went to the other members of her agnatic kin group. There was apparently pressure for a woman with land to marry a relative to keep the land within the kin group.

Finally, if a man died with no children, the property was distributed between his nearest kin—first the descendants of his father, and if there were no such descendants, then between the descendants of his grandfather, and so on. Any extra land that daughters could not inherit because of female inheritance limits also went to the wider kin. The head of a kin group was entitled to extra property since he was liable for debts a kinsman could not pay.

==== Land rights of kin ====
The potential for inheritance by even distant kin meant that, in Early Irish law, those kin all had some sort of right in the land. Land that had been inherited was known as finntiu (kin-land). Certain rights of use of land by the owner's kin seem to have existed. Moreover, it was possible that land could be redistributed if a certain branch of the family had few descendants and hence larger shares in the land per person. In such a case, even some more distant cousins could acquire the land, though they benefited less than closer kin. Apparently because of these potential claims it could apparently be difficult to alienate kin-land. Even when selling land that an individual had acquired separately from an inheritance, a portion went to his kin.

== Legal theory ==
=== Changes in the legal system ===
Ireland had no regular central authority capable of making new law and hence the Brehon laws were entirely in the hands of the jurists. As such, some early scholars felt that the legal system was essentially unchanging and archaic. More recently scholars have noticed that some methods of change were laid out within the Brehon laws. In particular, Cóic Conara Fugill mentions five bases on which a judge must base judgment, and at least three offer some room for change: fásach (legal maxim), cosmailius (legal analogy), and aicned (natural law) (the other two are roscad, a type of legal verse jurists were trained to create to mark a statement made by someone who knows the law and teistimin (scriptural testimony)). It has not yet been studied in detail how exactly these three innovative methods were used.

=== Maxims ===
The use and application of maxims is clearly a location where the principles of Irish law could be recorded. Any number of maxims may be found within the Early Irish Laws and perhaps the reason why we are unable to derive a coherent theory of law from them is that there are a great many different topics. Some do seem to represent a legal theory, such as the maxim in Bechbretha that "no-one is obliged to give something to another for nothing" and that in Bretha Crólige that "the misdeed of the guilty should not affect the innocent". These maxims do say more than one might think since legal systems often have problems balancing the interests of all. The majority of maxims treat with more specific problems. The main problem with our understanding of maxims is that while one law text tells us that they were used as a basis of judgment we know little else about them; we do not even know how exactly maxims could be used for judgment. A further complication is that we know very little about the origin of maxims (or even what the jurists thought was the origin) and similarly we do not know whether jurists were introducing new maxims regularly or whether all maxims were supposed to be from time immemorial.

=== Natural law ===
Early Irish law mentions in a number of places recht aicned or natural law. This is a concept apparently borrowed from, or at least akin with, European legal theory, and reflects a type of law that is universal and may be determined by reason and observation of natural action. Neil McLeod identifies concepts that law must accord with: fír (truth) and dliged (right or entitlement). These two terms occur frequently, though Irish law never strictly defines them. Similarly, the term córus (law in accordance with proper order) occurs in some places, and even in the titles of certain texts. The laws tell stories of how truth could apparently cure a person and falsehood could cause blisters. These were two very real concepts to the jurists and the value of a given judgment with respect to them was apparently ascertainable. McLeod has also suggested that most of the specific laws mentioned have passed the test of time and thus their truth has been confirmed, while other provisions are justified in other ways because they are younger and have not been tested over time.

== Legal procedure ==
The early Irish laws are devoid of a state-centred enforcement mechanism and at least some of the judges were outside the state apparatus. This did not mean that the laws were ineffective, rather the methods of enforcement of legal procedures worked in such a way to fit with the conditions of society.

=== Suretyship ===
Sureties were the prime enforcers in early Irish law. They were not government officials, but rather sureties who were appointed to enforce a contract or other legal relationship. Berad Airechta, the law tract that deals most with sureties, offers formulaic speeches the contractors may have recited ceremonially to appoint sureties and make the sureties swear to perform their duties properly. In addition to sureties appointed for specific contracts, relatives might be expected to act as sureties in cases where they were not specifically bound. There is also evidence that most sureties were either relatives or lords of the contractor.

Three types of sureties appear in Irish law. The naidm (and in earlier texts macc) refers to a surety who is expected to enforce payment from the contractor. Apparently, in standard contracts two naidmain (plural of naidm) were appointed by each party. The word naidm might also refer to the "binding" of a contract. If the contractor whom he is appointed for defaults it is the naidms responsibility to attempt to make the contractor pay. If he does not act or does not put in sufficient effort he loses his honour price. In attempting to extract payment, the naidm had a wide range of powers. He might distrain the contractor's property, imprison or even violently attack the contractor. Apparently, as with witnessing, someone could not be a naidm to a contract worth more than his honour-price.

The ráth is generally referred to as a paying surety. Should the contractor default, the ráth had to pay the debt from his own property. He could then attempt to extract the money from the contract. Assumedly, the ráth only paid if the naidm was unable to make the debtor pay. Since acting as a ráth could mean a financial loss that might not be repaid, the law tracts apparently see the position as dangerous, as one of three "dark things of the world." The ráth, like other sureties, were paid a fee when hired, which potentially made up for the risk they undertook. A person could not act as a ráth in contracts worth more than his honour-price, though it was possible that one might act as a ráth for only part of a contract, in which case they were responsible for payment only up to their honour-price.

Finally, the aitire is a surety who became a hostage in the case of a default. Once the hostage was in captivity, the debtor had ten days to pay the debt to have the hostage released. If the hostage was not released by then, expenses to the debtor could become exorbitant. The aitire had to pay his own ransom by paying his body price, which was expensive, and the debtor had to pay twice that fee plus the surety's honour price. The aitire could enforce the debt to him by himself.

== Relationship to the church and church law ==
Brehon law was produced in the vernacular language by a group of professional jurists. The exact relationship of those jurists to the church is subject to considerable debate. Brehon law at times was at odds with and at times influenced by Irish canon law.

=== Early Christianity in Ireland ===
The introduction of Christianity in Ireland dates to sometime before the 5th century, presumably through interactions with Roman Britain, although evidence also exists of early Christian influences stemming from the Coptic Orthodox Church in Egypt. Celtic Christianity practices in the Early Middle Ages in Ireland differed considerably from mainstream European Christianity and were strongly monastic in nature. The Synod of Ráth Breasail was a synod of the Catholic Church in Ireland that took place in Ireland in 1111 and marked the transition of the Irish church from a monastic to a diocesan and parish-based church. This synod was partly a response to Viking raids on Ireland which began around the start of the 9th century, and weakened the Irish church, producing a decline in the acceptance of Christian religious standards. As the invading raids of the Danes became less frequent, there was a revival of religious education, which prepared the way for the religious reforms of the 12th century. The Anglo-Norman invasion of Ireland in the 12th century had a major impact on Irish Christianity, increasing the de facto ability of the Holy See to regulate Christianity in Ireland.

=== Vernacular church law ===
A number of law tracts that originated from the church were written in Old Irish. The most famous of these is Cáin Adomnáin, which was apparently created in 697 under the influence of Adomnán and ratified by a number of ecclesiastics and kings whose names appear in the text. The idea of the law was apparently to supplement the punishments of Brehon law for crimes against women, children, and clerics. In some ways it follows the ideas embodied in Brehon law although there are differences; for instance, it uses capital punishment, which Brehon law avoids.

=== Canon law ===
More contradictions exist with Latin Canon Law, such as in the Collectio canonum Hibernensis (Irish Collection of Canons), than with Vernacular Church law. Brehon law allows polygyny (albeit while citing the authority of the Old Testament) and divorce, among other actions that canon law expressly forbids.

At the same time, it is clear that the two legal systems have borrowed from each other. Much Latin terminology has entered into Old Irish and into the legal system, such as a type of witness teist from Latin testis. The Collectio Canonum Hibernensis also borrows terms found in Brehon law such as rata from Old Irish rath, a type of surety. The latter also suggests more substantive borrowing from Brehon Law into canon law.

There are a number of places where it is clear that law was borrowed in one direction or another. Large sections on the Church have been translated wholesale from the Collectio Canonum Hibernensis into a section of the Law tract Bretha Nemed. Other overlaps have been suggested, in many cases where biblical references seem to appear in the Brehon law. Where both texts cite the same rule, it is not always clear which came up with the rule first. In addition to substantive law, other legal aspects appear in both, such as the propensity towards the use of analogy.

=== Relationship of jurists with the church ===
The above similarities have led scholars to ask what relationship did Brehons have with clerics. Some scholars, known as anti-nativists, have suggested that the Brehons were nothing more than clerics who had training in secular law. In addition to the similarities and evidence of borrowing from Canon law and the Bible, scholars who hold this position ask how any non-Clerics could have been sufficiently literate at this period to create the texts. Other scholars, known as nativists, have asked how the differences could arise if the authors of canon and secular law were indeed the same.

== Legal texts ==
Scholars have found over 100 distinct texts, ranging from complete texts through various degrees of partial preservation—and in some cases only as a name in a list, and even, in one case, a tract that scholars have decided must have existed. Almost all of the secular legal texts existing in various manuscripts have been printed in D.A. Binchy's six-volume Corpus Iuris Hibernici and a few texts left out of that work made it into another book intended as a companion to the Corpus Iuris Hibernici.

=== Senchas Már ===
A number of the legal texts may be categorised together on account of related authorship. The largest such grouping is the Senchas Már, a collection of at least 47 separate tracts compiled into a single group sometime in the 8th century, though individual tracts vary in date. These tracts were almost certainly written by a variety of authors, though some suggest that certain authors wrote more than one of the included tracts. The collection was apparently made somewhere in the north midlands. The Senchas Már tracts have been subjected to the greatest amount of glossing and commentary in later manuscripts. Moreover, one of the few examples of Old Irish glossing has been given to the various texts of Senchas Már. These glosses were apparently made in Munster.

The text has been arranged into thirds; three was apparently an important number to the Irish. A number of laws were grouped into threes, called triads—a practice also common in the Welsh. One scholar has recently suggested that there were a number of groups of six including one single tract, generally from the first third, two contiguous tracts generally in the second third, and three contiguous tracts from the third third. Each group of six is theorised as related to each other in various ways. The prologue ascribes the authorship of the book to a committee of nine appointed by St Patrick to revise the laws. It was composed of three kings, three bishops, and three professors of literature, poetry, and law. Chief among the latter was Dubthach. It became his duty to give a historical retrospect, and in doing so he exhibited "all the judgments of true nature which the Holy Ghost had spoken from the first occupation of this island down to the reception of the faith. What did not clash with the word of God in the written law and in the New Testament and with the consciences of believers was confirmed in the laws of the brehons by Patrick and by the ecclesiastics and chieftains of Ireland. This is the Senchus Mor."

=== Nemed texts ===
In addition to the school that produced the Senchas Már, scholars have detected a few other legal schools that produced texts. The next most fully formed is the Nemed or Bretha Nemed school, named after two of the texts it produced. This school, which has been referred to as poetico-legal, apparently was located in Munster, based on references to the King of Munster and two monasteries in Munster.

==== Bretha Nemed Toísech and Bretha Nemed Déidenach ====
These two texts, the "First Judgment of Privileged Ones" and the "Final Judgment of Privileged Ones" are the later scribal names of two texts are written primarily in the obscure roscad style of poetry. The first describes the roles and status of the church, poets and various other professionals. The final primarily with the status and duties of poets although it contains other material as well. The first is also one of the few early texts scholars have assigned an author to, namely three brothers, hua Búirecháin, who are a bishop, a poet, and a judge.

==== Uraicecht Becc ====
The Uraicecht Becc ("Small primer") is a text on status and has the greatest breadth in coverage, including not only commoners, kings, churchmen and poets, but also a variety of other professional groups, including judges. It does not go into as much detail for each group and level as do other status tracts.

=== Other texts ===
A number of other texts have not been grouped together as coming from either the same author or from the same school. This doesn't mean no affiliation for authors of other texts exists, only that scholars have not been able to find them.

==== Berrad Airechta ====
Literally Shearing of the Court, Fergus Kelly suggests that this might mean more loosely "court summary" or "synopsis of court procedure." The text deals with a number of topics for judicial procedure, but most importantly on the role of the various types of sureties. Interesting, it covers the ways that sureties were appointed to their duties, and hence it is informative on the way contracts were created.

==== Críth Gablach ====
"Branched Purchase" is the title of what is perhaps the most well-known tract on status and certainly the most accessible, as a modern printed edition (though not a translation) has been published by the Dublin Institute for Advanced Studies. The text goes into details on the grades of commoners and nobility: what property should they own, how large should their house be, how should their clientship be arranged. The text presents a schema that could not have been used in actuality. For instance, it includes clientship information for even the highest nobility, who would not have acted as clients. The text also presents a certain amount of interesting information on the duties of a king.

In addition to the main text, a poem immediately follows in the manuscript, but there has been debate as to whether this is actually a part of the tract.

==== Di Astud Chor ====
A two-part text, On the Binding of Contracts, deals with when contracts are binding and when they are not. The first section deals with general rules regarding when contracts are binding, including an analogy to the fact that Adam's trade of an apple for access to the Garden of Eden was valid even though it was an uneven contract because Adam knew it was such. The second half deals with cases in which a contract may be overturned. The tract is also interesting because it is a collection of material from varying dates and places and as such much more uneven in content than other tracts.

==== Uraicecht na Ríar ====
The "Primer of Stipulations" is a text on the status of poets. It includes information on compensation based on status, but it also includes information about the poetic craft such as the number of type of positions one must have to be a certain grade. It also describes the difference between a fili and a bard.

=== Later texts ===
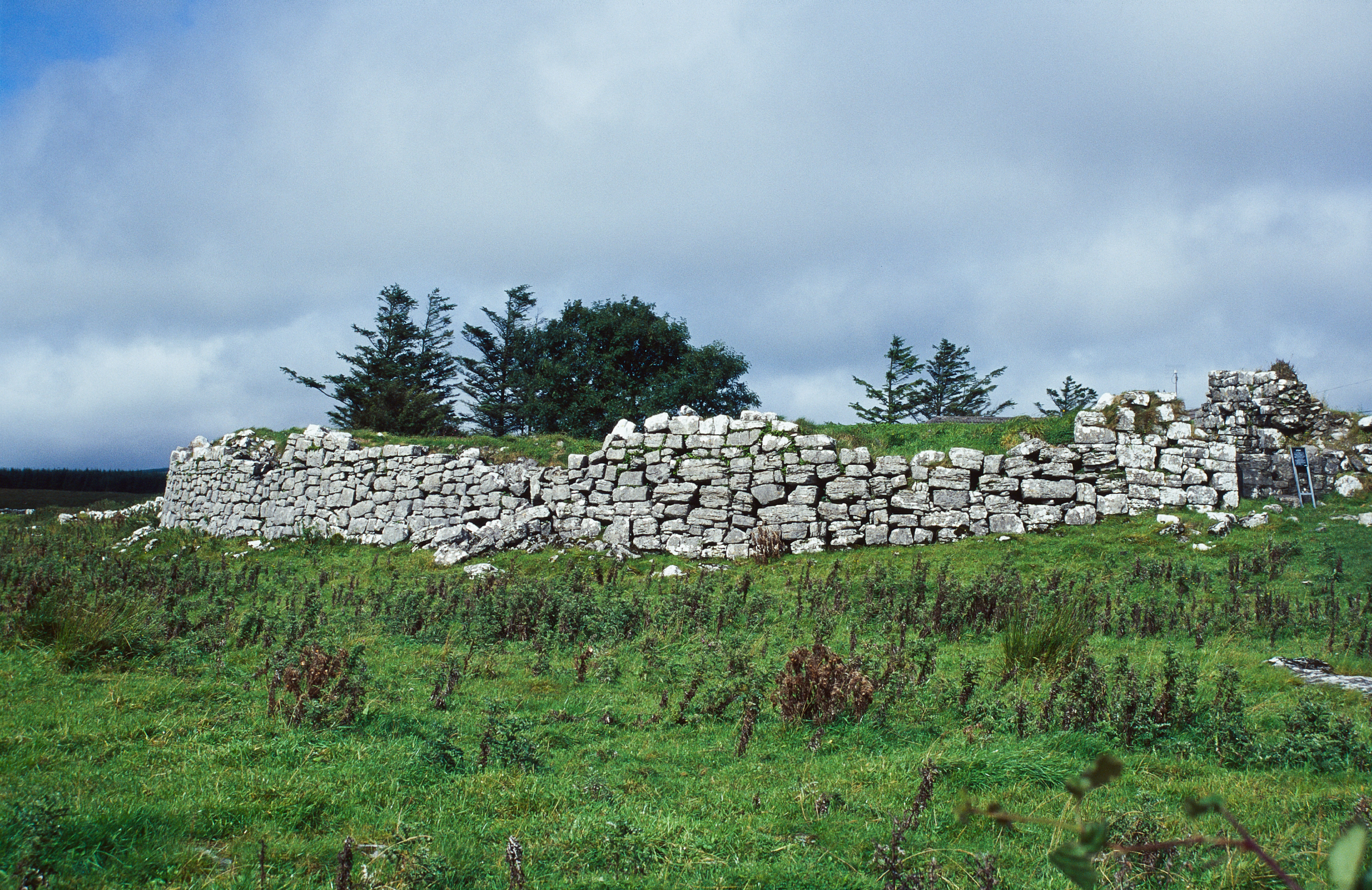
Ruins of the O'Davoren law school at Cahermacnaghten, County Clare, which was occupied in the later Middle Ages

While most of the legal tracts were composed during the 7th and 8th centuries, there were some independent tracts, as well as a significant amount of glossing and commentary, often written within a century of when some of the tracts were composed.

==== Glosses and commentary ====
The most voluminous legal material written after the 8th century takes the form of notes upon that earlier material. There have been numerous questions about the degree to which such glossators understood the material they worked on. It is also possible that in some cases jurists used the earlier material for a legitimate method of explaining how the law had come to work. This material takes two main forms: glossing between the lines of a text, and mini texts that begin with a quote from earlier legal material.

O'Davoren's Glossary, an early modern glossary of Old Irish, preserves many quotes from early Irish legal texts. In many cases, it is the only text that includes certain quotes as well as information about certain whole law tracts. Its primary focus is to list and define certain words, particularly legal terms, and as such has provided significant help in understanding the oldest laws.

==== Later legal tracts ====
While the majority of legal texts were written before the 9th century, a few were written later. The Middle Irish text, The Distribution of Cró and Dibad deals with extracting fines from a killer and dividing a dead man's property. Additionally, the legal text Cóic Conara Fugill (the Five Paths of Judgment) was originally written during the earliest period but received a number of subsequent recensions afterwards. The text deals with how a court case should proceed based on the substance of the intended argument. It is not clear what distinctions are made in this text.

=== Case law ===
Early Irish Law is almost completely lacking in case law. What exists are a few brief references in a number of texts, both legal and non-legal, which reference the laws in action. For instance Bechbretha mentions the case of a king who lost his throne because he was blinded by a bee. Additionally, the Latin Life of St. Columba refers to the case of a man who killed another and the subsequent punishment he was to endure.

== Decline of the Brehon laws ==
The first attempt to encroach on Brehon law in Ireland came in 1155 when the English pope Adrian IV issued the papal bull Laudabiliter, which sanctioned the Norman Invasion of Ireland. Following the Norman invasion (from 1171), areas under Anglo-Norman control were subject to English law. One of the first changes came with the Synod of Cashel in 1172, which required single marriages to partners that were not closely related, and exempted clergy from paying their share of a family's eraic payments.

Henry II, who created the Lordship of Ireland, was also a legal reformer within his empire, and started to centralise the administration of justice and abolish local customary laws. Strongbow was assigned large parts of Leinster in 1170 under the Brehon law by his new father-in-law Dermot McMurrough that were then regranted by Henry. Landowners such as the Earl of Kildare could claim a continuous title that just predated the Lordship itself.

In the centuries that followed, a cultural and military "Gaelic revival" eventually came to cover the larger portion of the island. The majority of Norman barons eventually adopted Irish culture and language, married in with the native Irish, and adopted Irish legal custom. Outside of the English controlled Pale around Dublin, and some notable areas of joint tradition in northern and eastern Munster, Brehon law became the de facto legal writ.

Nevertheless, the Brehon Laws could never be adopted on an official basis by the English-controlled government of the Lordship of Ireland, although some modernised concepts have been readopted in the laws of the Republic of Ireland. The imposition of the Statutes of Kilkenny in 1367 and the policy of Surrender and regrant effectively outlawed Brehon Law.

Vestigial rights have been recognised in recent Irish case law, in reference to the survival of Brehon law-governed customary local fishery rights in Tyrconnell, but these also amounted to an easement under Common Law.

The Tudor conquest of Ireland in the mid-16th century, ending in the Nine Years' War (1594–1603) paved the way for the suppression of Brehon law. The extension of English law into Ulster became possible and led in part to the Flight of the Earls in 1607.

Elements of Brehon law operated in dwindling remnants in the Gaeltacht in the west of Ireland and in the Scottish Isles, notable on the isle of Lewis. On Lewis, the chiefs of the Morrison clan (earlier, Clann mhic Amhlaigh (Macaulays) of Uig in Lewis, and Sliochd a' Bhreitheimh, later Morrison) continued to hold office as hereditary brieves (Scots for bretheamh or brehon) or judges of the MacLeod clan of Lewis into the 17th century.

... the location of the Morisons was at Ness in Lewis, where the head of the Clan was Britheamh or Hereditary Judge long before Fifeshire colonists were heard of. It is not likely, as the late Captain Thomas put it, that any of the Brieves ever understood a word of English, and as the Scotch laws were never translated into Gaelic, it seems that the native or Brehon Laws must have been administered in this part of Scotland as late as the 17th century.

— Dan Iain Ghobha: The poems of John Morison, cit. – Arch. Scot., Vol. V., p. 366

The last Morrison to exercise the office was put down with Letter of Fire and Sword in about 1619. It is probable that it was the last operative in Lewis by about 1595 or so. See the later history of Clan Morrison.

== Fictional references and Ulster cycle of legends ==
The Brehon laws play a large role in the Sister Fidelma series of historical (7th century AD) crime books by Peter Tremayne, and in those of Cora Harrison's Mara, Brehon (investigating judge) of the Burren (early 16th century). They are also the underlying principles seen in such Irish saga as Táin Bó Flidhais and Táin Bó Cuailnge

== March law ==
March law was a set of laws and customs obtaining in the border areas of the Lordship of Ireland during the Middle Ages. These regions were ruled by Anglo-Irish lords between The Pale, which was the portion of Ireland ruled directly by the English crown, and Gaelic Ireland, which was still under the rule of native kings. It came into being in the late 13th century, when King Edward I of England drained resources from Ireland to fund his conquest of Wales and his wars in Scotland. Since the two areas were often intermingled in the border regions, as in the Wicklow Mountains, the applicability and content of march law varied widely.

== See also ==
- Category:Customary legal systems
- Kritarchy
- William Ó Deorádhain (15th century), Professor of Jurisprudence
