= Brehon =

Historic mediative and judicial role in Gaelic culture

Brehon (Irish: breitheamh, pronounced [ˈbʲɾʲɛhəw]) is a term for a historical arbitration, mediative, and judicial role in Gaelic culture. Brehons were part of the system of Early Irish law, which was also simply called "Brehon law". Brehons were judges, close in importance to the chiefs.

== History ==
Ireland's indigenous system of law dates from the Iron Age. Known as Brehon law, it developed from customs which had been passed on orally from one generation to the next. Brehon law was administered by Brehons. They were similar to judges, though their role was closer to that of arbitrators. Their task was to preserve and interpret the law.

In the history of the Kingdom of Dublin, the Gaelic Irish recaptured the city from the Norse Vikings after the Battle of Tara. Dublin was officially founded in 988 when the Norse King Glúniairn first recognised Máel Sechnaill mac Domnaill as the High King of Ireland, he also agreed to pay taxes and accept Brehon law.

A Megalithic site exists in Rathfarnham, County Dublin, known as Brehon's Chair or Druid's Table. It is believed to be the seat of judgment in prehistoric times, a king of outdoors court.

The brehons of ancient Ireland were wise individuals who memorised and applied the laws to settle disputes among members of an extended family. Some brehons were attached to clans, and were allotted a portion of land for their support. Others lived independently by their profession. They were recognised as a professional class apart from druids and bards, and became, by custom, to a large extent hereditary. The term "bard" is associated with a Brehon family of poets, called Mac an Bháird (Son of the Bard). They were one of the descendants of the ancient tribes of Soghain in the Kingdom of Uí Maine.

In ancient Ireland, Brehons, as part of the leading members of society, would take part in an event which took place every three years on Samhain known as Feis Teamhrach (Festival of Tara) in the House of the Banquets (Teach Moidhchuarta) at the Hill of Tara. The assembly was also originally referred to as an Aonach in prehistoric times. It was a national event with the purpose of resolving any regional disputes regarding title to rank, property and privilege. They would be settled by the Brehons, and all annals and records would be carefully noted and entered by the Ard Ollams in the official records. The event was founded in a very early period, and lasted until 560 AD when the final assembly was held by King Dermot, son of Fergus.

The preparatory course of study extended over some twenty years. The Brehon laws were originally composed in poetic verse to aid memorisation. Brehons were liable for damages if their rulings were incorrect, illegal or unjust. When one brehon had adjudicated on a matter submitted to him, there could be no appeal to another Brehon of the same rank; but there might be an appeal to a higher court, provided the appellant gave security.

While originating in oral legal history, Brehons enacted the first piece of copyright legislation in relation to written text in world legal history, circa 561 AD between Saint Colmcille and Saint Finian over the authorship of a manuscript called "St Jerome's Psalter".

One of the main responsibilities of a Brehon was to record the genealogies of the people. Amongst notable Brehons associated with recording genealogies was the Clan Mac Fhirbhisigh. Dubhaltach Mac Fhirbhisigh produced Leabhar na nGenealach, also the abridgment version Cuimre na nGenealach and Great Book of Lecan. The genealogist would also be referred to in old Irish as a Seanchaidhe. The basic family unit under brehon law in ancient Ireland was defined as Derbfine, or "True Kin" in English Another Brehon family noted for recording genealogies were the Ó Cléirigh, such as Mícheál Ó Cléirigh, the author of the Annals of the Four Masters.

== The ancient tree laws (Bretha Comaithchesa) ==
In Irish mythology the Mother Goddess Danu symbolically represented the land, her consort is Bilé who was the god of Dead and the Otherworld. The sacred tree was seen as a doorway into the otherworld; the roots of the tree go down into realm of the sídhe of the mound, while the tree branches reached to the celestial skies above. Bilé returns once a year from the veil of the Otherworld to be reunited with the goddesses of the land, he returns in the form of a sacred tree (Bilé Uisnigh or Craeb Uisnig) at Bealtaine, it was one of the five sacred trees of Ireland. The word Bilé translates from old Irish to sacred tree and it represents an Irish god equivalent to the Celtic god of Belenus, in Milesian myth the ancestor of the Gaels was called Bilé as well, he was the father of Milesius and king of Galicia.

In the Brehon Law manuscript Bretha Comaithchesa or "Laws of the Neighbourhood" it describes the earliest constructed Christian church in Ireland as being referred to as a Dairthech or oak church Kings and Chiefs inaugurated and even during penal times children were thought lessons in the secret hedge schools, according to the tradition under the branches of an overhanging tree, usually the teacher was a wandering bard who had received his formal training from the then outlawed and extinct bardic schools. One of the most noted bards to establish and teach in a hedge school was the famous Aisling poet Eoghan Rua Ó Súilleabháin.

In the Bretha Comaithchesa, the Brehon Laws imposed heavy fines for the destruction of trees based on a hierarchical classification of punishment depending on the importance of the tree. The seven most important trees which were categorised in the highest classification Airig Fedo for protection were the oak, scot pine, hazel, ash, yew, apple and the holly. These trees were all referred to as "the Chieftains of the woods" and any damage inflected on them would result in the most severe punishment, the same kind of penalty that would be imposed upon a person who was found guilty of killing the Noblest Chieftain (person). As of 2013, Ireland is among the countries with the least woodland cover in the whole of Europe; only 11% of the island is covered by trees and, the vast majority being conifers, most are planted for purely economic or farming purposes rather than unfettered wild wooded oak forests.

== The Brehon laws and Anglo-Norman invasion of 1169 ==
The first real effort to encroach on the Irish laws came with the Anglo Norman invasion in the 12th century, led by Richard de Clare, 2nd Earl of Pembroke, commonly known as 'Strongbow'. The Normans also claimed they were issued with the Laudabiliter by Pope Adrian IV which gave official Vatican approval for the Anglo-Normans to invade and forcefully bring the native Irish Christian church under the jurisdiction of Holy See of Rome.

The invasion came about due to the deposed King of Leinster, Diarmait Mac Murchada enlisting the help from King Henry II England in order to recover his kingdom in 1167. Diarmait Mac Murchada was deposed by the High King of Ireland, Ruaidrí Ua Conchobair (Rory O' Connor) for the abduction of Derbforgaill, the wife of King of Breifne, Tiernan O'Rourke. Ultimately Diarmait Mac Murchada enlisted the military support of the Earl of Pembroke (nicknamed "Strongbow") in order to regain his title.

A conflict occurred between the native Brehon laws and the newly imposed Norman laws over who should be the successor to Diarmait Mac Murchada as King of Leinster. After the King died, the Brehon laws recognised his eldest son Domhnall Caomhánach mac Murchada through the Kings derbfine, he was the chosen Tánaist to succeed him as the king of Leinster, in keeping with the laws of Tanistry. The Norman laws however supported the Anglo-Norman leader Strongbow claim as the successor Diarmait Mac Murchada on the basis that he was married to the king's daughter Aoife Mac Murchada. Strongbow tried to present the argument that he should inherit the title through his wife bloodlines.

== Law of the Tanistry ==
The ancient law of succession or Tanistry has its origins in Brehon law. It was a Gaelic custom where legally the eldest son (Tánaiste) succeeded his father to exclusion of all collateral claimants. In terms of land inheritance it was a similar system to Gavelkind in ancient Ireland. In the case of failure of the presumptive heir or eldest to the throne, other sons were regarded as righdhamhua which means "king material" or "King in the making".

When selecting a capable king for Dál Riada, Saint Columba acted in accordance with the Law of the Tanistry when he deselected the then Tánaiste, a feeble prince, Eoganán in favour of his younger brother Áedhán, both sons of Gabrán mac Domangairt. Áedhán had trained at the institute of Iona. Saint Columba sat him on the "stone of fate", and he solemnly anointed him King of the Scottish Dal Riada. It was said to be the first known example of an ordination in Britain and Ireland.

== Bretha Dein Chécht (judgment of Dian Cecht) ==
Bretha Déin Chécht is an ancient medical law tract first appeared in Senchas Már. It relates to a judgment made by Dian Cecht, a physician to the Tuatha Dé Danann. It offers a detailed account of compensations for wounding depending on the nature of the injury, its severity and what part of the body. Much of the translation work of this old Irish manuscript is attributed to the 20th-century scholar D.A. Binchy, who first published his findings in the Eriu journal.

In pre-Christian Irish legend, the first ever hospital was Bhrionbherg (House of Sorrows), set up by Macha Mong Ruadh, a legendary Irish queen, at Emain Macha (Navan Fort), an ancient ruler of the five Kingdoms of Tara and also the daughter of Áed Rúad. Other hospitals spread to all the other kingdoms; these institutes would later be carried on by monks, as parts of monasteries during the Christian times. Brehon law laid down a medical code of ethics on regulations and management for treatment of the sick and wounded, and also details of patient entitlements, compensations and fees.

Bretha Crólige (Binchy, 1938) was also part of this law tract; it highlights obligations in the event of an injury to person. The cost of maintenance and entitlements to the injured party are carefully laid out in the tract. This particular law tract highlighted the fact that Druids' sick maintenance was exactly the same as a Bóaire (ordinary freeman), regardless of status.

== Cain Aigillne ==
Cain Aigillne deals with a system of laws in regards to clientship and livestock farming. Covered in this manuscript is the treatment of cattle and also of domestic animals. The law tract describes a wide variety of domestic pet animals that people kept in pre-Christian Ireland, many would be deemed as unconventional domestic pets to keep nowadays, the list included crows, ravens, cranes, badgers, wolves, foxes and others.

Early Irish literature and Brehon law depicts a tenderness towards animals was characteristic of Irish people. When cattle were taken on a long journey, they were fed at intermediate stations along the route with food and water. Brehon laws also had penalties for injury or theft offences against domestic animals such as cats, dogs, cattle and horses.

According to Senchas Mor, the third most popular pet in pre-Christian Ireland after cats and dogs was the crane (Peata Corr). In pagan times, the druids saw cranes as the heavenly transporters of the human soul to isles in the west. Some suggest fires were lit under a migration flight path of the now extinct in Ireland, Grús at Dun Aonghasa. The fort is associated with the Aengus the foster son of Midir who is said to have owned three mystical magical cranes.

This pre-Christian custom of adopting unusual native animals as pets was carried on by some of the Irish abbots into the Christian age. Saint Columba was also commonly known as the "crane cleric" as he kept a pet crane in his home on the Island of Iona, In the Book of Kells there is a depiction of a bald red patch on a crane's crown. Saint Ciarán of Clonmacnoise owned a pet fox (sionnach), Saint Brendan of Clonfert had a pet raven (préchán), Saint Brigid adopted and offered sanctuary to a boar, Saint Colman mac Duagh had a pet rooster that also served as an alarm clock and Saint Colman of Templeshambo owned a flock of sacred ducks, that were so tame they came and went at his call.

== Cai of the Fair judgment ==
Numerous myths associated with different invaders in Irish mythology exist as to the origins of Brehon Law. In Milesian folklore, The Scholar's Primer describes the first Brehon or lawgiver as being Caí Caínbrethach ("Fair-judgment"), he fostered and was a mentor to a Son of Mil known as Amorghain Glúngheal, who later would become Chief Ollamh of Ireland and he also was said to be the 72nd disciple of the school of Fénius Farsaid. Caí in legend, first arrived in Ireland in the company of the Mil Espaine on board a ship, during the Milesian conquest of Ireland.

The word Cáin in old Irish translates to "law" in English. Some of the earliest Brehon or Gaelic legislation was associated with the word such as Cáin Lanamna (Law of Couples) or Cáin Adomnáin (Law of Innocents), a Christian law passed by the Synod of Birr in the ancient Territory of Eile. Brehon law came under two categories, Cáin and Urradas. Cáin Law broadly applied to entire tribes, regions, all under a High King. Urradas law was at a more local level.

The character known as Kay in Medieval Welsh text is said to be based on Caí Caínbrethach.

== Cetharslicht Athgabdla ==
The first volume of The Law of Distress (Athgabdla) was published in a Harleian Manuscript in 1865 and the second in 1869. It deals with ancient legal issues of Seizure by distraint of property for the satisfaction of debt, also laws related fosterage, tenure and social connections.

In the law tract Cetharslicht Athgabdla, it states that three noble tribes passed a judgment at a Dál-Criche (territorial assembly) and divided Ireland between them. A Dál was similar to an Aonach, in that it refers to a ritual annual gathering of legislators at a fixed site of ceremonial importance in order, to among other rituals, collectively pass laws. In Connacht the most famous of these sites was in Cruachan near Tulsk, site of the kings of Connacht, it contains a large number of Ráth, Barrows, Mounds and Earthworks. In Old Irish the word "Dál" means assembly or conferring, for example in its modern Irish form, Dáil Éireann translates to Assembly of Ireland. Dál was also associated with the old Irish word of Tulach (Hillock), which represented the place where ancient druidic ceremonial gatherings took place, it was usually a burial mound. Some place names derive from the word, such as Tullamore, Tullow or Tullynadal (Tulach na dála) in Donegal which translates as "a mustering place".

Numerous categories or levels of assembly, at which laws were passed existed in ancient Ireland, the highest was the Feis Temrach at Tara (national level), Aonach (national or regional), Dál (Túath Sept Nobles), Cuirmtig (Túath members) and finally a Tocomra, where a Túath elected their own Taoiseach and Tánaiste. The main purpose of these gatherings was to promulgate and reaffirm the laws. The Chief Ollamh of Ireland coordinated the Feis at Tara, Ard Ollamh at Regional and Ollamh at a Tuath level.

The earliest reference in the Senchas Már to the reading of the law of Athgabdla at an assembly, took place at the Hill of Uisneach, just before the eve of Bealtaine about a hundred years before the birth of Christ, a uniform law of distraint passed for the whole of Ireland was adopted on the motion of Sen, son of Aigé. This did not prevent the gatherings at Uisneach from being for ages celebrated for gaiety and amusement.

== Maeltine Mor Brethach (the great judgment) ==
Its unknown when the first rudiments of Brehon Law were first practised, some suggest as far back as the Iron Age. With it being orally practised, not many documented writings were produced prior to the Christian age. Some information was later passed on and translated or pieced together from the oldest surviving manuscripts by the endeavours of Christian Monks, much of it was in the form of myth and poetry.

One of the earliest mythical references to a judgment of a Brehon was following the second Battle of Moytura. The then-king of the Tuatha de Danann, Lugh, consulted with Maeltine, his Brehon on the capture of Bres, ex-king and a defector to the Formorians. Lugh agreed to spare Bris's life, if he ensured that Irish cows give milk in abundance, by teaching the people of the Tuatha de Danann agriculture.

The second Battle of Moytura was not the first documented mythical judgment by Brehon. According to Lebor Gabála the first-ever recorded case involved a dispute between Partholón and his adulterous wife, Dealgnaid; a Brehon was said to have adjudicated a settlement between both parties.

== Morann's Collar ==
The Lebor Gabála Érenn describes a famous mythical Brehon judge known as Morann Mac Máin (son of Cairbre Cinnchait), who was the Chief Ollam to High King Feradach Finnfechtnach. Morann would wear a Brehon sín or collar, which was said to contract around his neck when he gave a false judgment and would then only loosen once he made a just one. He is also mentioned in the Ogam Tract for creating one of the three Bríatharogam, used to interpret the Ogham alphabet. In ancient Irish law, the Ogham carved stones on a piece of land represented the underpinning of legal ownership to that land.

Morann is also associated with the manuscript Audacht Morainn (The Testament of Morann), a medieval old Irish wisdom literature which gave advice to a prospective or future king. It was produced as a piece of insight for Feradach Finnfechtnach, just before he was made a high king. There are five known compositions of this genre in Old Irish, most notably Tecosca Cormaic or Bríathra Flainn Fína mac Ossu, although Audacht Morainn is the oldest. It is officially seen by many to be the forerunner to the 9th century Mirrors for princes, which was produced by an Irish Christian monk called Sedulius Scottus.

== Nemed Schools of Law ==
The Bretha Nemed school's, trained bards in the poetico-legal disciplines, allegedly these schools were all located in Munster, they may originally had strong connections with the Mumu Kingdom. The two major manuscripts produced by these schools are the Bretha Nemed Toísech (First Judgment of Privileged Ones) and the Bretha Nemed Déidenach (Final Judgment of Privileged Ones). The old Irish word 'Nemed' means "privileged" or "holy" in English, the term was also associated with a certain ancient mythical character and race that once existed on the island. According to the Lebor Gabála Érenn the first ever Beltane fire in Ireland was lit on the Hill of Uisneach by a Nemedian druid called Mide. The fire was seen from as far away as the Hill of Tara, when those at Tara saw it, they followed suit and lit their own fire. The Old Irish name for the county of Meath derives from this same Nemedian druid called Mide and it is also the old Irish word for "centre" which is generally used as a reference to the geographical and spiritual importance of the Hill of Uisneach.

In Bretha Nemed Toísech (First Judgment of Privileged Ones) some of its composition is attributed to the accounts of three kinsmen, Fornannán (a Bishop), Máel Tuili (a poet), Báethgalach hua Búirecháin (a judge), who flourished during the reign of Cathal mac Finguine. This manuscript mostly tackles legal matters concerning the early church and the importance of the role of ecclesiastical scholars, which is reflected also in the Uraicecht Becc and Collectio canonum Hibernensis both are connected with the Nemed school of law. The Collectio canonum Hibernensis was in created in both Iona Abbey and also at Dairinis near Waterford. A translated Old Irish copy was found among the Bretha Nemed Déidenach law manuscripts.

There are also numerous Áiliu poems and extracts from Aimirgin Glúngel tuir tend within the Bretha Nemed Déidenach tracts, Áiliu means "to invoke" in English. It was a style of poetry that was associated with the legendary figure of Amergin Glúingel, in Milesian mythology its claimed he passed both the first judgment and recited the first Irish language poem (The Song of Amergin) when he set foot on a land that would become known as Ireland. Although much earlier groups or invaders in their respective Mythologies also have accounts of judgments being made in Irish history, groups such as Túatha Dé Danann and Cessairians.

== Book of Aicill and Fénechus Law ==
The first attempt at transferring Brehon law into written code or legal text was carried out under the patronage of King Cormac mac Airt. He produced the Book of Achall or Aicill, written between 227 and 266 AD, which relates mainly to criminal law. Cormac is said to have retired to the mound of Aicill, in what is now called Skreen near Tara and started working on the book.

Another later significant document was Senchas Már or Fénechus Law (that which relates to the Féine), drafted around 438 AD by a select committee of nine, presided over by Saint Patrick. Senchas Már is mostly associated with ancient Civil law, selective parts of pre-Christian Irish law that were deemed non-compatible to the teachings of the new Christian age were excluded by the committee from the final written tract. Dubthach maccu Lugair was the judge or Brehon chosen by St Patrick, as part of the committee of three kings, three bishops and three professors of literature, poetry and law, in the creation of Senchas Már.

The earliest tracts were produced in the oldest archaic form of Irish dialect known as 'Bérla Féine', some also suggest the written text to be an ancient poetic legal dialect of Dubthach. According to Irish myth the "Feine" were descendants of a legendary figure known as Fénius Farsaid, who is said to have created the ancient language "Bérla Féne". These early manuscripts proved a difficult challenge for centuries after to translate for future academics and even to later Brehons. Only in the seventeenth century did Irish Gaelic scholars such as Eugene O'Curry and John O'Donovan manage to translate much of these original text, but only due to a life-long study.

Berla Fene was one of the five extensions of the Goídelc language; it was known as the legal dialect or dark speech of the Filí and the Brehon. The 7th-century manuscript Auraicept na n-Eces or "Scholars Primer" describes the mythical origins of the Ollav, 72 named linguistic scholars who had assisted Fenius Farsaid, later asked him to select from all the languages, and develop a tongue that nobody else should have but which might belong to them alone. Fenius created Berla Tobaide and later commanded Gaedheal son of Eathor or Goídel mac Ethéoir to set about arranging and regulate into five dialects and name them all after himself. Berla Fene makes up the corpus of the earliest written manuscripts and proved the most challenging to translate in the Christian Era.

The first detailed scientific study of ancient Irish law tracts took place in the 20th century. A comprehensive study of difficult Old Irish law texts was carried out by German Celticist Rudolf Thurneysen, English linguist Charles Plummer and Irish Historian Eoin Mac Neill.

== Bríg Ambue or Bríg Brethach (Bríg of the Judgments) ==
Bríg Ambue, also Bríg Brethach, was a woman who held office as a Brehon, or judge, in early Ireland; there is debate as to whether she is a quasi-historical or completely mythical figure. She is often confused with other early Brígs as well as with lore related to Saint Brigid and the pre-Christian goddess Brigid who had a strong connection with the filí. Bretha Bríge Ambue (“The Judgments of Bríg the Propertiless (or ‘the Cowless’)) has been listed as an authoritative legal text alongside extant Old Irish law texts such as Gúbretha Caratníath (The ‘False’ Judgments of Caratníath), and Bretha Déin Chécht (The Judgments of Dían Cécht). However, a copy of the Bretha Bríge Ambue has never been found, so some question whether it ever existed or whether it was simply a reference to "a series of rulings attributed to the mythical Bríg by later jurists which constitute adjustments to existing customary law to make some provisions more suitable to women’s needs and special circumstances."

== Decline of Brehon Law ==
The gradual decline of Brehon legal practice began during the Norman conquest, it continued to co-exist with an imposed legal system from the 12th century onwards.

It was only in the middle 19th century when two Church of Ireland clergymen, James Henthorn Todd and Charles Graves, asked the British Government to set up a Brehon Law Commission in 1852 in order to save the ancient law text. Native Irish Scholars Eugene O'Curry and John O'Donovan were employed by the commission to translate old law manuscripts.

Brehons had a tradition of providing bardic schools, from pre-Christian times up until middle of the seventeenth century. They provided education in Irish language, literature, history and Brehon law. These scholarly institutions facilitated up to what amounted to university education. They had a history of producing an abundance of Poets and Bard's. The imposition of Penal law, Popery Act combined with the first Cromwellian regime saw the suppression of these native educational institutions. As a result, secret hedge schools began to appear up until the Penal laws ended.

There was suppression before that date, with an example from the time when Sir John Davies was the Attorney-General for Ireland and held the first ever assize in Fermanagh in the ruined monastery on Devenish Island. An old Brehon was a spectator and a book of Irish law was found on him which was confiscated to his great distress.

== See also ==
- Kritarchy
- Mac Aodhagáin
- Mac Fhirbhisigh
- Mac Gafraidh
- Ó Cianáin
- Ó Cléirigh
- Ó Cobhthaigh
- Ó Domhnalláin
- Ó Draighnáin
- Ó Duibh dá Bhoireann
- Ó Breaslain
- Ó Deoradhain
- Sister Fidelma a fictional Brehon, created by novelist Peter Berresford Ellis
