= Anfuigell =

Early Irish legal text on cases where judgement is difficult

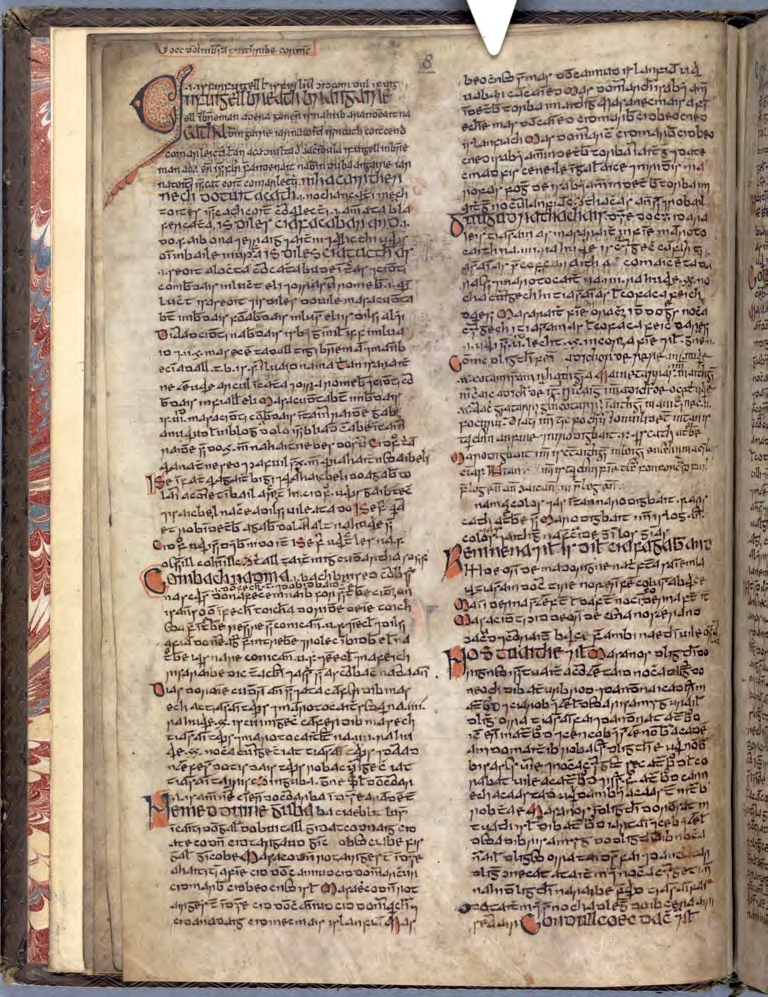
An excerpt from Anfuigell dealing with the property of people killed during battle (Trinity College, Dublin MS 1387).

Anfuigell (Old Irish for "Wrong judgement" or "No judgement") is a fragmentarily preserved early Irish legal text, dealing with situations in which legal judgement is difficult or impossible.

== Manuscripts ==
No copy of Anfuigell has survived. Instead, quotations and excerpts from it are preserved (with commentary) in various manuscripts. For example, O'Davoren's Glossary preserves three quotes from Anfuigell. Some excerpts belonging to Aidbred were previously mis-allocated to Anfuigell. Charlene Eska has published the fragments of Anfuigell (divided into 58 sections and a heading) with translation and commentary.

The title derives from the incipit of the text: Anfuigell breath brangaire catha ("The wrong decision of a judge is a raven's call to battle"). The word anfuigell can be analysed as negative prefix an- + fuigell ('judgement'). It can be translated as "wrong judgement" or "no judgement".

== Contents ==
The subject-matter of Anfuigell is scenarios in which judgement is difficult or impossible. Many different scenarios, touching on an unusually broad range of early Irish law, are thus discussed. It shares with Gúbretha Caratniad and Recholl Breth an interest in unusual or exceptional cases in early Irish law. In some of these scenarios, where the judge cannot decide in favour of either party, it is deemed improper to even have brought the case before a judge. From the surviving fragments, it is difficult to see a method by which these scenarios were organised. Eska conjectures that the text originally had the same dialogic structure as Gúbretha Caratniad.

In discussing so varied a set of legal matters, Anfuigell shines light on a number of aspects of early Irish society. For example, the section of Anfuigell on funerals gives very early evidence for the practice of keening. Eska emphasises the image they give us "of the sordid side of medieval Irish society". Anfuigell contains provisions for contracts entered into while drunk and injuries sustained at funerals.

In two manuscript sources, the Anfuigell carries a Middle Irish introduction. This introduction follows an accessus ad auctores schema, giving pseudo-historical details as to the place (Fuithrime Cormaic, i.e., Muckross Estate), time (of Finguine mac Cú-cen-máthair), author and reason (one Cumain, who was confused by a ruling). It appears to have been modelled after the introduction to another legal text, Cáin Ḟuithirbe. Fangzhe Qiu suggests the Cumain referenced here was intended to be Cumméne Fota, a 7th-century bishop.

The surviving text of Anfuigell is a combination of linguistic layers. This frustrates assigning it a date on a linguistic basis. Eska suggests that it could be dated anywhere between the second half of the 8th and the 9th centuries.
