= Recholl Breth =

Early Irish legal text on cases where legal fault is obscure

Recholl Breth (Old Irish for "Shroud of Judgements") is a legal text dealing with cases in which a legal fault is not immediately obvious. It touches on contract law, rightful kings, and marriage law.

It is the 13th text in the Senchas Már.

== Manuscripts and title ==
There is a single complete copy of Recholl Breth, contained in Dublin, Trinity College, MS 1433 alongside six other texts from the middle third of the Senchas Már. Two other manuscripts (Trinity College MS 1336 and 1337) have extracts from it, with commentary. An edition, with translation, was included in the Ancient Laws of Ireland (Vol. 4, 1879). However, this was erroneously edited as if it were part of the text of Din Techtugud, a preceding text in the Senchas Már dealing with land possession. As of 2019, Charlene Eska was preparing a new edition and translation of Recholl Breth.

The title Recholl Breth is found in various forms in the manuscript tradition (Rechull, Racholl, Rocholl, etc.). Liam Breatnach registered doubt as to whether the initial word was to be interpreted as recholl ("shroud") or rocholl ("destruction, violation"). O'Davoren's Glossary, an early modern Irish legal dictionary, glosses the first word of the title as "rationality". However, this appears to be the result of the misanalysis of the word as ro (emphasising prefix) + cíall ("wisdom"). In a 2016 article, Eska has argued the title "Shroud of judgements" is appropriate, given that the text deals with many cases in which a legal fault is not immediately obvious.

== Contents ==
Recholl Breth is the 13th text of the collection of legal texts called the Senchas Már, placed in the middle third of that collection. The compilation of the Senchas Már is generally dated between the late 7th and early 8th century CE.

Recholl Breth comprises 10 sections. Sections 1 and 2 are prefatory, and deal with the virtues and role of a king in a legal system. Of the following sections: sections 3 is a heptad, dealing with the signs that a king is not the rightful king; section 4 is a triad, dealing with the lies "which god avenges"; sections 5 through 9 deal with contract law (with 5 and 7 being a tetrad and triad respectively); and section 10 deals with the division of "bride-price" (a price paid by a woman's suitor to some relevant party).

Eska has analysed each of these section, and argues the underlying theme is that legal fault is not immediately obvious in the cases dealt with. She takes the mixed style of presentation (triad, tetrads, heptads, and un-numbered sections) as evidence the text was compiled from other sources along this theme. In this capacity, Eska compares it to Gúbretha Caratniad and Anfuigell, two other early Irish legal texts also concerned with exceptional or unusual cases. Alice Taylor-Griffiths describes the subject-matter of these three texts as "advanced learning" for the early Irish lawyer.
