= Aimirgin Glúngel tuir tend =

Poem written by Gilla in Chomded húa Cormaic

Aimirgin Glúngel tuir tend, Middle Irish poem by Gilla in Chomded húa Cormaic.

== Overview ==
Aimirgin Glúngel tuir tend ("Aimirgin bright-knee the strong hero") is a Middle Irish poem on the authors and laws of Ireland, by Gilla in Chomded húa Cormaic (fl. 1150-c.1170), who was a poet and monastic scholar of Tulach Léis. The date range of the work is c. 1100–1160.

== See also ==
- Early Irish law

== Manuscript sources ==
- Royal Irish Academy, MS 1225, folios 142r–v (alias D ii 1, alias Book of Uí Maine, late 14th to early 15th century. Adam Cuisin copied this poem sometime between 1392 and 1407. R. A. S. Macalister (ed), The Book of Uí Maine, Facsimiles in Collotype of Irish Manuscripts IV (Dublin: Irish Manuscripts Commission 1942); Catalogue of Irish Manuscripts in the Royal Irish Academy, pp 3314–56).
- National Library of Ireland, MS G 488, pages 21–28 (18th to 19th century. Scribe unknown. Nessa Ní Shéaghdha, Catalogue of Irish Manuscripts in the National Library of Ireland, fasc. 10 (Dublin: Institute for Advanced Studies 1987) 99–101).
- Dublin, King's Inns, MS 20, pages 187–91 (c. 1720. Scribe: Tadhg Ó Neachtain. Pádraig de Brún, Catalogue of Irish manuscripts in King's Inns library, Dublin (Dublin: Institute for Advanced Studies 1972).)
- Royal Irish Academy, MS 775, page 57 (alias F v 4. Fragmentary: first two quatrains only).
- Trinity College Dublin Library, 1318, columns 341–42, lower margin (alias H 2. 16 alias Yellow Book of Lecan. A copy of quatrain 25 only).

== Editions ==
- Liam Breatnach, Canon law and secular law in early Ireland: the significance of Bretha Nemed, Peritia 3 (1984) 439–59: 440–41 (edition of 6 quatrains of the poem).
- Peter Smith, Aimirgin Glúngel tuir tend: a Middle-Irish poem on the authors and laws of Ireland, Peritia 8 (1994) 120–50.

== Translation ==
- Liam Breatnach, Canon law and secular law in early Ireland: the significance of Bretha Nemed, Peritia 3 (1984) 439–59: 440–41 (translation of 6 quatrains of the poem).
- Peter Smith, Aimirgin Glúngel tuir tend: a Middle-Irish poem on the authors and laws of Ireland, Peritia 8 (1994) 120–50.

== Secondary literature ==
- Liam Breatnach, Canon law and secular law in early Ireland: the significance of Bretha Nemed, Peritia 3 (1984) 439–59: 440–41.
- Peter Smith, Aimirgin Glúngel tuir tend: a Middle-Irish poem on the authors and laws of Ireland, Peritia 8 (1994) 120–50.
