= Gúbretha Caratniad =

Early Irish legal text

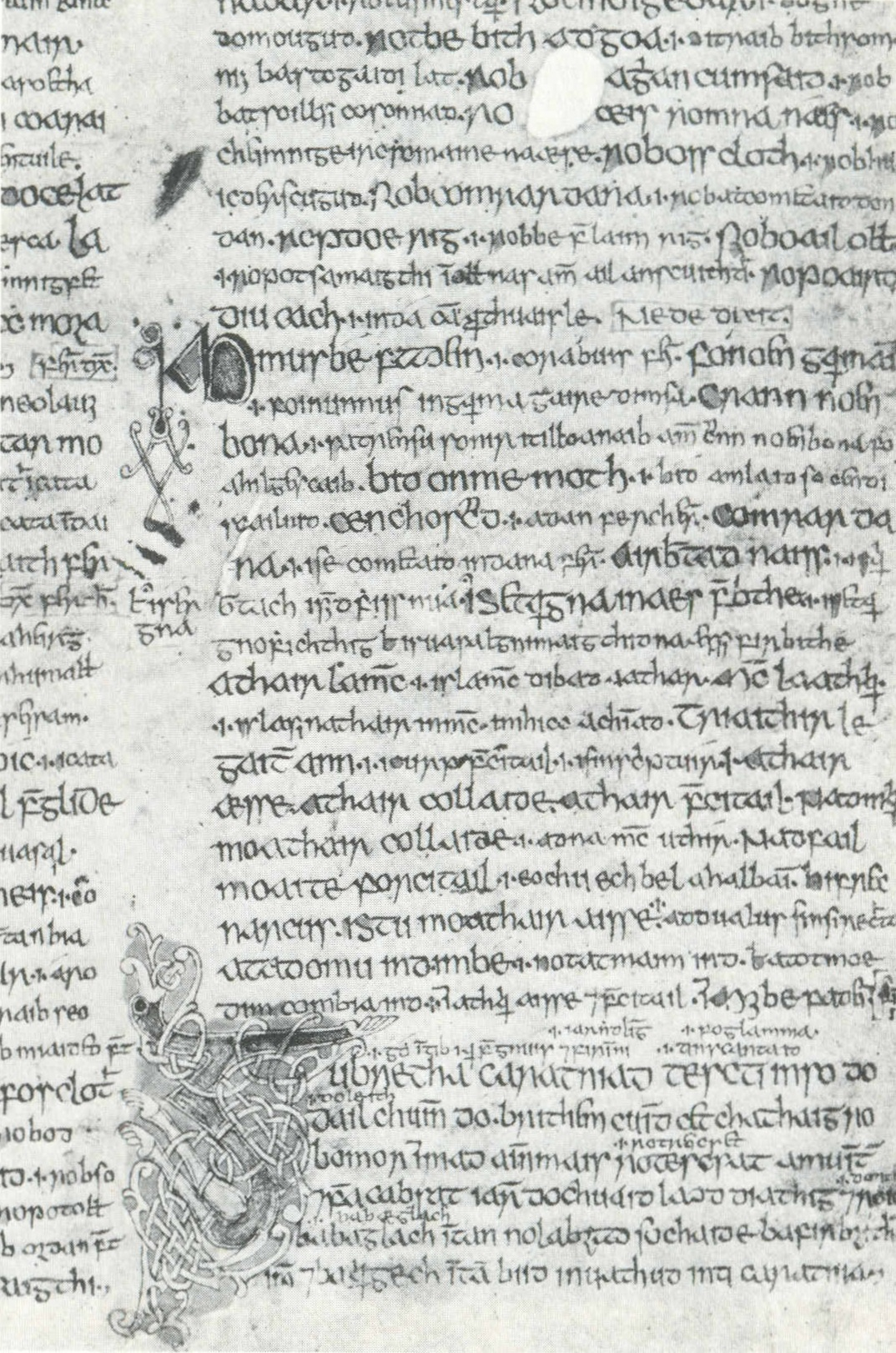
The text of Gúbretha Caratniad begins with the ornamented G at the foot of this page (Rawlinson B 502, fol. 62d).

Gúbretha Caratniad (Note: Old Irish pronunciation: [ˈguːβʲɾʲeθa ˈkaɾad̪nʲiːað].) (Old Irish for "False judgements of Caratnia") is a collection of exceptions to the rules of early Irish law. These exceptions are given in a formulaic manner, as a dialogue between the legendary high king Conn Cétchathach and his judge Caratnia, in which Caratnia delivers his judgement, Conn objects, and Caratnia explains the exception.

== Manuscripts ==
The complete text of Gúbretha Caratniad is contained in the Bodleian Library, MS Rawlinson B 502, a 12th-century Irish manuscript which is the oldest to preserve any early Irish law text. The reliability of this manuscript of Gúbretha is quite high. In Rawlinson B 502, glosses to Gúbretha Caratniad are provided, which cite other early Irish texts in order illustrate the rule, or exception, in question. These glosses appear to have been copied by the scribe, rather than originating with him. The other manuscript of Gúbretha is an incomplete text in Dublin, Trinity College MS 1363 (or H 4. 22).

The title is from the incipit of the Rawlinson text: Gúbretha Caratniad Tescti in so ("Here are the false verdicts of Caratnia Tescthe (Note: Caratnia's byname Tescthe, literally "the cut one", is explained in the introduction as deriving from him being abandoned and wounded ("cut") by his people before being adopted into Conn's court.)").

== Contents ==
Gúbretha Caratniad presents a number of exceptions to rules of early Irish law in a formulaic manner. The introductory paragraph (§1) introduces the frame narrative: the legendary high king Conn Cétchathach would pass on the legal cases to his judge Caratnia, and later inquire after them. In the following paragraphs (§2-52), fifty-one "false judgements" of Caratnia are given; these are "false judgements" only superficially, as Conn discovers in each case when he objects and Caratnia explains the relevant exception. Such a dialogue form is rare in early Irish legal texts.

Much scholarship has been dedicated to interpreting the short and difficult prologue to this text. Marilyn Gerriets suggested this prologue reflected a reality of early Ireland, in which the king was the "fount of justice", with his judgement on cases tempered by the advice of legal professionals (like Caratnia). Alice R. Taylor-Griffiths has objected to this on the grounds that the king/judge frame is a pedagogical prop, "not intended to reflect a real-life interaction between king and judge".

The cases in Gúbretha range over an unusually large number of topics. They do not appear to be ordered in any systematic manner. (Note: The two manuscript of Gúbretha differ slightly from each other in the ordering of the cases.) Similar cases are rarely grouped together. Rudolf Thurneysen suggests that its scattered manner of organisation probably did not aid its popularity. Nonetheless, it is this large range of subject matter that makes it valuable for scholars for early Irish law. Gúbretha shares its interest in exceptions with Anfuigell ("Wrong judgement") and Recholl Breth ("Shroud of judgements"). A text which was presumably structured similar to Gúbretha, Antéchtae Breth ("Impropriety of judgements"), has been largely lost.

Gúbretha Caratniad does not seem to have been a very popular text. Only one citation from it is known in the corpus of early Irish law. The glosses are often mistaken about the nature of the law they intend to explain, which shows that Gúbretha was misunderstood at an early stage. Taylor-Griffiths suggested the text was intended for "advanced students of law", and was "exemplary, rather than exhaustive".

The language of Gúbretha Caratniad dates it to the 8th century CE. Thurneysen suggests that its legal viewpoint was representative of earlier Irish law. Heinrich Wagner compared §39 of Gúbretha, dealing with the law of rape, to a passage from the Hittite laws.

== Excerpt ==
In §51, Caratnia gives an exception to the rule that a king could demand his honour-price (Note: According to Fergus Kelly, a person's honour-price is the amount "to be paid for any major, offence committed against him, e.g. murder, satire, serious, injury, refusal of hospitality, theft, violation of his protection, etc.".) from a poet who satirised him:

"I decided: The king is in possession of his honour after [i.e., in spite of] the insult." - "You decided wrongly", said Conn. - "I did it properly," said Caratnia, "for he received praise, so that the praise was more glorious [i.e., outweighed the insult]."

== See also ==
- Sechtae, a similarly wide-ranging early Irish legal text.
