= Sechtae =

Early Irish legal text

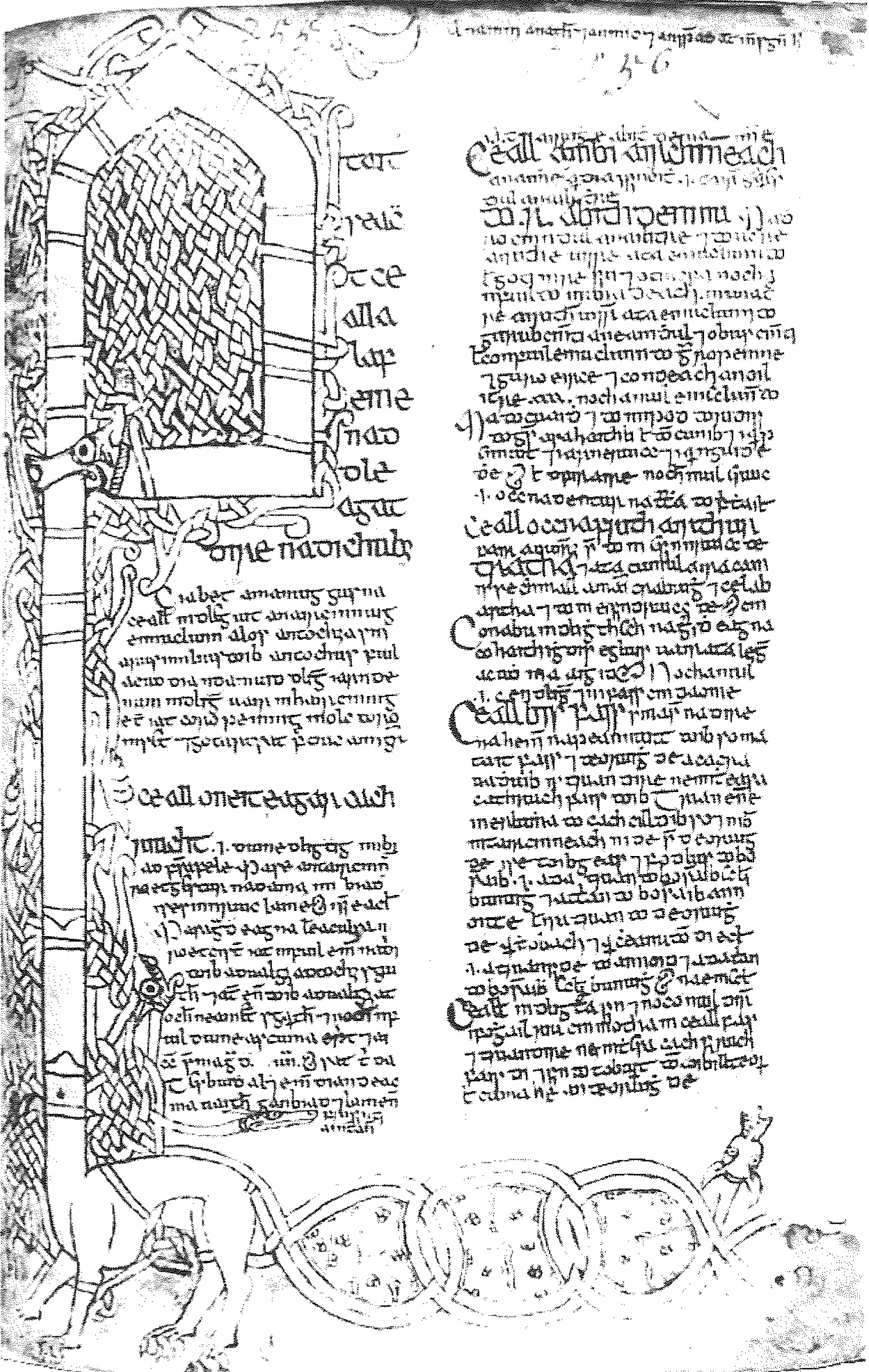
The highly decorated initial A begins Heptad I (Trinity College, MS 1336).

The Sechtae (Old Irish for "Heptads") is a collection of sixty-five heptads (mnemonic lists of seven) on various subjects in early Irish law. It is among the longest and most wide-ranging sources for early Irish law.

The Sechtae is the ninth text in the Senchas Már.

== Manuscripts ==
The Sechtae is only preserved in a complete form in one manuscript (Bodleian Library MS Rawlinson B 487), though Rudolf Thurneysen refers to the quality of this manuscript as "very poor". Portions of the Sechtae or quotes from it are preserved in several other manuscripts.

In early Irish legal commentaries, the Sechtae is referred to as na sechta ("the sevens").

== Contents ==
The Sechtae is among the longest surviving texts of early Irish law. It is the ninth text of the collection of legal texts called the Senchas Már, placed at the beginning of the middle third of that collection. The compilation of the Senchas Már is generally dated between the late 7th and early 8th century CE. It is not clear whether law texts like the Sechtae were written by lay or clerical authors. D. A. Binchy argued the permissive divorce law described in Heptad III was suggestive of a lay author.

The Sechtae comprises sixty-five heptads. These heptads are mnemonic lists of seven corresponding to a legal subject matter (for example, a list of seven places where battles could not be fought), occasionally expanded to eight. The unusual breadth of the subject matter covered in the Sechtae has been commented on. Rudolf Thurneysen deemed them "especially valuable [for the study of Irish law] because they touch on much which is not dealt with in other law texts".

Groups of three (triads) and of seven (heptads) are common in Irish legal texts. Seventeen additional heptads are known from works other than the Sechtae. These heptads are printed as a sequence in Ancient Laws of Ireland, under the name "Additional Heptads", though they never appear in such a sequence in manuscripts. Kelly proposes a Christian origin for the heptad, given the significance attached to the number by Jewish and Greek traditions.

Scholars have discussed various heptads individually in order to clarify features of early Irish law. Eoin MacNeill (1923) translated Heptads XII through XV in a discussion of the law of status; Rudolf Thurneysen (1925) discussed XXV in the context of the legal text Cóic Conara Fugill and (1928) discussed XXX and LXV in the context of the law of surety; Binchy (1938) discussed XXV in the context of sick-maintenance law; Liam Breatnach (1989) discussed I and II in the context of legal disqualification; and Charlene Eska (2022) discussed LXIV in the context of the law of lost property.

== Excerpt ==
The following is a translation of Heptad XV, dealing with the honour-price (Note: According to Fergus Kelly, a person's honour-price is the amount "to be paid for any major, offence committed against him, e.g. murder, satire, serious, injury, refusal of hospitality, theft, violation of his protection, etc.".) of women:

There are seven women in Irish law who are not entitled to payment or honour-price from a person: a woman who steals, a woman who satirizes every class of person, a chantress of tales whose kin pays for her lying stories, a prostitute of the bushes, a woman who wounds, a woman who betrays, a woman who refuses hospitality to every law-abiding person. These are women who are not entitled to honour-price.

== See also ==
- Gúbretha Caratniad, a similarly wide-ranging early Irish legal text.
- Recholl Breth, a similarly wide-ranging early Irish legal tract, which contains one heptad.
