= Cichol Gricenchos =

Figure in Irish mythology

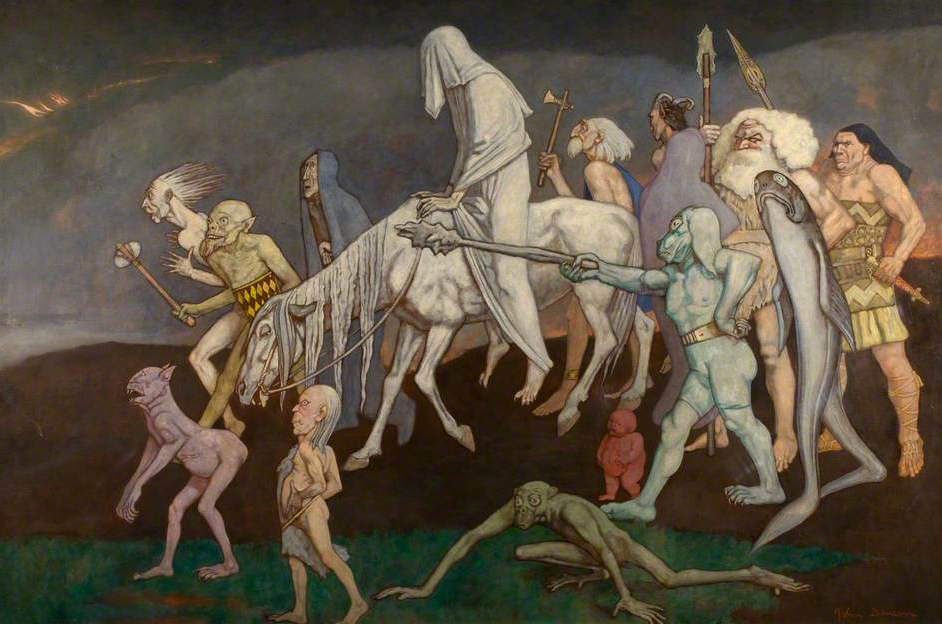

In Irish mythology, Cichol or Cíocal Gricenchos is the earliest-mentioned leader of the Fomorians. His epithet, Gricenchos or Grigenchosach, is obscure. Macalister translates it as "clapperleg"; Comyn as "of withered feet". O'Donovan leaves it untranslated.

According to the Lebor Gabála Érenn, he arrived in Ireland with 200 men and 600 women, who subsisted by fishing and fowling for 200 years until the arrival of Partholón, 311 years after the Flood, whose followers were the first to bring animal husbandry, the plough, houses and brewing to Ireland. Ten years later, Partholón defeated Cichol and the Fomorians in the Battle of Mag Itha.
