= Helen Shenton =

Librarian and College Archivist at Trinity College Dublin

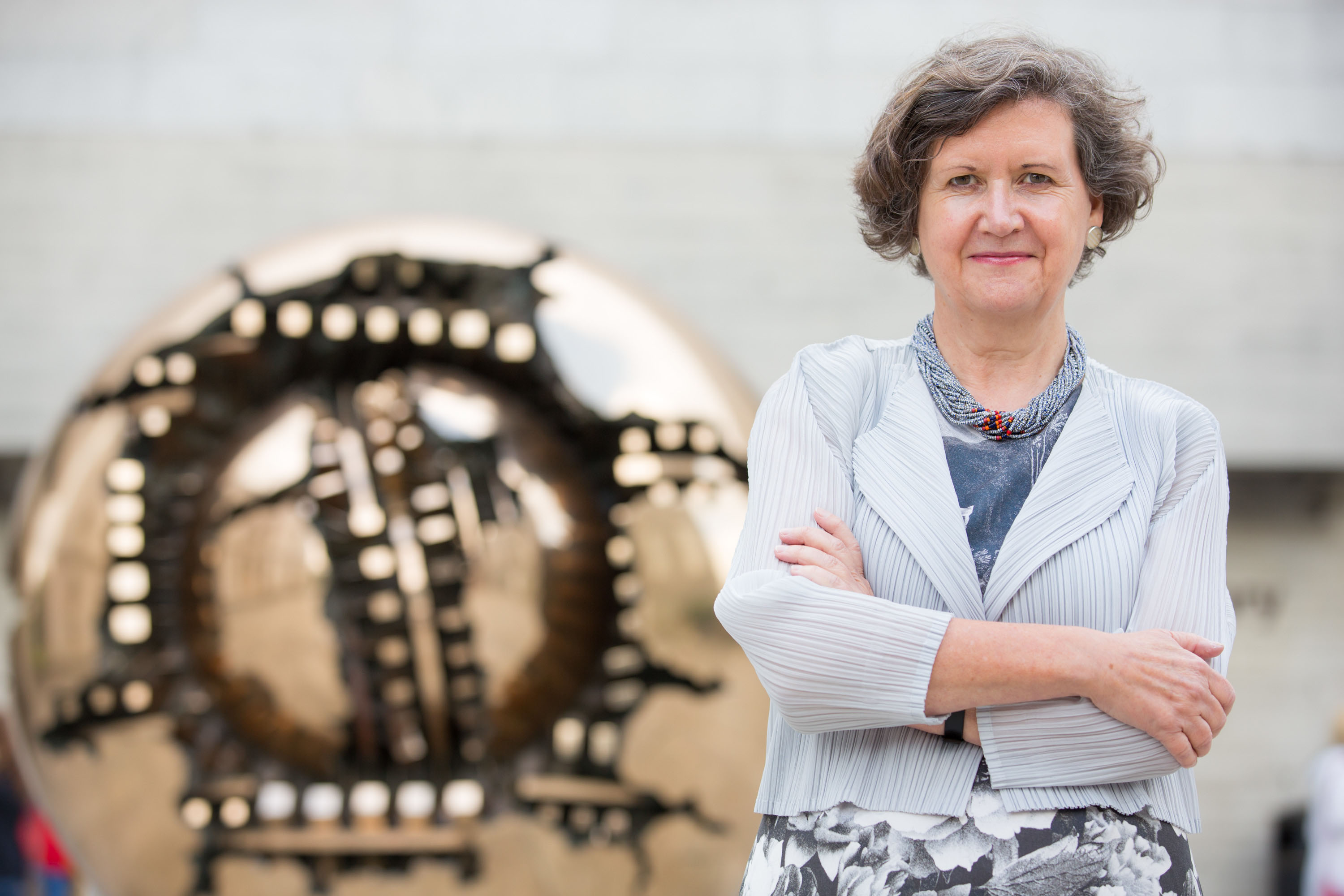
- Helen Shenton by the Pomodoro Sphere, Trinity College Dublin, in 2014.
- Born: 1958 (age 67–68)
- Education: University College London
- Occupation: Librarian
- Employer: Trinity College Dublin
- Known for: Librarian and College Archivist at the Library of Trinity College Dublin
- Predecessor: Robin Adams

Helen Shenton is Librarian and College Archivist at Trinity College Dublin. She has held that role at the Library of Trinity College Dublin since June 2014, the first woman to do so since the University was founded in 1592. Prior to this she was Executive Director of Harvard Library, a role that saw the amalgamation of services across 73 libraries. Previously, she had 25 years' experience in the care of renowned collections through positions at the British Library and the Victoria and Albert Museum in London.

== Life and career ==
Shenton was born in April 1958. Having started her career in conservation after reading English Literature at University College London, Shenton was the last assistant to the Arts & Crafts bookbinder and influential conservator, Roger Powell OBE, who conserved and rebound the Book of Kells.

At the Library of Trinity College Dublin, Shenton has led a new Strategy for the Library, including a year-long public debate around 'The Library of the Future; the Future of the Library'. Shenton is Programme Sponsor of the Old Library Redevelopment Project and the Virtual Trinity Library programme, both of which are flagship projects for the University's philanthropic campaign in which Shenton is deeply involved. She co-chaired Trinity's Task Force on Open Scholarship with the then Dean of Research Professor Linda Doyle; is a member of the Trinity Legacy Review Working Group and is recalibrating the strategic direction of the Library.

Shenton represents Trinity on national and international fora, including the League of European Research Libraries (LERU), the Irish University Association Library Group (IUALG) and UK Legal Deposit Librarians. She is a member of the Board of the National Museum of Ireland.

She has published and presented in international fora and media, most recently in July 2022, a keynote address at the IFLA World Library & Information Congress. She has written and spoken about the transformational shifts influencing the future of libraries in national media, and at TEDxDublin.

During her time at Trinity, Shenton has played a leading role in the installation of four new sculptures in the Old Library to honour the scholarship of four trailblazing women. The women represented are the scientist Rosalind Franklin, the folklorist, dramatist and theatre-founder Augusta Gregory, the mathematician Ada Lovelace and the pioneering women's rights advocate Mary Wollstonecraft. The new sculptures, the first to be commissioned in more than a century, are now displayed among the 40 marble sculptures that line Trinity's historic Long Room, which were hitherto all of men. The artworks represent men throughout history, from Homer and Shakespeare to Dean Jonathan Swift, Sir William Rowan Hamilton and Wolfe Tone. The four women honoured were chosen in 2020 from more than 500 nominations by students, staff, and alumni covering a wide field of ground-breaking individuals who contributed significantly to scholarship and culture across history. Shenton was Chair of the Artist Selection Panel.

Previous to her role at Trinity College Dublin, Shenton had 25 years' experience in the care of renowned collections through positions at the British Library (BL) and the Victoria and Albert Museum in London and was a member of organisations such as the Digital Preservation Coalition, League of European Research Libraries (LIBER) and International Federation of Library Associations (IFLA). She has been involved with international world heritage projects such as the virtual re-unification of the earliest New Testament, Codex Sinaiticus, an international peer review of the Lindisfarne Gospels, and extensive involvement with galleries, and exhibitions in Asia and Europe. Shenton has worked both on new buildings (BL Centre for Conservation; BL high-density, robotic, low-oxygen store) and historically significant building projects. An early identifier of the preservation challenges of digital objects, Shenton co-created the Digital Preservation Group at the BL and was project sponsor of the early Digital Library System.
