= Battle of Mag Itha =

Mythical Irish battle

- Part of Mythological Cycle
| Date | circa 2580 BCE |
| Location | Disputed |
| Result | Victory for the followers of Partholón |

Belligerents
| Followers of Partholón | Fomorians |

Commanders and leaders
| Partholón | Cichol Gricenchos |

Strength
| | 300-800 Fomorians |

Casualties and losses
| | All Fomorians killed |

Mag Itha, Magh Ithe, or Magh Iotha was, according to Irish mythology, the site of the first battle fought in Ireland. Medieval sources estimated that the battle had taken place between 2668 BCE and 2580 BCE (Anno Mundi 2530 or 2618). The opposing sides comprising the Fomorians, led by Cichol Gricenchos, and the followers of Partholón.

According to the Lebor Gabála Érenn, the Fomorians had lived in Ireland for 200 years, subsisting by fishing and fowling, before the arrival of Partholón, whose people were the first in Ireland to build houses and brew ale. The Lebor Gabála dates Partholón's arrival in Ireland to AM 2608 (2590 BCE), and says the Battle of Mag Itha took place ten years later, in AM 2618 (circa 2580 BCE). The plain of Mag Itha is said to have been cleared by Partholón's hireling Ith, and the battle to have taken place on the slemna, or "smooth lands", of that plain. 300 Fomorians took part in the battle, and Partholón was victorious. The earliest recensions of the Lebor Gabála say that Cichol was killed and the Fomorians destroyed; later recensions say the Fomorians had one arm and one leg each, the battle lasted a week, and no-one was killed or wounded as it was fought by magic.

The Annals of the Four Masters dates the battle to Anno Mundi 2530 (c. 2668 BCE), and says 800 Fomorians took part in the battle, all of whom were killed. Geoffrey Keating's Foras Feasa ar Éirinn also mentions the battle, but gives little detail and no date.

== Location ==
The location of Mag Itha is disputed with several locations given:

- Magh Itha an Indusa, an old name for Magh Ene, an area of land which lies between Lough Erne, County Fermanagh, and the Drowes in County Donegal. This location is close to Dernish Island, County Sligo, a suggested location of the Fomorians island.
- John O'Donovan, in his notes to his edition and translation of the Annals of the Four Masters, places Mag Itha along the River Finn, near Lough Swilly in the barony of Raphoe, County Donegal, where the medieval tuath of Magh Itha was.
- R. A. Stewart Macalister, in his notes to his edition and translation of the Lebor Gabála Érenn, adds that there were other plains of that name south of Arklow, County Wicklow, and in the territory of the Déisi.

== See also ==
- History of Ireland
- Irish battles
