= O'Davoren =

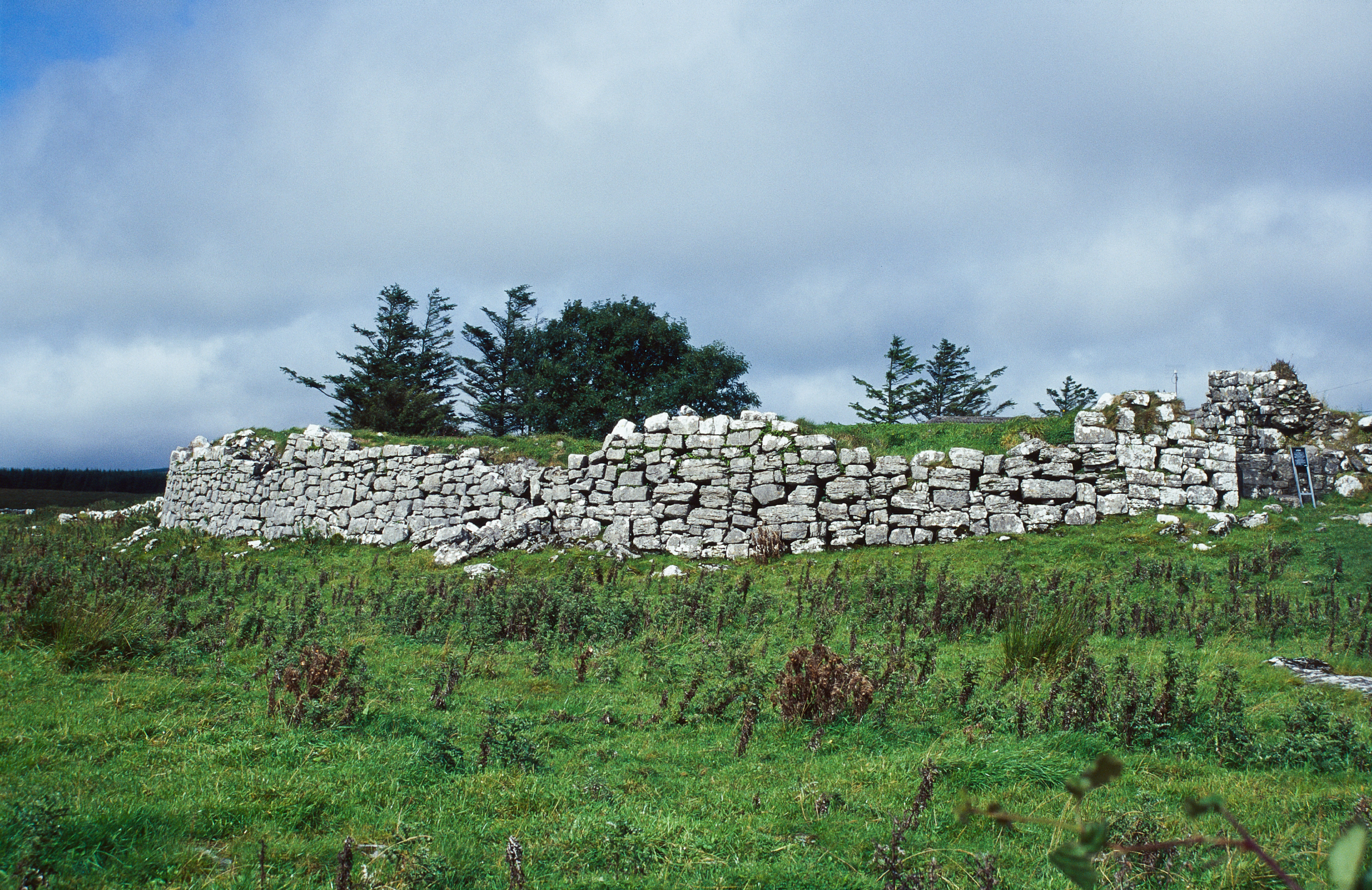
Ruins of the O'Davoren law school at Cahermacnaghten, County Clare

The O'Davoren (Irish: Ó Duibhdábhoireann) family were a scholarly clan of Corcomroe, Thomond (modern-day County Clare), Ireland active since medieval times.

Famed for their sponsorship of schools and knowledge of history and Early Irish law, the Uí Dhuibh dá Bhoireann were known throughout Ireland as a literary family and held estates in the Burren down to the mid seventeenth century at the time of the Cromwellian confiscations. Many acted as brehons for the local ruling dynasty of Uí Loughlin from the 14th century or earlier.

== Origins ==
The O'Davorens, like the O'Hehirs and some other septs west of the Shannon in County Clare Ireland, belonged to the Eoghanacht stock claiming name and descent from the son of Aengus, King of Cashel, slain 957. The family settled in the Burren in mediaeval times, exact date unknown. We first hear of them as hereditary ollamhs to the O'Loghlens of that district, who are of the race of Fergus mac Roigh, of Ulster. The earliest reference to them in print is in the Annals of the Four Masters under the year 1364, where the death of Giolla na Naomh Ó Duibh dá Bhoireann, ollamh of Corcomdhruadh in Brehon law, is recorded.

According to historian C. Thomas Cairney, the O'Davorens were a chiefly family of the Corco Modhruadh tribe who in turn came from the Erainn tribe who were the second wave of Celts to settle in Ireland from about 500 to 100 BC.

== Excavation ==
The O'Davoren law school at Cahermacnaghten has been the subject of archaeological and historical interest and its remains are still extant. The law school operated in the sixteenth and seventeenth century, with a Giolla na Naomh Óg Ó Duibh dá Bhoireann being recorded as one of its chief owners in the seventeenth century. The O'Davorens's were recorded as still holding Cahermacnaghten in 1659, along with 13 Irish tenants.

== Literary production ==
The most important surviving document associated with them is known as Egerton 88 (British Library), being compiled between 1564 and 1569. It contains copies of some important texts of Early Irish law, in addition to a number of Old Irish literary tales.

== See also ==
- O'Davoren's Glossary
- Irish clans
