= Egerton Collection =

The Egerton Collection is a collection of historical manuscripts held in the British Library. The core of the collection comprises 67 manuscripts bequeathed to the British Museum in 1829 by Francis Henry Egerton, 8th Earl of Bridgewater, along with £12,000 (the Bridgewater fund). To this sum a further £3000 (the Farnborough Fund) was added in 1838 by Egerton's cousin, Charles Long, 1st Baron Farnborough. The income from the bequests is devoted to the purchase of further manuscripts, which are added to the original collection. This means that the Egerton series, unlike most other named series of manuscripts held by the Library, remains open to new accessions.

== See also ==
- British Library, MS Egerton 88
- British Library, MS Egerton 1782
- Egerton Gospel
