= Cenn Fáelad mac Ailella =

Irish scholar

Cenn Fáelad mac Ailella (alias Cennfaeladh; died 679) was an early medieval Irish scholar renowned for his powerful memory and potential eidetic memory, an unintended consequence of a head wound in battle.

== Ancestry ==
He was a member of the Cenél nEógain, being a grandson of King Báetán mac Muirchertaig (King of Cenél nEógain), a great-great-great-great grandson of Niall Noígiallach, and a first cousin once removed of Aldfrith of Northumbria via his first cousin, Fina.

His father Ailill mac Báetán was murdered in Templeport in modern-day County Cavan, Republic of Ireland, according to the Annals of Ulster: "U620.1. The slaying in Magh Slécht in the territory of Connacht of the kindred of Báetán, i.e. of Ailill son of Báetán and of Mael Dúin son of Fergus son of Báetán; and the death of Fiachra son of Ciarán son of Ainmire son of Sétna." According to John Healy, Cenn Fáelad's sister Sabina was the mother of Saint Cuthbert of Lindisfarne.

== Cath Magh Rath ==
Cenn Fáelad fought at the crucial Battle of Moira or Magh Rath (Moira, County Down, Northern Ireland) in 636. During the battle he received a life-threatening head wound, and was afterwards carried to the abbey of Tomregan, County Cavan to be healed in the house of its abbot, Saint Bricín. That this abbey was situated beside Magh Slécht where his father had been slain 16 years earlier may not be a coincidence. His family possibly had land there. This house was situated "where the three streets meet between the houses of the three professors. And there were three schools in the place; a school of Latin learning, a school of Irish law and a school of Irish poetry. And everything that he would hear of the recitations of the three schools every day he would have by heart every night."

This merging of Latin learning, native Irish law and vernacular poetry, ensured Cenn Fáelad's place in Irish legal tradition in his own time and beyond. He is quoted in the Bretha Nemed Toisech in the section dealing with the Church, thus demonstrating the compatibility of ecclesiastical learning with native learning.

== The Scholar ==
Tradition states that as a result of a head wound, Cenn Fáelad's "brain of forgetting was knocked out of him." The effect of this trauma led him to create "a pattern of poetry to these matters and he wrote them on slates and tablets and set them in a vellum book."

The Suidigud Tellaig Temra recounts that because of his vast store of lore, when Diarmait mac Cerbaill wished to establish the original boundaries of Tara, he had recourse to Cenn Fáelad. But even his knowledge did not go back that far in time, and he gathers all the wisest men of Ireland. When they, in turn, cannot provide an answer, they then consult Fintan mac Bóchra, one of the original settlers, miraculously still alive.

His verses were all composed in quatrains of numbered syllables with regular rhyme, and moderate use of alliteration, in contrast to a more archaic form that was still practised in the south of Ireland at the time (i.e., Leinster and Munster). Most or all of his historical verse relate to his own dynasty, the Cenél nEógain.

He was the first poet quoted in the Irish annals, being referred to as sapiens, a technical term denoting a head teacher or professor in a monastic school (though not necessarily a monk himself). Later manuscripts of legal and grammatical texts were attributed to him, though the earliest of them seem to date from about fifty years after his death.

Robin Flower stated "How far these are really his may be a matter of controversy, but there can be little real doubt that the writings by him existed in the period when the vernacular learning was being eagerly cultivated."

A copy of one of the works attributed to him exists in Trinity College, Dublin Ms 1317, written by the grandfather of Dubhaltach Mac Fhirbhisigh.

Edward O'Reilly gives a full account of his works in his 'Irish Writers'; d. anno 678.
