= British Library, MS Egerton 88 =

Late 16th century Irish manuscript

Egerton MS 88 is a late sixteenth-century Irish manuscript, now housed in the British Library Egerton Collection, London. It is the work of members of the O'Davorens (Irish: Ó Duibhdábhoireann), a distinguished family of lawyers in Corcomroe, County Clare, and was compiled between 1564 and 1569 under the supervision of Domhnall Ó Duibhdábhoireann.

The document is an important collection of medieval Irish legal texts, literature, grammatical works and legal glossaries. It contains a copy of O'Davoren's Glossary.
