= Gilla in Chomded húa Cormaic =

Gilla in Chomded húa Cormaic was a Gaelic-Irish poet of the early Middle Ages, fl. c. 1150 - c.1170.

== Biography ==
Gilla in Chomded was a poet, scribe and scholar at the monastery of Tulach Léis (Tullylisk, County Down).

He authored the poem A Rí richid, réidig dam, which has received extensive scholarly attention since the 19th century but still lacks a critical edition. It survives in the Book of Leinster.

Aimirgin Glúngel tuir tend is another surviving poem credited to him.

== Notes and references ==
=== Further reading ===
- Trinity College Dublin Library, MS 1339 (H 2. 18, Book of Leinster), p. 144b.
- Ernst Windisch, L'ancienne légende irlandaise et les poésies ossianiques. Trad. E. Ernault, Revue Celtique 5 (1881) 70–93.
- Heinrich Zimmer, Anzeige von 'Essai d'un Catalogue de la littérature epique d'Irlande', Göttingische gelehrte Anzeigen (1887) 169–175; 184–193.
- Henri d'Arbois de Jubainville, La littérature ancienne de l'Irlande et l'Ossian de Mac-Pherson, Bibl. de l'École des Chartes 41 (1888) 475–487.
- Alfred Nutt, A new theory of the Ossianic Saga, Academy 39 (1891) 161–163; 235.
- Heinrich Zimmer, Ossin und Oskar. Ein weiteres Zeugnis für den Ursprung der irisch-gälischen Finn (-Ossian-) Sage in der Vikingerzeit, Zeitschrift für deutsches Alterthum 35 (1891) 1–176.
- George Henderson, The Fionn Saga, Celtic Review 1–3 (1904–1906).
- Edmund Curtis, Age and Origin of the Fenian tales, Ivernian Society Journal 1 (1909) 159–168.
- Kuno Meyer, Fianaigecht [Introduction]. Todd Lecture Series 16 (Dublin 1910).
- F. Mezger, Finn mac Cumaill und Fingal bis zum 17. Jahrhundert, American Journal of Philology 48 (1929) 361–367.
- R. D. Scott, The Thumb of Knowledge in legends of Finn, Sigurd and Taliesin. Studies in Celtic and French literature (New York 1930).
- Roger Chauviré (tr.), Contes ossianiques (Paris 1949).
- Josef Weisweiler, Die Kultur der irischen Heldensage, Paideuma 4 (1950) 149–170.
- Gerard Murphy, Duanaire Finn. The Book of the lays of Fionn, pt 3. Dublin 1953 (=ITS volume 43.)
- Gerard Murphy, The Ossianic lore and romantic tales of medieval Ireland, (Dublin 1955; reprinted 1961; reprinted Cork, Mercier Press, 1971 with revisions.)
- Josef Weisweiler, Hintergrund und Herkunft der ossianischen Dichtung, Literaturwissenschaftliches Jahrbuch 4 (1963), p. 21–42.
- David Krause, The hidden Oisín, Studia Hibernica 6 (1966) 7–24.
- Seán Mac Giolla Riabhaigh, 'Ní bía mar do bá.' Scrúdú téamúil ar na laoithe Fiannaíochta, Irisleabhar Mhá Nuad (1970), p. 52–63.
- James MacKillop, Fionn mac Cumhaill: Celtic Myth in English Literature. Syracuse 1986.
- Dáithí Ó hÓgáin, Fionn Mac Cumhaill: Images of a Gaelic Hero, Dublin 1988.
- Máirtín Ó Briain, Review of Ó hÓgáin, Bealoideas 57 (1989), p. 174–183.
- Donald E. Meek, Review of Ó hÓgáin, Cambridge Medieval Celtic Studies 22 (Winter 1991), p. 101–103.

=== External links ===
- http://www.ucc.ie/celt/published/G303018
