= Mac Gafraidh =

Family name

Mac Gafraidh was the surname of a Gaelic-Irish Brehon family.

== Overview ==
The Mac Gafraidh family were ollamhs to the Maguire of Fermanagh. The surname is now generally rendered as Caffrey.

== Annalistic references ==
- M1478.12 Macrifferty, i.e. Ciothruadh, Ollav to Maguire in poetry ... died.
