= Valerie Mulvin =

Irish architect

- Born: 1956 (age 69–70); Dublin, Ireland
- Education: University College Dublin; Trinity College Dublin
- Occupation: Architect
- Spouse: Niall McCullough
- Children: 1
- Awards: Elected to Aosdána (2020)
- Practice: McCullough Mulvin
- Website: mcculloughmulvin.com/studio/team/valerie-mulvin

Valerie Mulvin FRIAI (born 1956) is an Irish architect. She is a member of Aosdána, an elite Irish association of artists.

== Early life ==
Mulvin was born in Dublin in 1956, the eldest child in a family of six; her father worked in insurance and they lived in Dublin and London.

== Career ==
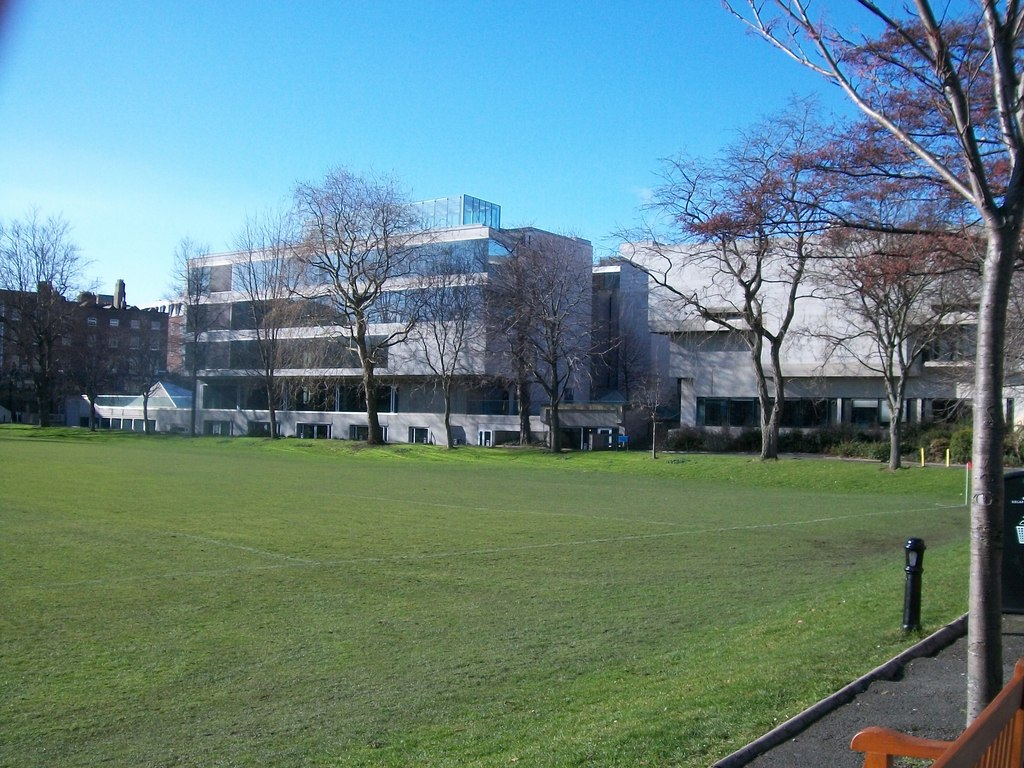
James Ussher Library, designed by Mulvin

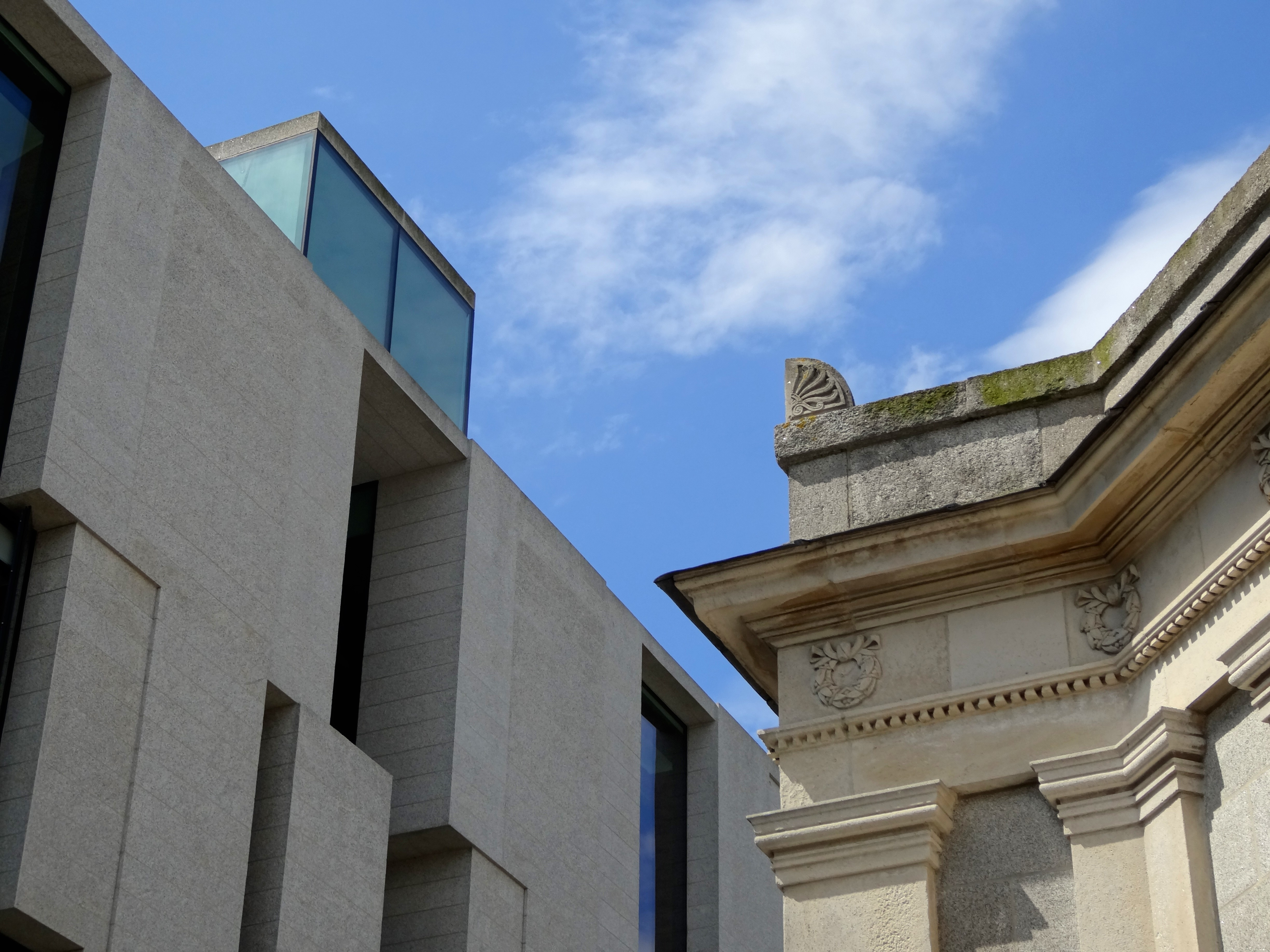
Long Room Hub (left)

Mulvin attended University College Dublin where she met Niall McCullough, her professional partner and later husband; they graduated in 1981 and founded McCullough Mulvin Architects in 1986, and in 1987 published A Lost Tradition: The Nature of Architecture in Ireland. In 1991 she completed a master's degree in Urban Studies (MLitt) at Trinity College Dublin.

Mulvin worked on buildings such as Blackrock Further Education Institute and Public Library, the Irish Architecture Foundation, the Trinity Long Room Hub and the James Ussher Library. In 2020 she was elected to Aosdána.

== Personal life ==
Mulvin married Niall McCullough; he died in 2021.

== Bibliography ==
- A Lost Tradition: The Nature of Architecture in Ireland (1987; with Niall McCullough)
- The Long Room Hub at Trinity College (2010)
- Blackrock Quartet: Blackrock Further Education Institute and the Carnegie Library (2014)
- Approximate Formality (2020)
