= Dealgnaid =

Wife of Partholón in Irish mythology

In Irish mythology, Dealgnaid (or Delgnat) was the wife of Partholón; who was the leader of the second group of people to settle in Ireland.

A poem in the Lebor Gabála Érenn, expanded on by Céitinn, tells how Partholón and his wife lived on a small island near the head of the estuary of the River Erne. Once, while Partholón was out touring his domain, his wife, Delgnat, seduced a servant, Topa. Afterwards they drank from Partholón's ale, which could only be drunk through a golden tube. Partholón discovered the affair when he drank his ale and recognised the taste of Delgnat's and Topa's mouths on the tube. In anger, he killed Topa, and his wife's dog. But Delgnat was unrepentant, and insisted that Partholón himself was to blame, as leaving them alone together was like leaving honey before a woman, milk before a cat, edged tools before a craftsman, or meat before a child, and expecting them not to take advantage. This is recorded as the first adultery and the first jealousy in Ireland. The island they lived on was named Inis Saimera after Saimer, Delgnat's dog.
