= Partholón =

Character in medieval Irish Christian pseudohistory

Partholón (Modern Irish: Parthalán) is a character in medieval Irish Christian pseudohistory, said to have led one of the first groups to settle in Ireland. His name comes from the Biblical name Bartholomaeus (Bartholomew), and may be borrowed from a character in the Christian pseudohistories of Saints Jerome and Isidore of Seville.

== Description ==
In most versions of the tale, Partholón is the leader of the second group of people to settle in Ireland, the Muintir Partholóin (People of Partholón). They arrive on the uninhabited island about 300 years after Noah's Flood and introduce farming, cooking, brewing and building. After some years, they all die of plague in one week.

=== Historia Brittonum ===
The earliest surviving reference to Partholón is in the Historia Brittonum, a 9th-century British Latin compilation attributed to Nennius. It says that Ireland was settled three times by three different groups, with 'Partholomus' arriving first from Iberia with a thousand followers who multiplied until they numbered four thousand, before dying of plague in a single week.

=== Lebor Gabála Érenn ===
The Lebor Gabála Érenn, an 11th-century Christian pseudohistory of Ireland, says that Ireland was settled six times, with Partholón and his followers being the second group. The number may have been chosen to match the "Six Ages of the World". According to the Lebor Gabála, Ireland was uninhabited following the deaths of Cessair and her companions in the Flood. It says that Partholón came from Greece and was the son of Sera, son of Sru, who was himself a descendant of Magog, son of Japheth, who was the son of Noah. Partholón and his people sail to Ireland via Sicily and Iberia, arriving 300 or 312 years after the flood and landing at Inber Scéne (Kenmare in County Kerry). With Partholón were his wife (Delgnat), their three sons (Slanga, Rudraige and Laiglinne), the sons' wives (Nerba, Cichba and Cerbnad), and a thousand followers.

Partholón and all of his people—five thousand men and four thousand women—died of the plague in a single week, on Senmag (the "old plain"), near modern Tallaght, (támh-leacht, meaning "plague-pit").

=== Foras Feasa ar Érinn ===
Seathrún Céitinn's 17th-century compilation Foras Feasa ar Érinn says they arrived in 2061 BC. It claims that Partholón was the son of Sera, the king of Greece, and fled his homeland after murdering his father and mother. He lost his left eye in the attack on his parents. He and his followers set off from Greece, sailed via Sicily and arrived in Ireland from the west, having traveled for two and a half months.

According to Céitinn, at the time of Partholón's arrival, Ireland consisted of one open plain, three lakes and nine rivers. Partholóin cleared four more plains, and seven more lakes burst from the ground. Named figures are credited with having introduced cattle husbandry, ploughing, cooking, dwellings, trade and dividing the island into four parts. Partholon divides Ireland into four parts for his four sons named Er, Orba, Fearon, and Feargna.

In Céitinn's version of the story, at the Battle of Mag Itha, the first battle fought in Ireland, the Partholóin battled and defeated the Fomorians, who were led by Cichol Gricenchos.

A poem in the Lebor Gabála, expanded by Céitinn, tells how Partholón and his wife, Delgnat, lived on a small island near the head of the estuary of the River Erne. Once, while Partholón was out touring his domain, Delgnat seduced a servant named Topa. Afterward, they drank from Partholón's ale, which could only be accessed through a golden tube. Partholón discovered the affair when he drank his ale and recognized the taste of Delgnat's and Topa's mouths on the tube. In anger, he killed Delgnat's dog and Topa. But Delgnat was unrepentant and insisted that Partholón was to blame, as leaving them alone together was like leaving honey before a woman, milk before a cat, edged tools before a craftsman, or meat before a child, and expecting them not to take advantage. This is recorded as the first case of adultery and the first jealousy in Ireland. The island in question was named Inis Saimera after Saimer, Delgnat's dog.

=== Annals of the Four Masters ===
The Annals of the Four Masters says they arrived in 2520 Anno Mundi (after the "creation of the world"). This work states that the plague came 300 years after their arrival, in May, and that one man survived: Tuan, son of Partholón's brother Starn. Known as a legendary seer, Tuan was said to be a storehouse of knowledge of Irish history because he lived across the generations in different incarnations. Through a series of animal transformations, he survived through the centuries to be reborn as the son of a chieftain named Cairell in the time of Colm Cille (6th century AD). He remembered all he had seen, and thus preserved Partholón's story.

Preceded by Cessair	Mythical settlers of Ireland; AFM 2680 BC; FFE 2061 BC	Succeeded by Nemed

== Sources ==
- Nennius (1980). Morris, John (ed.). British history; and The Welsh annals. Phillimore. ISBN 978-0-8476-6264-7.
- Macalister, Robert Alexander Stewart, ed. (1956). Lebor gabála Érenn: The book of the taking of Ireland. Irish Texts Society. Mary Jones
- O'Donovan, John, ed. (1848). Annals of the Kingdom of Ireland by the four masters, from the earliest period to the year 1616: Ed. from the autograph. manuscript with a transl. and copious notes by John O'Donovan. Hodges and Smith. UCC
- Keating, Geoffrey (June 1983). Comyn, D.; Dineen, P. S. (eds.). The History of Ireland: by Geoffrey Keating. Irish Roots Cafe. ISBN 978-0-940134-47-8. UCC
- Morris, John (11 August 1998). The Age of Arthur: A History of the British Isles from 350 to 650. Phoenix. ISBN 978-1-85799-286-1.
- Mackillop, James (14 January 2017). A Dictionary of Celtic Mythology. Oxford University Press. ISBN 978-0-19-880484-0.
