= O'Davoren's Glossary =

Glossary of Old Irish legal terms

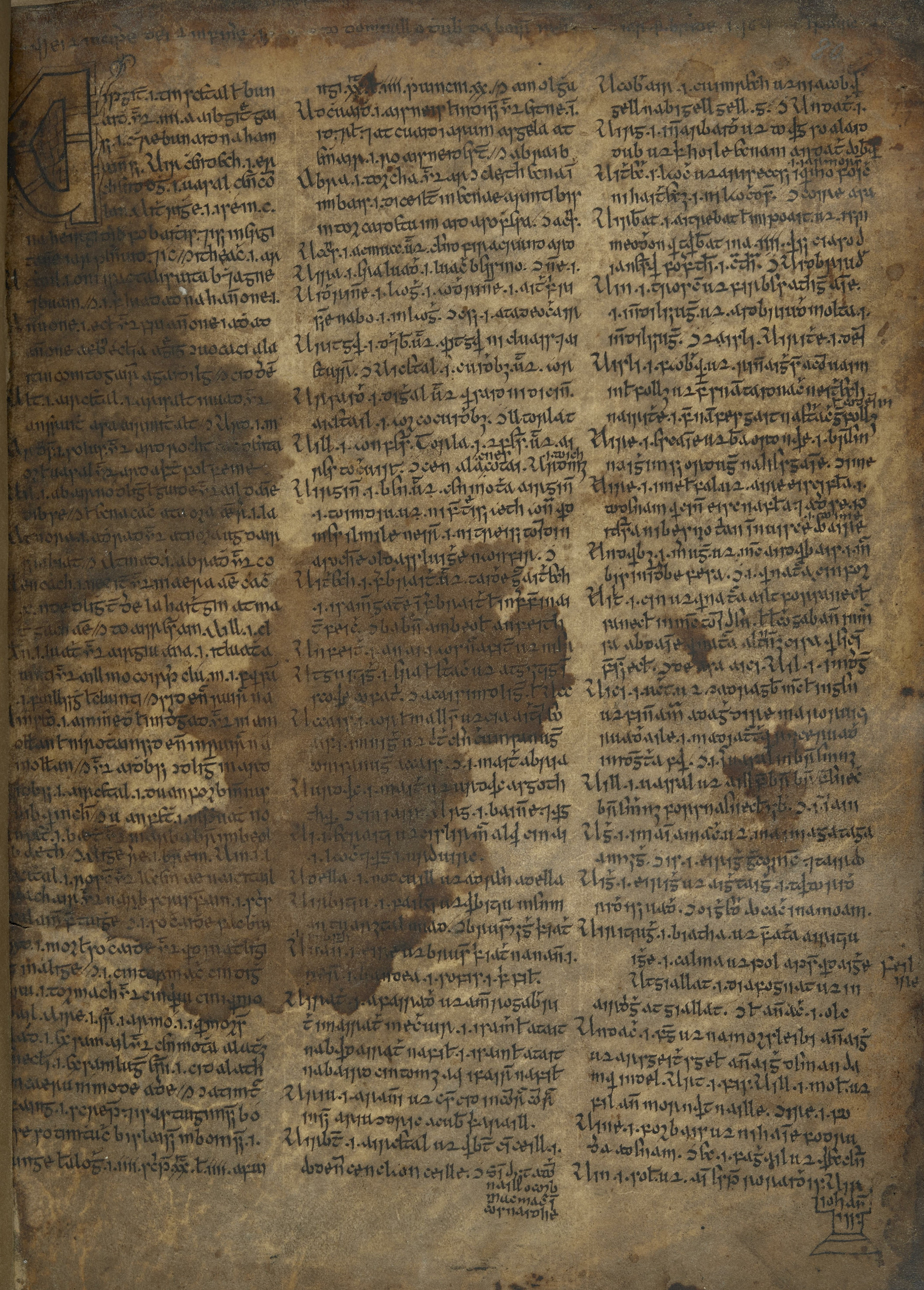
The first page of O'Davoren's Glossary in BL Eggerton MS 88

O'Davoren's Glossary is an early modern glossary of Old Irish terms, many of which are legal in nature. The glossary is important for its well-preserved quotations from early Irish legal texts (which would otherwise have been lost or preserved only in corrupt form). The glossary is associated with the Mac Aodhagáin (McEgan) law school in Park, Galway.

== Manuscripts and editions ==
O'Davoren's Glossary survives in two independent and contemporary copies, British Library, MS Egerton 88 (given the siglum E) and Trinity College Dublin, MS 1317 (given siglum F). E is from the hand of Domhnall Ó Duibhdábhoirenn (O'Davoren) and is dated to 1564. The manuscript Egerton 88 is associated with O'Davorens, an obscure Irish legal family. F is from the hand of Dubhaltach Mór Mac Firbhisigh, and is contemporary with E. (Note: Dubhaltach Mór Mac Firbhisigh was grandfather of the more famous Dubhaltach Mac Firbhisigh (d. 1671), and was active at the same time as the scribe of O'Davoren's Glossary in E, contributing to MS Egerton 88 in 1570.) Of the two manuscripts, F is the much worse preserved: the definitions under the letters A, B, and O are entirely missing; substantial portions are missing from other letters; and, in some sections, the scribe substituted definitions from other glossaries.

Whitley Stokes was the first to publish an edition of O'Davoren's Glossary. His earlier edition (1862) gave the text of E with readings from F in the corrigenda; his later edition (1904), which he published with an English translation, incorporated some readings from F, but was still largely based on E. Daniel Binchy re-edited E in a diplomatic edition for the Corpus Iuris Hibernici (1978). Modern editors have tended to favour the readings from F, where the manuscript is not too badly damaged and the glosses are not borrowed. Liam Breatnach (2005) gives a list of superior readings from F not included in Stokes's later edition.

== Contents ==
O'Davoren's Glossary gives concise definitions of 1618 difficult Old Irish terms. In most cases, an illustrative quote accompanies these definitions (in some cases, two or three quotes). The glosses and quotations in O'Davoren's Glossary are frequently legal in subject matter. O'Davoren's glossary is associated with the Mac Aodhagáin (McEgan) law school in Park, Galway.

The compilers of O'Davoren's Glossary were working with better manuscripts (fewer transmission errors and less abbreviated) of the early Irish legal texts than are available to us today. In many cases, quotes from the glossary have been used by scholars to substitute or correct poor manuscripts of these legal texts. Moreover, a number of legal texts which have not survived, or have survived only in fragments, have quotes from them in the glossary. Liam Breatnach, who has used the glossary to reconstruct the partially lost Senchas Már, calls the glossary "a source of the utmost importance in dealing with incomplete and fragmentarily preserved [legal] texts." The legal texts that the glossary most frequently quotes from are Bretha Nemed Toisech, Bretha Nemed Dédenach, and the first two thirds of Senchas Már.

O'Davoren's Glossary is not solely legal in subject matter. It contains a number of glosses of difficult words from Dindshenchas and from the Mythological Cycle. Quotes from non-legal sources are rare, but occasionally appear. The glossary contains quotes from the Amra Coluimb Chille ("Poem for Saint Columba") and the Félire Óenguso ("Martyrology of Óengus").
