= Trinity College Dublin, MS 1317 =

Trinity College Dublin MS 1317 [H.2.15B] is an autograph manuscript by Dubhaltach Mac Fhirbhisigh (murdered 1671).

The most succinct description of the manuscript is by Irish historian, William O'Sullivan:

[It is] "the most personal of Dubhaltach's surviving manuscripts, including scribblings as well as texts written by himself and his grandfather, Dubhaltach Mor. Unhappily, because written on paper, hard wear has many items in a fragmentary condition."

== Contents ==
- two copies of the longer version of Cormac's Glossary; the first writer by and for Donnchad ... helped by Baothghalach and Flann (pp. 13–40); the second by Dubhaltach's grandfather with help from Conair (mac Muiris) O Maolchonaire, but with additions by Dubhaltach himself
- part of the old Irish glossary miscalled O'Mulcontry's (pp. 79–104)
- Duíl Laithne, by Dubhaltach
- a fragmentary glossary (pp. 41–43)
- a copy of O'Davoren's Glossary (pp. 45–68) by his grandfather, "a better copy than that in B.L. MS. Eg. 88", at Park, County Galway, in 1569.

This is followed by eighteen pages in Dubhlatach's handwriting, which

"... has all the appearance of a student's copybook or roughwork book ... Most of the page [page 77] is covered with all kinds of scribbling, much of it in the nature of probationes pennae which are difficult to make sence of, or, in many cases, even to read ... it is difficult to make any sence of much of it, and matters are not helped by the employment of some rather unusual tachygrams."

The Sanas Cormac covers pages 79 to 103, followed on pages 104 to 106 by a fragment of an etymological tract as far as the letter C, then an imperfect copy of the Uraicipt attributed to Cenn Fáelad mac Aillila on pages 107 to 134. Pages 79 to 126, and 126b to 133, are in the handwriting of Dubhaltach's grandfather, Dubhaltach Mór.

Dubhaltach himself added a great many marginal notes in Irish, Latin, and on a few occasions, in Greek, using Greek lettering.
