= Colman of Templeshambo =

Irish Catholic saint

Saint Colman of Templeshambo
- Died: c. 595
- Venerated in: Roman Catholicism
- Feast: 27 October

Saint Colman of Templeshambo (also called Templeshanbo) was a Catholic saint from Connacht, Ireland. He has been confused with the patron of Kilmacduagh, but he lived somewhat earlier, and the sphere of his ministry lay in the present County Wexford.

== Life ==
Colman was the son of Eochaidh Brec, and Fearamhla. He was a contemporary of Máedóc of Ferns (also known as Áedan), who appointed him Abbot of Templeshambo, the mother church of Enniscorthy. It was anciently called "Shanbo-Colman" (Colman's old tent or booth) from St. Colman O'Ficra, the founder and patron, who lived in the seventh century, and who was held in great veneration there during the long lapse of years that the monastery continued to flourish after his death.

== St. Colman's Teals ==
Many legends are told of Saint Colman and of his holy well with its sacred ducks. In former days a large pond supplied from the well, where for ages after St. Colman's death a number of ducks were kept, which were believed to be under the saint's special protection, and on this account were regarded with affection and treated with great tenderness. They were quite tame and took food from the hand, never flying away at the approach of pilgrims, and never avoiding the gentle familiarities of the people.

Nothing could harm them: and the legend tells in particular that it was impossible to cook them. As they were so tame, persons fetching water from the pond on a dark night sometimes by an unlucky chance brought one of them away in the vessel without knowing it, and threw the contents, bird and all, into a pot over a fire to be boiled. Whenever this happened no matter how the people heaped on wood, or how long the fire was kept up, the water still remained as cold as when it was taken from the pond; and in the end the little duck was found not in the least harmed, swimming about unconcernedly on the top. It was of course brought back to the pond: and after this the water in the pot got heated and boiled without further trouble.

Gerald of Wales, in his Topography of Ireland, recorded some of these stories about the saint's sacred teals, which could not be harmed: illustrations on the lower part of Gerald's relevant manuscript depict the teals taking food from a human, a kite paralysed while attempting to take one of the teals as prey, and a fox choking on one of the birds. He is said to have laboured zealously at the foot of Mount Leinster in the Blackstairs Mountains, his monastery being known as Temple Sean Bothe. He died c. 595 on October 27, which is his feast day, as recorded in the "Martyrology of Donegal".
