= Dairthech =

Type of church building in Gaelic Ireland

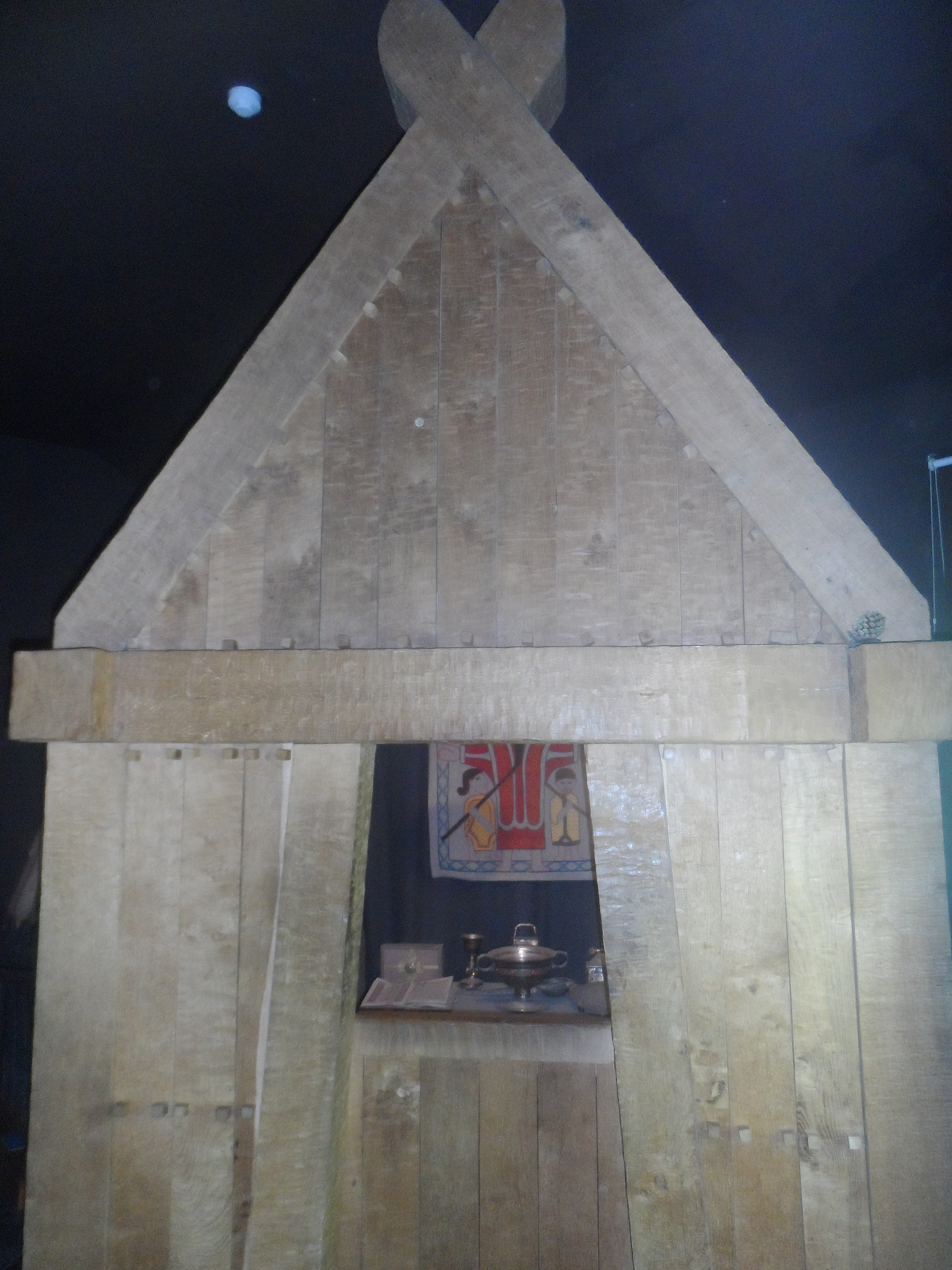
Replica of a dairthech at Clonmacnoise

In Gaelic Ireland, between the 5th and 9th centuries AD, a dairthech (literally "oak-house") was a type of oratory or church built of oak-wood.

== Histories ==
The dairthech was the earliest kind of church built in Ireland, from the earliest Christian times (5th century AD) onward. They were gradually replaced by stone churches.

== Structure ==
A typical dairthech was rectangular, measuring 4.5 m (15 ft) by 3 m (9.8 ft). Some were wider up to 4.5 m (15 ft), and congregations of 150–260 people are recorded. It had a high pointed gable. Oak was used as a building material as a holdover from Celtic religion, where the oak was imbued with magical powers.

=== Internal structure ===
Little is known about the internal structure of the dairthech, although descriptions of the murder of Echtigern in Kildare in AD 760 offer a few hints, mentioning a chancel-screen (Old Irish: cróchaingel) and altar (altóir). Cogitosus describes painted partitions dividing clergy from laity and women from men.
