= Bretha Nemed Déidenach =

Bretha Nemed Déidenach is the late title of an Early Irish law text dating from the eighth century.

== Overview ==
Bretha Nemed Déidenach ('the last Bretha Nemed') is one of the two principal surviving remnants of the celebrated Old Irish Bretha Nemed law school, believed to have been composed early in the eighth century in Munster. The only surviving copy, now part of Trinity College, Dublin MS 1317 H.2.15B, was transcribed by Dubhaltach MacFhirbhisigh. Another related text, Bretha Nemed Toísech (the first Bretha Nemed) is now British Library MS Nero A 7.

Bretha Nemed Déidenach contains extracts of works concerning poets and bards, along with passages on such subjects as fosterage, sureties, pledge-interests and land law. Much of it is written in the alliterative rosc style in what is now called Archaic or Old Irish. Because of the difficulty of the language, the text has never been translated. In addition, in parts the text is fragmentary.

It is not known where MacFhirbhisigh obtained his exemplar, nor when or where it was transcribed. Another text in the same MS – Duil Laithne – was written at Ballymacegan, County Tipperary, on 5 May 1643, so the Déidenach may have been copied in that period.

== See also ==
- Old Irish
- Cáin Adomnáin
- Derbfine
- Collectio canonum Hibernensis

== Editions and translation ==
- Binchy, D.A., ed. (1978). Corpus Iuris Hibernici. 6 vols. Dublin: DIAS. pp. 603.16–604.38 (excerpts in H 3.18), 725.7–726.20 (H 3.18), 1111.1–1138.37 (MS 1317), 2342.16–2343.21 (?). ISBN 185500108X. Diplomatic edition.
- Gwynn, E.J., ed. (1942). "An Old Irish Tract on the Privileges and Responsibilities of Poets". Ériu. 13: 1–60 and 220–36. Critical edition.

Portions of the text are translated in:

- Watkins, Calvert (1963). "Indo-European metrics and archaic Irish verse." Celtica 6: 194–249: 226, 230, 233, 236, 240.
- Ó Corráin, Donnchadh, Liam Breatnach and Aidan Breen (1984). "The laws of the Irish." Peritia 3. 382–438: 420–2.
- Breatnach, Liam (1987). Uraicecht na Ríar. The Poetic Grades in Early Irish law. Early Irish Law Series 2. Dublin. 42–57.
