= Library of Trinity College Dublin =

Library in Dublin, Ireland

The Library of Trinity College Dublin
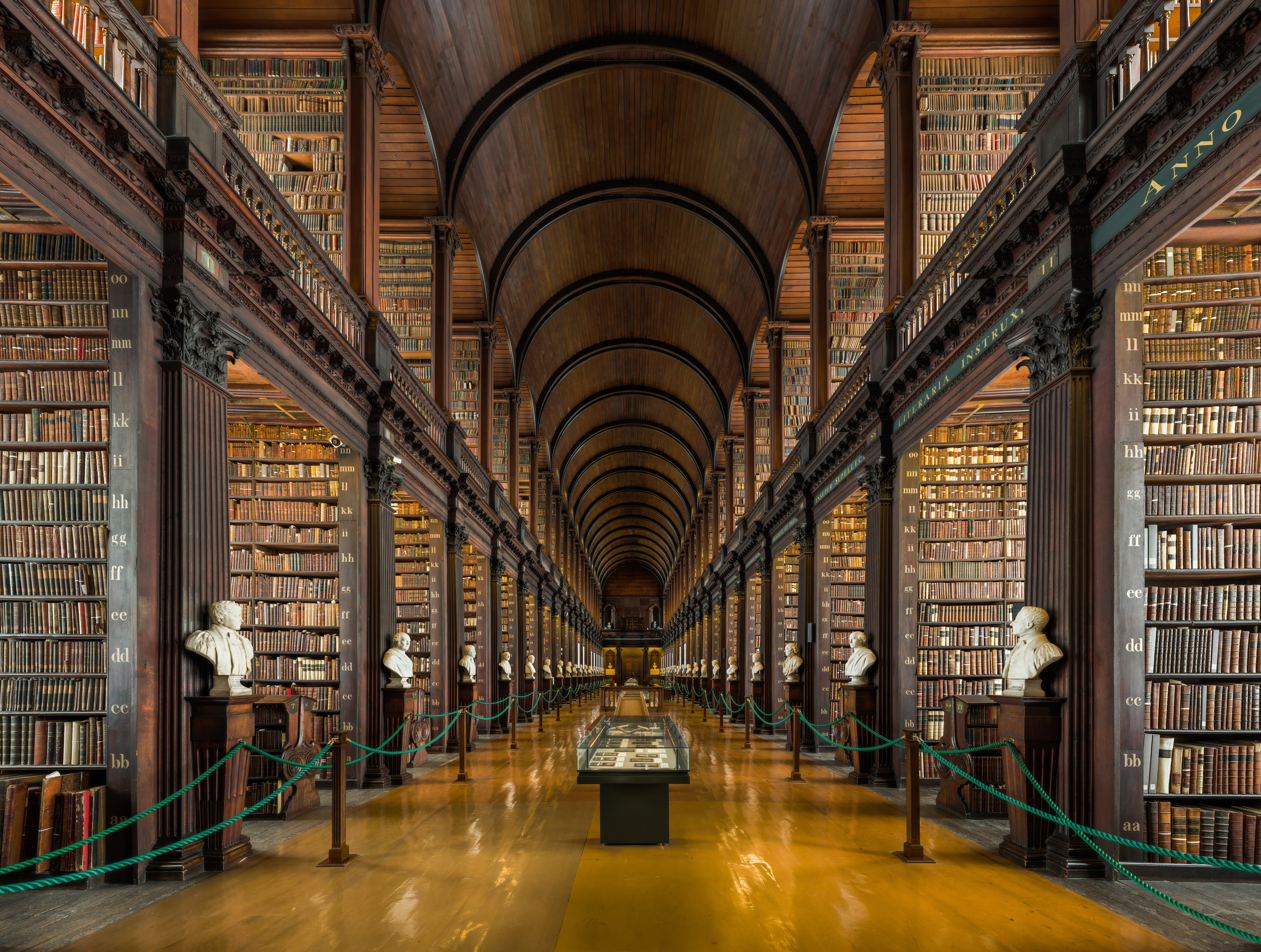
- The Long Room in the Old Library
- 53°20′38″N 6°15′24.5″W
- Location: College Street, Dublin 2, Ireland
- Type: Academic library
- Established: 1592

Collection
- Items collected: Books, journals, newspapers, magazines, sound and music recordings, databases, maps, prints and manuscripts
- Size: c. 7,000,000 volumes
- Criteria for collection: Acquisition through purchase, bequest and legal deposit
- Legal deposit: Republic of Ireland (Copyright and Related Rights Act, 2000) and United Kingdom (Legal Deposit Libraries Act 2003)

Access and use
- Access requirements: Staff, graduates (reading privileges only) and students of the university. Other readers admitted under cross-institutional arrangements, or if material is unavailable elsewhere. Old Library and Library Gift Shop open to public

Other information
- Director: College Librarian and Archivist Helen Shenton
- Employees: Around 120
- Website: www.tcd.ie/library/

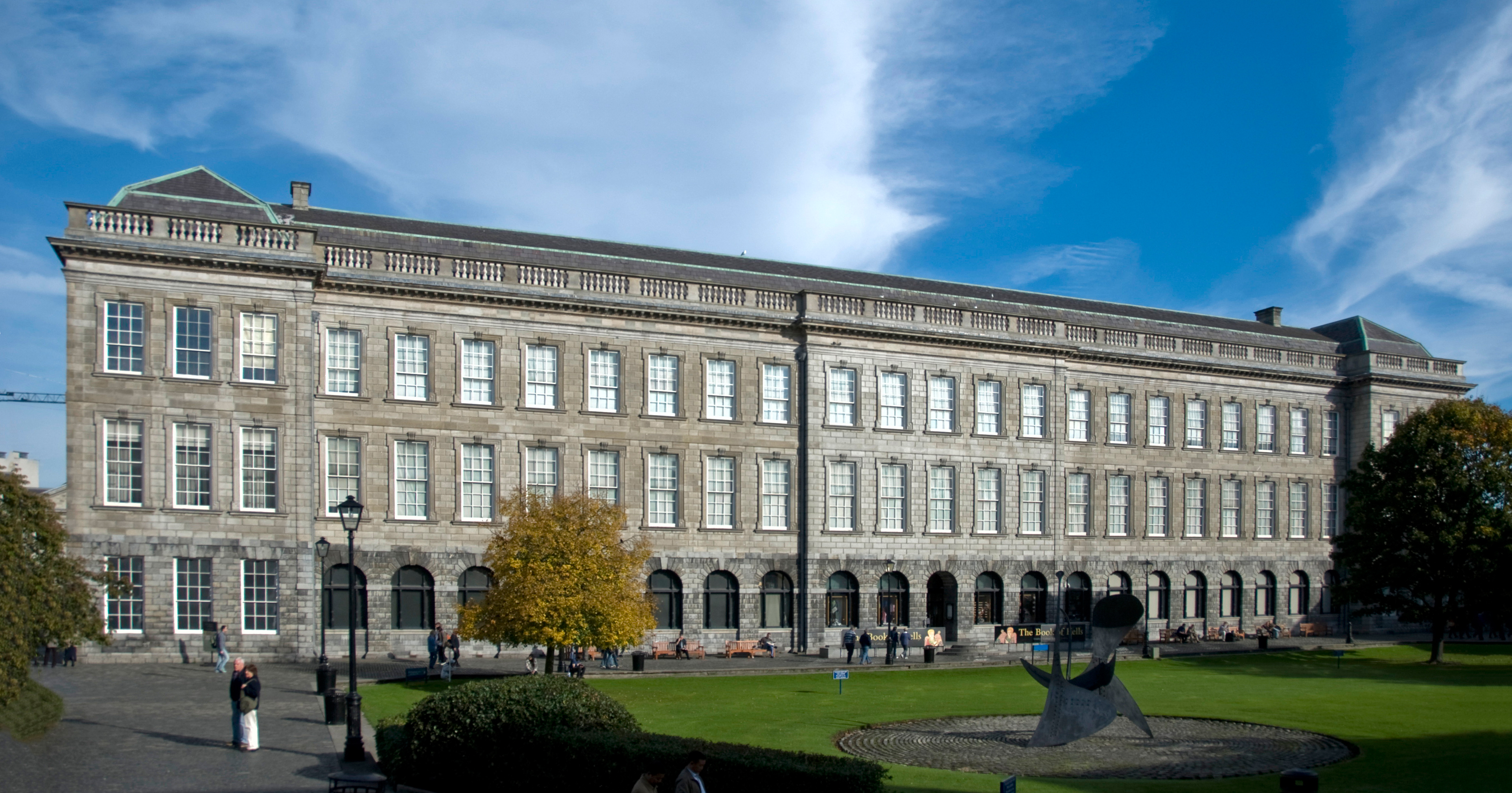
The Old Library Building

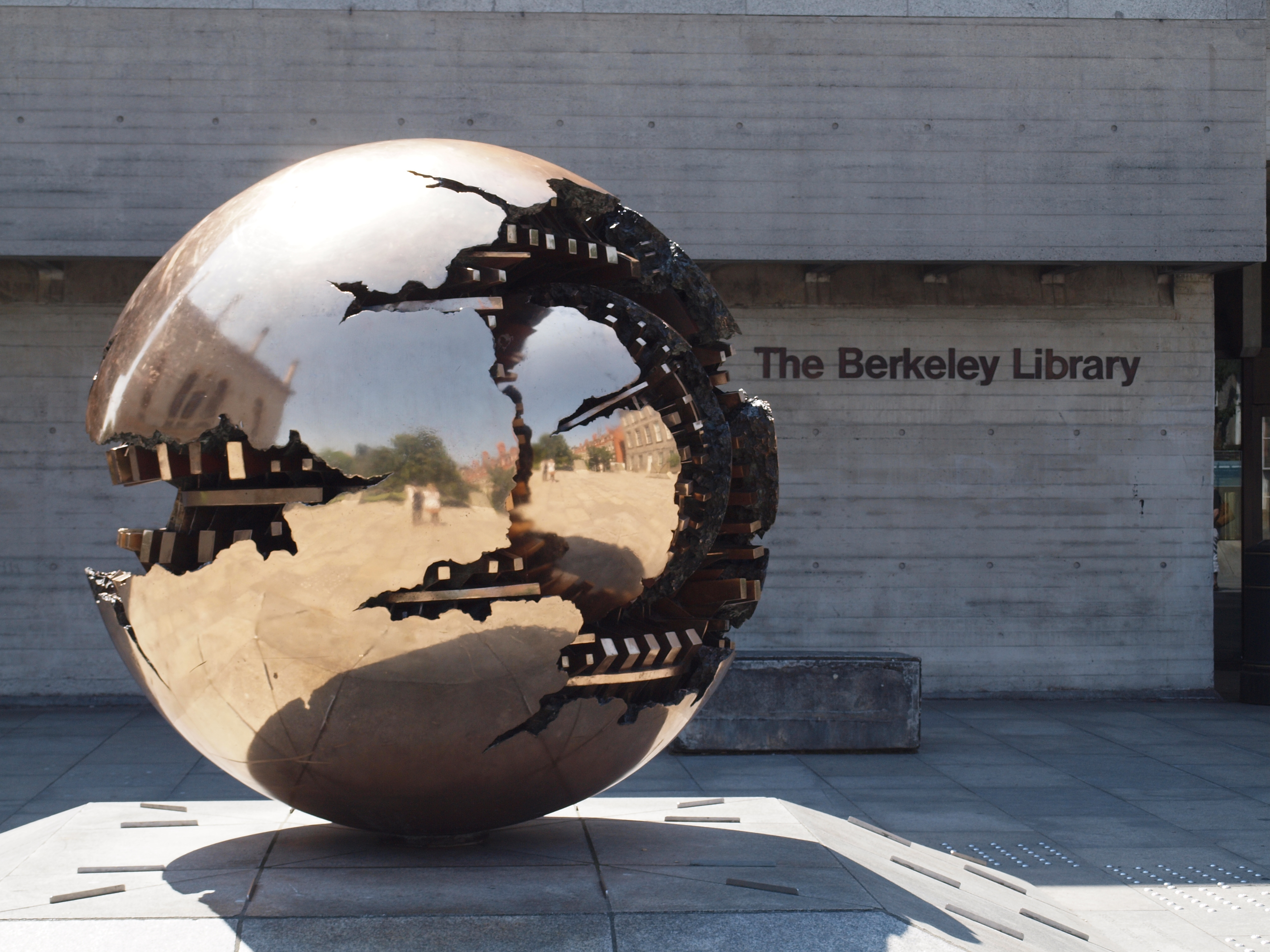
Arnaldo Pomodoro's Sfera con Sfera (Sphere Within Sphere) at The Berkeley Library

The Library of Trinity College Dublin (Irish: Leabharlann Choláiste na Tríonóide) is the main library that serves Trinity College, and is the largest library in Ireland. It is a legal deposit or "copyright library", which means that publishers in Ireland must deposit a copy of all their publications there without charge. It is the only Irish library to also hold such rights for works published in the United Kingdom. It consists of The Old Library, which was constructed during the 18th century, and the "Long Room", which is one of the most iconic landmarks of the university. A major tourist attraction housing numerous Irish artifacts and documents, it contains the 8th-century manuscript known as the Book of Kells, which arrived at the college in 1661.

The Old Library is also the permanent home to the Brian Boru harp, a national symbol of Ireland, as well as a copy of the 1916 Proclamation of the Irish Republic. One of the four volumes of the Book of Kells is on public display at any given time. The volumes and pages shown are regularly changed; a new display case installed in 2020 facilitated all pages to be displayed, including many which had not been seen in public for several decades. Members of the University of Dublin also have access to the libraries of Tallaght University Hospital and the Irish School of Ecumenics, Milltown.

== Constituent buildings ==
The library proper occupies several buildings, six of which are at the Trinity College campus itself, with another part of the Trinity Centre at St James's Hospital, Dublin and more held at the College's book repository in Santry:

- The Old Library, is one of Thomas Burgh's magnum opus. Construction began in 1712. A large building which took twenty years to complete in its original form, it towered over the university and city after its completion in 1732. Even today, surrounded by similarly scaled buildings, it is imposing and dominates the view of the university from Nassau Street. The Book of Kells is located in the Old Library, along with the Book of Durrow, the Garland of Howth and other ancient texts. Also incorporating the Long Room, the Old Library is one of Ireland's biggest tourist attractions and holds thousands of rare, and in many cases very early, volumes. In the 18th century, the college received the Brian Boru harp, one of the three surviving medieval Gaelic harps, and a national symbol of Ireland, which is now housed in the Library.
- The Library Complex, incorporating:
  - The Eavan Boland Library, in Fellows' Square. Designed by Paul Koralek of ABK Architects, an imposing Brutalist structure opened in 1967 as the "New Library". It was renamed after George Berkeley in 1978. In April 2023, the college decided to "dename" the library due to Berkeley owning and working slaves on his property in Rhode Island. The library was renamed after Boland in October 2024. Previous to the renaming, Trinity asked members of the public to vote on a figure for the library to be named in honour of. Wolfe Tone won the poll with 31% of the vote, while Boland netted 7%. Trinity subsequently chose to ignore the vote.
  - The Lecky Library, attached to the Arts Building. Also designed by ABK, officially opened in 1978.
  - The James Ussher Library, overlooking College Park. Designed by McCullough Mulvin Architects, officially opened in 2003.
    - This includes the Interim Research Collections Study Centre and Kinsella Hall, a 24-hour study space.
  - The Glucksman Map Library.
  - The Preservation and Conservation Department.
- The Hamilton Science and Engineering Library, located within the Hamilton Building.
- The 1937 Reading Room (for postgraduate use).
- The John Stearne Medical Library (JSML), housed at St James's Hospital.

Further materials are held in storage in Stacks, either in closed access within the College or at a book depository in the Dublin suburb of Santry.

== History ==
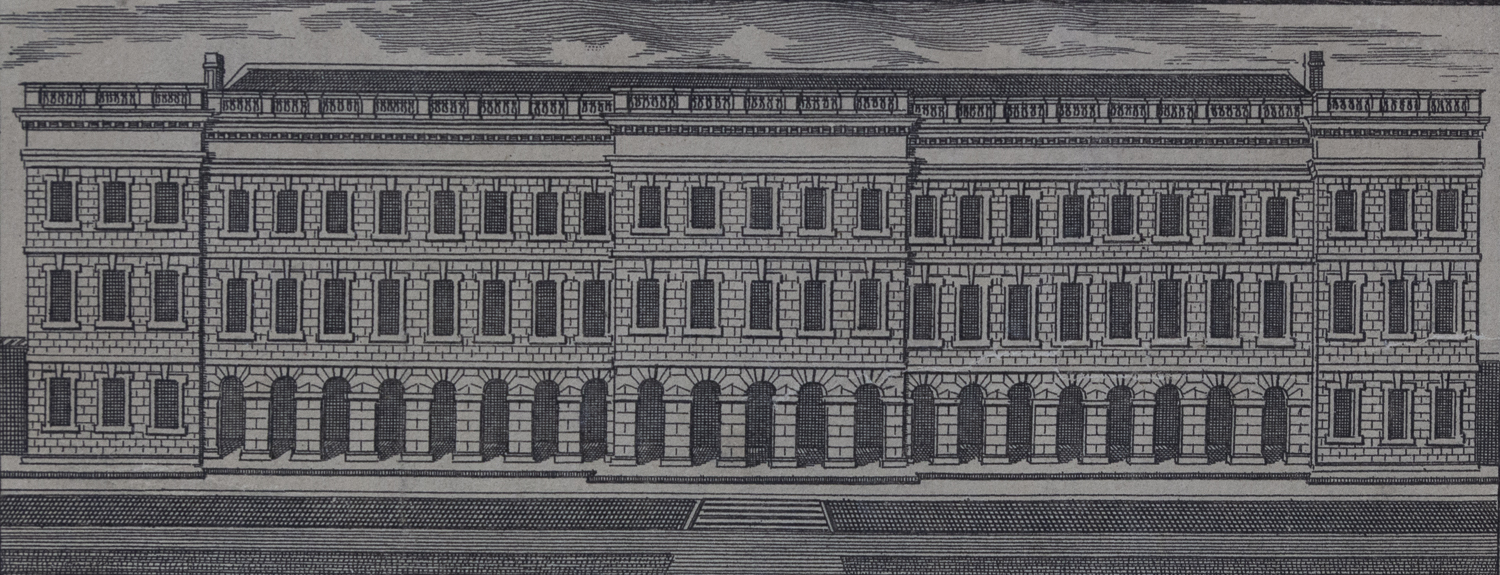
An image of the Colledge Library (sic), taken from Charles Brooking's map of Dublin (1728).

The Library began with the founding of Trinity College in 1592. In 1661, Henry Jones presented it with the Book of Kells, its most famous manuscript.

James Ussher (1625–56), Archbishop of Armagh, whose most important works were Veterum Epistolarum Hibernicarum Sylloge (1632) and Brittanicarum Ecclesiarum Antiquitates (1639), left his valuable library, comprising several thousand printed books and manuscripts, to the Library. His complete works were published by the Library in twenty-four volumes.

In 1712, building began on the construction of the library building. Records show that a type of limestone was used, extracted from a quarry in Palmerstown, located some 8 km to the west. Patrick Wyse Jackson, curator of the Geological Museum at Trinity, assessed the Old Library in 1993, and made the following observations:

"The Old Library was built between 1712 and 1732... The lower storey is built of muddy, well-bedded Calp Limestone, cut into regular rusticated ashlar blocks, which were quarried at Palmerstown... This rock is quite fossiliferous and contains tiny cubic crystals of iron pyrites or 'fool's gold'... The Calp has weathered to a pleasant, warm, brownish colour which contrasts well with the grey Ballyknockan Granite of the upper storeys. Originally these levels were faced with white St Bees Sandstone from Whitehaven in Cumbria, but this disintegrated quickly and all but the carved cornice was replaced."

In 1801, the Library was given legal deposit rights, making it the only library in Ireland to have such rights for the United Kingdom at that time.

In August 2025, Trinity College Dublin Library was ranked first in a global literary tourism initiative called "1000 Libraries".

== Legal deposit library status ==
In accordance with the Copyright and Related Rights Act 2000, the library is entitled, along with the National Library of Ireland and the libraries of the National University of Ireland, the University of Limerick, and Dublin City University, to receive a copy of all works published in the Republic of Ireland.

Also, as a result of the British Legal Deposit Libraries Act 2003, which continues a more ancient right dating from 1801, the Library is entitled, along with the Bodleian Library at Oxford, Cambridge University Library, the National Library of Wales and the National Library of Scotland, to receive a copy on request of all works published in the United Kingdom. Many works are now being received electronically rather than in print under new UK regulations which came into force in April 2013.

== Long Room ==
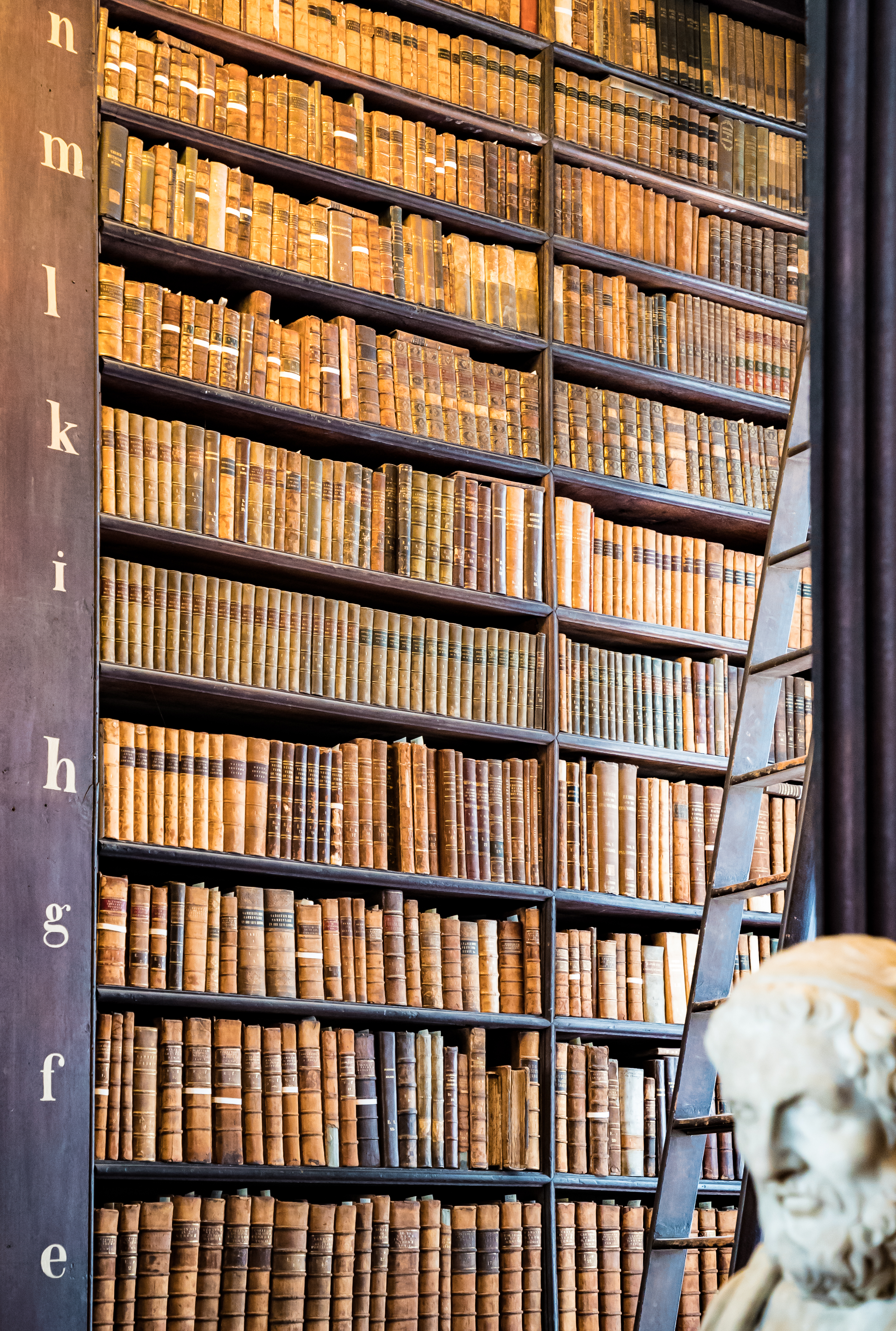
Detail of Long Room shelving

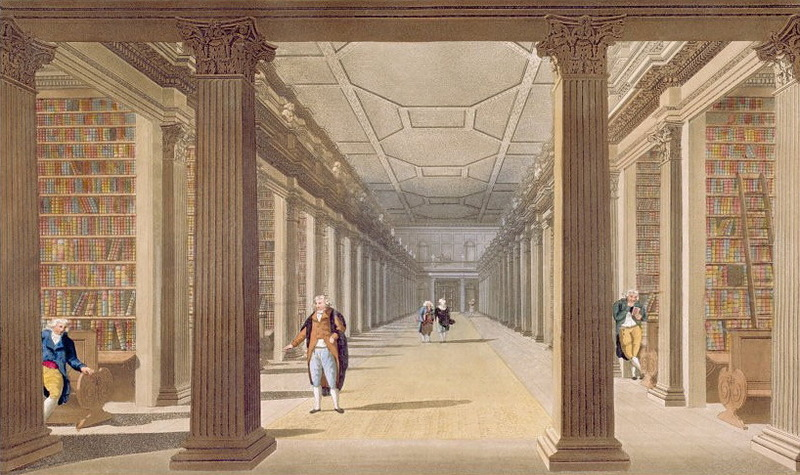
Watercolour of Long Room before the roof was raised

The 65-metre-long (213 ft) main chamber of the Old Library, the Long Room, was built between 1712 and 1732 and houses 200,000 of the Library's oldest books. Initially, The Long Room had a flat ceiling, shelving for books only on the lower level, and an open gallery. By the 1850s the room had to be expanded as the shelves were filled due to the fact that the Library had been given permission to obtain a free copy of every book that had been published in Ireland and Britain. In 1860, The Long Room's roof was raised to accommodate an upper gallery. The Long Room is lined with marble busts. The marble bust collection was formed when 14 busts from the sculptor Peter Scheemakers were acquired by the college. Many of the busts are of great philosophers, writers, and men who supported the college. The most outstanding bust in the collection is of the writer Jonathan Swift, created by Louis François Roubiliac.

In November 2020, Trinity College announced the addition of four marble busts featuring female scholars: Rosalind Franklin, Ada Lovelace, Augusta Gregory, and Mary Wollstonecraft. Notably, it is "the first time in over a century that Trinity has commissioned new sculptures for the Long Room of the Old Library." Following the unveiling, Trinity archivist Helen Shenton remarked, "As the first woman Librarian in the College's 428-year history, I am especially delighted to champion this initiative to address the historic inequity in the Long Room."

The Long Room also holds one of the last remaining copies of the 1916 Proclamation of the Irish Republic. This proclamation was read by Patrick Pearse near the General Post Office on 24 April 1916. Visitors may also view the Trinity College harp (also known as the "Brian Boru harp") in the Long Room which is the oldest of its kind in Ireland dating back to the 15th century. The harp is made out of oak and willow and includes 29 brass strings. The library was broken into and the Trinity College harp was stolen in March of 1969. The Harp was recovered by police a month later and returned to the library.

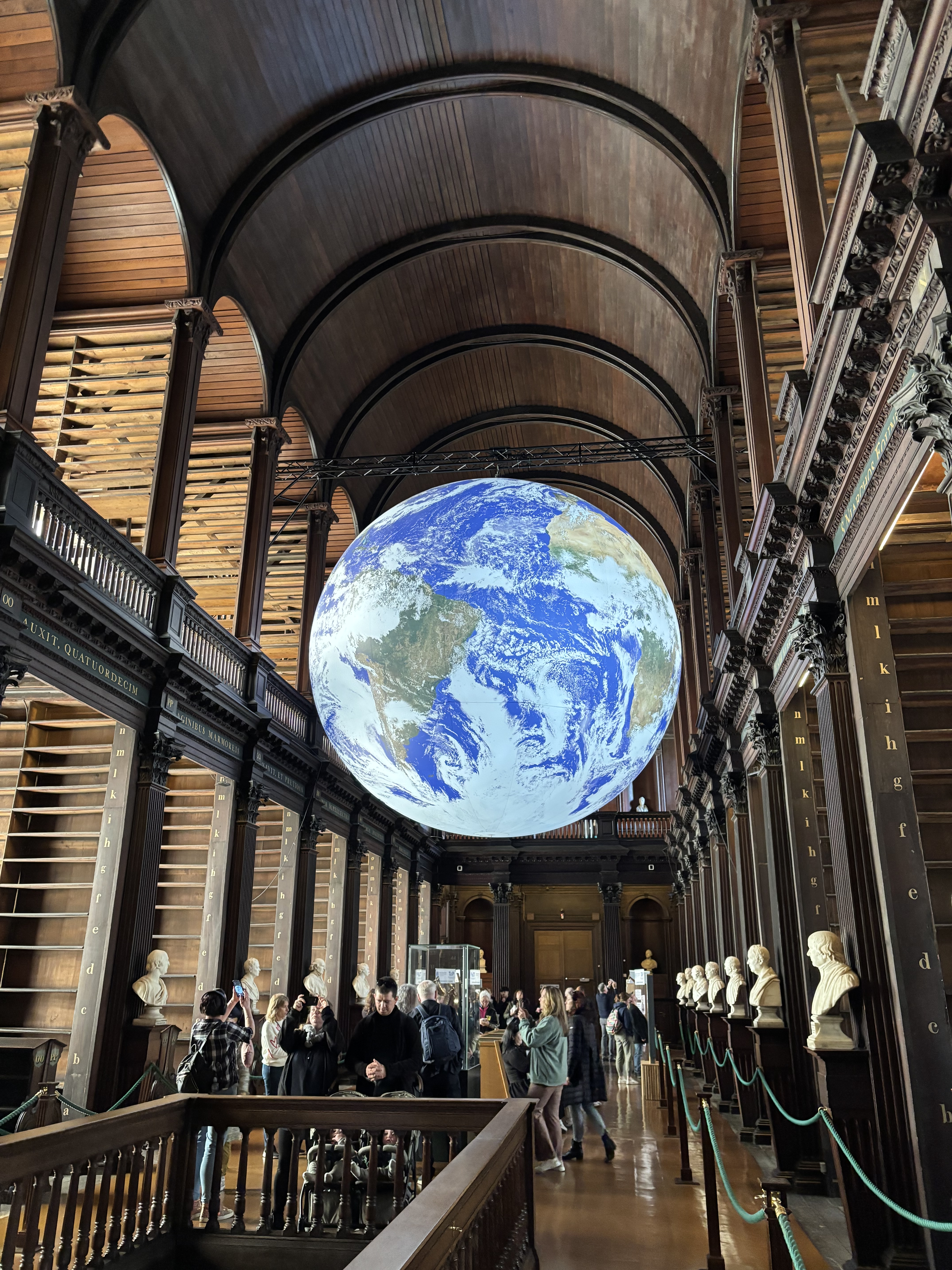
“Gaia” artwork hanging in the Long Room

Beginning in 2022, the Long Room has undergone a €90m restoration project, utilizing €25m of government funding. The project is said to have "taken on a degree of urgency following the catastrophic fire which destroyed Notre-Dame de Paris cathedral in 2019." Accordingly, the project prioritizes the modernization of environmental control and fire protection measures. In 2023 a large illuminated globe was hung in the Long Room. The artwork, called “Gaia,” was treated by British artist Luke Jerram.

=== In popular culture ===
The Jedi archives of the Jedi Temple in the movie Star Wars: Episode II – Attack of the Clones bear a startling resemblance to the Long Room of the Trinity College Library. This resemblance resulted in controversy as permission had not been sought to use the building's likeness in the film. However, Lucasfilm denied that the Long Room was the basis for the Jedi archives, and officials from Trinity College Library decided not to take any legal action.

In the Foundation TV series the Long Room was a stand-in for a reading room in the imperial capital of Trantor.

== See also ==
- List of libraries in the Republic of Ireland
