= Kritarchy =

Ancient Israelite system of rule by Biblical judges

Kritarchy, also called kritocracy, was the system of rule by Hebrew Bible judges in ancient Israel. Since then multiple polities have existed where judges exercised control over the governance of the polity in one form or another. More recently commentators have warned of various democratic systems becoming systems where the judiciary in effect make political decisions over legislatures and executives.

== Etymology ==
Because the term kritarchy is a compound of the ancient Greek words κριτής, krites ("judge") and ἄρχω, árkhō ("to rule"), its colloquial use has expanded from meaning rule by Hebrew Bible judges to cover rule by judges in the modern sense as well. To contrast such a rule by (modern) judges with that of the Hebrew Bible judges, South African judge Albie Sachs coined the term dikastocracy for it, from δικαστής ("judge"), rejecting the coinage juristocracy for being an admixture of Latin and Greek. The word jurocracy has also been used by others.

== Definitions ==
=== Contrast to extant system ===
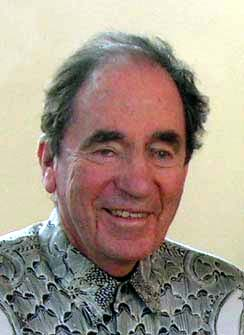
Albie Sachs, a former justice of the Constitutional Court of South Africa

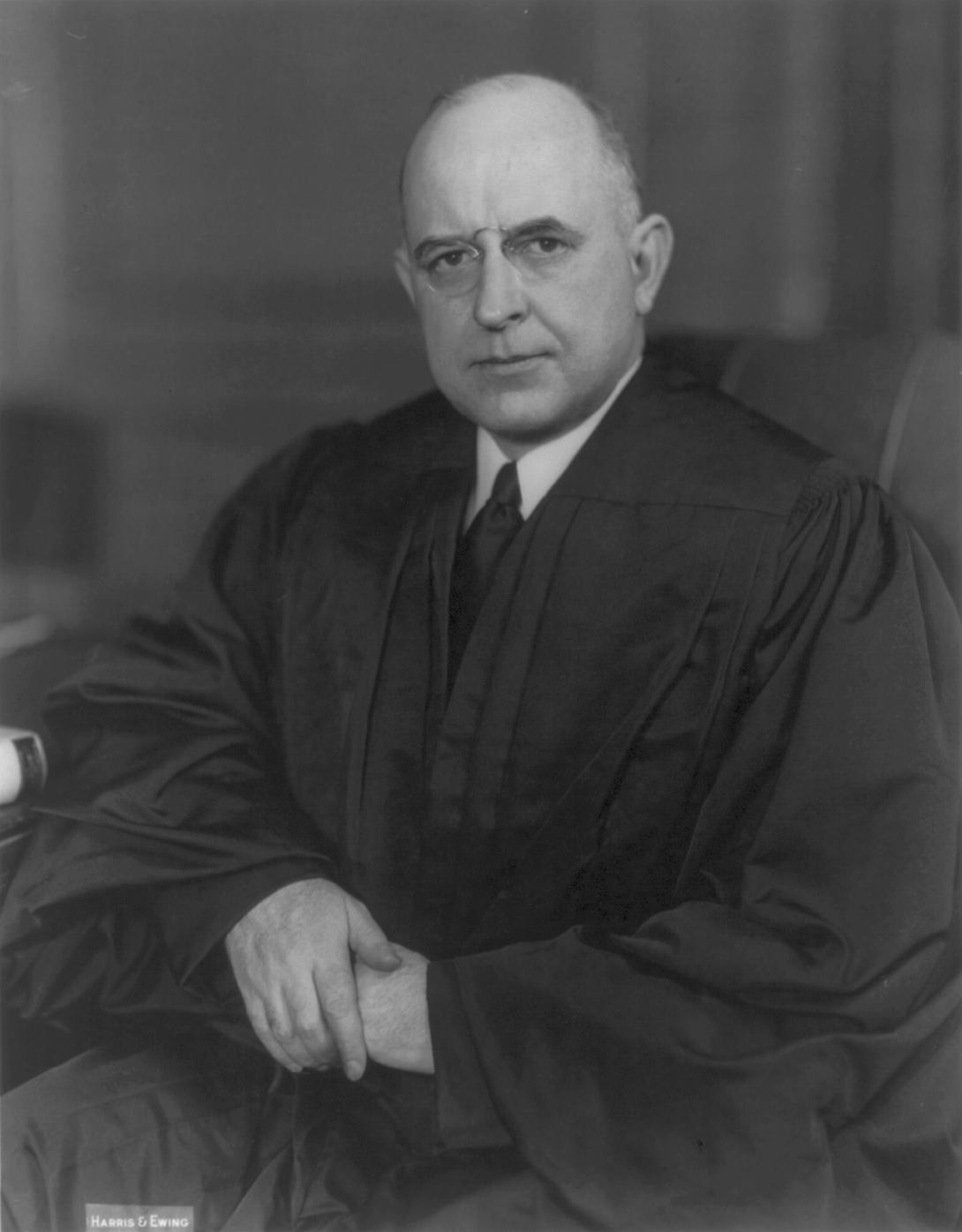
Stanley Reed, a former associate justice of the U.S. Supreme Court

Sachs and others rejected the idea that the Constitutional Court of South Africa, on which he sat, was a dikastocracy; using the name to denote what they asserted the Court not to be. It was used in a 1996 Court opinion that rejected the "horizontal" application (between citizens as opposed to "vertical" application between citizens and the government) of the RSA constitution's Bill of Rights and warned that "horizontal" application would turn the republic into such a dikastocracy.

Others have similarly used this as an inverse definition to denote what they assert their form of government is not. Supreme Court of the United States justice Stanley Forman Reed, the last dissenter to be convinced in the decision on Brown v. Board of Education used kritarchy as the name for the judicial activism that he initially dissented from, asking his clerk (John Fassett) who argued with the direction to write a dissenting opinion whether he (Fassett) favoured a kritarchy. Fassett was unfamiliar with the word, and Reed told him to look it up. Fassett could not find it in several dictionaries, finally locating it in the Oxford English Dictionary.

The actual term that Reed used was "krytocracy" and he described it as a "government by judges".

=== According to van Notten ===
This form of rule (in the non-Biblical sense) is the case of Somalia, ruled by judges with the polycentric legal tradition of xeer. The definition employed by Michael van Notten (based upon one by Frank van Dun) is not, strictly, that of rule by judges, judges not being a formal political class but rather people selected at random to perform that task ad hoc; but rather is that of a legal and political system whose closest analogue in other societies is that of a system based entirely upon customary rather than statutory law. George Ayittey referred to this as a "near-Kritarchy". Van Notten himself argues that with few exceptions, the system of government which he denotes a kritarchy is "harmonious with the concept of natural law" and "very close to what in philosophy might be called 'the natural order of human beings'".

=== Heterodox opinions ===
In the opinion of libertarian anthropologist Spencer McCallum, the kritarchy represents the governance of stateless societies, explaining that Somali tribal governments were made up of courts and part-time police.

== Potential kritarchies ==
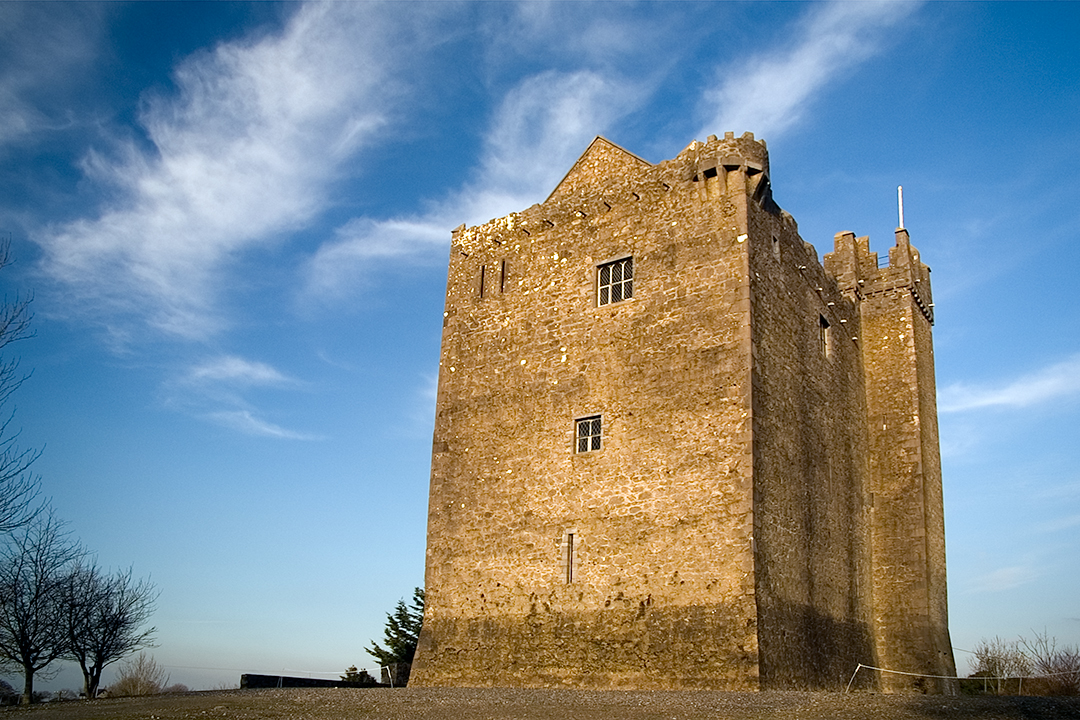
Redwood Castle, County Tipperary, although built by the Normans, was later occupied by the MacEgan juristic family and served as a school of Irish law under them.

Many legal scholars and commentators have spoken of the potential for systems to move to a form of kritarchy, viewing such in a negative light. A specific example is the Constitution of the Philippines which allows for direct rule by the Supreme Court should the Executive commit a "grave abuse", which is not defined in law.

== Historical examples ==
The Judicates (Sardinian: Judicadus) of Sardinia.

The period in ancient Israel where it was ruled by Hebrew Bible judges (Hebrew: שׁוֹפְטִים, romanized: Šop̄əṭim, shophetim), started by Moses according to the Book of Exodus, is the origin of the term kritarchy. This period occurred before the establishment of a united monarchy under Saul.

Ireland had a system of kritarchy from the 5th century BCE to the 5th century CE under the Brehon Law, the Brehons being the class of judges keeping an oral tradition of secular law from pre-Christian Ireland. A kritarchy system was also present in medieval Ireland until the 13th century.

The Icelandic Commonwealth between the 9th and 13th century has been labelled as a kritarchy by David D. Friedman and Einar Olgeirsson. Richard Cole additionally highlights how in the language of the Völuspá from the Snorra Edda composed during this period described the rule of the Æsir less in royal terminology and more as judges ruling by law.

The Sardinian medieval kingdoms, also called the Judicates, existed from the 10th to 14th centuries. These kingdoms were ruled by judike (judges).

Frisia, at the end of the Frisian freedom, in the 16th century had a system of kritarchy.

The Islamic Courts Union from 1994 to 2006 in Somalia followed the legal system of xeer.

== In popular culture ==
- The fictional regime of Mega-city One, the focus of setting for the Judge Dredd franchise, can be described as a kritarchy.

== See also ==
- List of counties of Nova Scotia#History
