= Xeer =

Somali customary legal system

Xeer (pronounced [ħeːr]) is the traditional legal system used by Somalis in Djibouti, Somalia, Somaliland, Somali Region of Ethiopia, and the North Eastern Province in Kenya. It is one of the three systems from which formal Somali law draws its inspiration, the others being civil law and Islamic law. It is believed to pre-date Islam. However, Islam influenced it, with Xeer incorporating many Islamic legal principles. Under this system, the elders, known as the xeer begti, serve as mediator judges and help settle court cases, taking precedent and custom into account. Xeer is polycentric in that different groups within Somali society have different interpretations of xeer.

== Application of xeer ==
Somali society is traditionally structured around a patriarchal clan based system, subdivided into sub-clans, then lineages, and finally mag groupings. These groups are bound together either by family ties or contract. Xeer justice usually revolves around the latter groups, as these are the smallest. In these groups, each member is responsible aiding in the payment for the crimes of another and must accordingly bear some fraction of any decided punishment if the accused cannot afford to do so themselves. Within this system, only the victim or immediate family of a victim can bring criminal proceedings to xeer mediation. If the victim is a man, his father, brothers, or uncles can bring complaints. If the victim is a woman, complaints can be brought forward by the men in her family or the men in her husband's family.

In xeer, crimes are transgressions against property rights. Justice is directed in the form of material compensation to the victim. If the accused is found guilty, some material restitution must be paid. If restitution cannot be given, mag retribution is due, measured in terms of livestock (usually healthy female camels), to be paid to the victim or the victim's family. There is no concept of imprisonment under xeer. In some cases, elders may advise that neither side seeks restitution or retribution. The verdict is enforced by the victim's family or else by all able-bodied clansmen within the area wherein the verdict is to be executed.

Xeer judges are made up of the heads of extended families. These family heads are chosen for their knowledge of the law and wisdom, but otherwise, there is no formal training, and each judge is allowed to formulate their own doctrines and legal principles. Multiple judges are chosen to preside over each case by the involved parties, with this delegation being called an "ergo". The number of judges involved in a case is usually around ten, though it can be as few as two.

In each case, the goal is to reach consensus between the parties. Arbitration traditionally takes place under a large tree, and the mediators ask each party to submit to the judge's ruling. In modern times, meeting halls are often used instead of sitting under a tree. Each party has the right to appoint a representative to speak on its behalf while a recorder loudly repeats any important points that are made. If a fact is disputed, its veracity must be obtained by the testimony of three witnesses. If this cannot be done, an oath must be sworn. Should proceedings become heated, the presiding judge may order a recess, wherein both parties discuss issues relating to the case in small informal groups. Once the mediation has been decided, an appeal may be requested, although all parties must agree.

== Principles of xeer ==
Different groups within Somali society undertake oral agreements with each other to define xeer law. Despite this informal nature, there is a series of generally accepted principles, agreements, and ideas that constitute xeer, referred to collectively as "xissi adkaaday". These are:

- the payment of mag by the collective group (clan, sub-clan, lineage, or mag group) from which an offender originates as compensation for the crimes of murder, bodily assault, theft, rape, and defamation of character, given to the victim or victim's family;
- the protection of vulnerable or respected members of society such as older adults, women, children, poets, guests and religious people
- obligations to the family such as the payment of a dowry to a bride
- the rights of a widower to marry the dead wife's sister and the inheritance of a widow by the dead man's brother
- the punishments for elopement
- and the division and use of natural resources like water and land.

== Xeer in Somaliland ==
Xeer is recognised along with British common law in the law of Somaliland.

== See also ==
- Adat (Malays of Nusantara)
- Anglo-Saxon law (England)
- Gadaa (Oromo)
- Aqsaqal (Central Asia)
- Coutume (France)
- Customary Aboriginal law (Australia)
- Customary law
- Early Germanic law
- Early Irish law (Ireland)
- Frith-borh
- Kanun (Albania)
- Kritarchy
- Laws of the Brets and Scots (Scotland)
- Medieval Scandinavian laws
- Pashtunwali and Jirga (Pashtuns of Pakistan and Afghanistan)
- Smriti and Ācāra (India)
- Urf – Arabic Islamic term meaning societal custom or knowledge
- Vlach law (Romanians)
- Welsh Law (Wales)

== Sources ==
- Abdile, Mahdi (2012). Customary Dispute Resolution in Somalia. African Conflict & Peacebuilding Review, Volume 2, Number 1: 87–110.
- Gladitz, Nicola. Somalia: A Tradition of Law
- Notten, Michael van (2005). The Law of the Somalis: A Stable Foundation for Economic Development in the Horn of Africa.
