= Philosophy of human rights =

Branch of philosophy

The philosophy of human rights attempts to examine the underlying basis of the concept of human rights and critically looks at its content and justification. Several theoretical approaches have been advanced to explain how and why the concept of human rights developed.

A central point of disagreement among these approaches concerns the origins and justification of human rights. One longstanding tradition in Western philosophy grounds human rights in natural law, drawing on philosophical or religious principles. Human rights are also described as a sociological pattern of rule setting (as in the sociological theory of law and the work of Weber). These approaches include the notion that individuals in a society accept rules from legitimate authority in exchange for security and economic advantage (as in Rawls) – a social contract. The interest and will theories are prominent competing accounts of the function of rights in general, rather than comprehensive theories of the justification of human rights. Interest theories emphasise the role of rights in protecting interests, whereas will theories emphasise the control that right-holders exercise over duties owed to them. In the philosophy of human rights, further questions concern the justification and scope of protections against severe political, legal and social abuses, including their possible foundations in dignity, autonomy and fundamental human interests.

== Moral and legal rights ==
A central question in the philosophy of human rights concerns the relationship between moral rights and legal rights. Legal rights are recognised through legal systems, including national legislation and international treaties. Moral rights, by contrast, are understood as claims that can be justified independently of their recognition in law.

Philosophers disagree about whether human rights must ultimately be grounded in moral rights or whether their legal and political functions can provide an independent basis for their justification. This distinction raises the question of whether a person can possess a human right even when no existing legal system recognises or protects it.

== Natural rights ==
Natural law theories base human rights on a "natural" moral, religious or even biological order that is independent of transitory human laws or traditions.

Socrates and his philosophic heirs, Plato and Aristotle, posited the existence of natural justice or natural right (δίκαιον φυσικόν dikaion physikon; Latin ius naturale). Of these, Aristotle is often said to be the father of natural law, although evidence for this is due largely to the interpretations of his work by Thomas Aquinas.

The development of this tradition of natural justice into one of natural law is usually attributed to the Stoics.

Some of the early Church Fathers sought to incorporate the until then pagan concept of natural law into Christianity. Natural law theories have featured greatly in the philosophies of Thomas Aquinas, Francisco Suárez, Richard Hooker, Thomas Hobbes, Hugo Grotius, Samuel von Pufendorf, and John Locke.

In Jain philosophy, the principle of ahimsa (nonviolence) requires avoiding harm to living beings. Mahavira, traditionally regarded as Jainism's twenty-fourth Tirthankara, taught nonviolence as a central ethical principle.

In the 16th century, asked by the Spanish monarchs to investigate the legitimacy of claims to land dominion by the indios of Latin America, Francisco de Vitoria expounded a theory of natural rights, especially in his famous Relectio de Indis.

In the 17th century Thomas Hobbes founded a contractualist theory of legal positivism beginning from the principle that man in the state of nature, which is to say without a "commonwealth" (a state) is in a state of constant war one with the other and thus in fear of his life and possessions (there being no property nor right without a sovereign to define it). Hobbes asserted natural law as how a rational human, seeking to survive and prosper, would act; the first principle of natural law being to seek peace, in which is self-preservation. Natural law (which Hobbes accepted was a misnomer, there being no law without a commonwealth) was discovered by considering humankind's natural interests, whereas previous philosophers had said that natural rights were discovered by considering the natural law. In Hobbes' opinion, the only way natural law could prevail was for human beings to agree to create a commonwealth by submitting to the command of a sovereign, whether an individual or an assembly of individuals. In this lay the foundations of the theory of a social contract between the governed and the governor.

Hugo Grotius based his philosophy of international law on natural law. He wrote that "even the will of an omnipotent being cannot change or abrogate" natural law, which "would maintain its objective validity even if we should assume the impossible, that there is no God or that he does not care for human affairs." (De iure belli ac pacis, Prolegomeni XI). This is the famous argument etiamsi daremus (non esse Deum), that made natural law no longer dependent on theology.

John Locke incorporated natural law into many of his theories and philosophy, especially in Two Treatises of Government. Locke turned Hobbes' prescription around, saying that if the ruler went against natural law and failed to protect "life, liberty, and property," people could justifiably overthrow the existing state and create a new one.

The Belgian philosopher of law Frank Van Dun is one among those who are elaborating a secular conception of natural law in the liberal tradition. There are also emerging and secular forms of natural law theory that define human rights as derivative of the notion of universal human dignity.

"Dignity" is a key term for the discussion of human rights. The Universal Declaration of Human Rights does not justify its claims on any philosophical basis, but rather it simply appeals to human dignity.

Karl Rahner discusses human dignity as it relates to freedom. Specifically, his ideas of freedom relate to human rights as an appeal to the freedom to communicate with the divine. As embodied individuals who can have this freedom and dignity threatened by external forces, the protection of this dignity takes on an appeal to protect human rights.

The term "human rights" has replaced the term "natural rights" in popularity, because the rights are less and less frequently seen as requiring natural law for their existence. For some, the debate on human rights remains thus a debate around the correct interpretation of natural law, and human rights themselves a positive, but reductionist, expression thereof.

== Social contract ==
Social contract theories seek to explain the legitimacy of political authority through an agreement, whether actual or hypothetical, among members of a society. For Thomas Hobbes, the absence of a common authority creates insecurity and the risk of violent conflict. He argued that individuals have compelling reasons to establish a sovereign authority capable of maintaining peace and protecting them from one another.

John Locke also justified political government through consent, but argued that individuals possess natural rights to life, liberty and property independently of government. Political authority is established to protect these rights and promote the public good. A government that fails to fulfil these purposes may legitimately be resisted or replaced.

Jean-Jacques Rousseau, in The Social Contract, addressed the problem of reconciling individual freedom with political authority. He argued that legitimate laws must express the general will of the citizen body, allowing individuals to participate in collective self-government rather than remain subject to the arbitrary will of others.

== Reciprocity ==
The Golden Rule, or the ethic of reciprocity states that one must do unto others as one would be treated themselves; the principle being that reciprocal recognition and respect of rights ensures that one's own rights will be protected. This principle can be found in all the world's major religions in only slightly differing forms, and was enshrined in the "Declaration Toward a Global Ethic" by the Parliament of the World's Religions in 1993.

== Soviet concept of human rights ==
Soviet conceptions of human rights drew on Marxist–Leninist political and legal thought. Unlike natural-rights theories, which regard rights as existing independently of the state, Soviet legal doctrine generally treated citizens' rights as deriving from the socialist legal system.

Soviet approaches placed particular emphasis on economic and social rights, including employment, education, healthcare and housing. They also stressed collective interests and the responsibilities of individuals towards society, rather than treating rights primarily as protections against government interference.

Crime was determined not as the infraction of law, but as any action which could threaten the Soviet state and society. For example, a desire to make a profit could be interpreted as a counter-revolutionary activity punishable by death. The liquidation and deportation of millions peasants in 1928–31 was carried out within the terms of Soviet Civil Code. Some Soviet legal scholars even asserted that "criminal repression" may be applied in the absence of guilt.". Martin Latsis, chief of the Ukrainian Cheka explained: "Do not look in the file of incriminating evidence to see whether or not the accused rose up against the Soviets with arms or words. Ask him instead to which class he belongs, what is his background, his education, his profession. These are the questions that will determine the fate of the accused. That is the meaning and essence of the Red Terror."

The purpose of public trials was "not to demonstrate the existence or absence of a crime – that was predetermined by the appropriate party authorities – but to provide yet another forum for political agitation and propaganda for the instruction of the citizenry (see Moscow Trials for example). Defense lawyers, who had to be party members, were required to take their client's guilt for granted..."

== Other theories of human rights ==
Contemporary philosophers distinguish between moral and political conceptions of human rights. Moral conceptions generally regard human rights as grounded in moral considerations that do not depend on legal recognition. Political conceptions instead emphasise the role of human rights within national and international political practices, including their use as standards for evaluating how governments treat individuals. The approaches differ over whether these political functions are essential to the concept of human rights. The philosopher John Finnis argues that human rights are justifiable on the grounds of their instrumental value in creating the necessary conditions for human well-being. According to the interest theory of rights, the justification for human rights lies in their role in protecting essential human interests. These include the conditions necessary for individuals to lead minimally good lives, such as personal security and the satisfaction of basic needs. On this approach, human rights are justified by the interests of the people who hold them, rather than by the advantages that respecting those rights might provide to governments.

The biological theory considers the comparative reproductive advantage of human social behavior based on empathy and altruism in the context of natural selection.

Human security is an emerging school of thought which challenges the traditional, state-based conception of security and argues that a people-focused approach to security is more appropriate in the modern interdependent world and would be more effective in advancing the security of individuals and societies across the globe.

== Human wellbeing and basic needs ==
Some philosophical approaches ground human rights in the conditions necessary for human wellbeing and the pursuit of a minimally decent life. S. Matthew Liao's fundamental conditions approach holds that human beings have rights to certain goods, capacities and options required to pursue a good life. These conditions include basic material necessities and opportunities to develop and exercise fundamental human capacities. The approach distinguishes securing the conditions for pursuing a good life from guaranteeing that individuals will actually achieve one.

Henry Shue's account of basic rights similarly emphasises the conditions required for the enjoyment of other rights. Shue argues that physical security and subsistence are basic rights, encompassing protection against violence and access to necessities such as adequate food, clean water and shelter. On his account, these protections are essential to the effective enjoyment of other rights.

== Protective function of human rights ==
Beyond identifying the interests that human rights protect, philosophers have examined how those interests can be secured against threats. In Basic Rights, Henry Shue characterises a moral right as providing grounds for a justified demand that its enjoyment be socially guaranteed against standard threats. On this account, the possession of a right involves more than the temporary enjoyment of its benefits; it requires social arrangements that protect against their deprivation.

The importance of protection against harmful uses of power is also emphasised in Judith Shklar's political philosophy. Her liberalism of fear gives priority to preventing cruelty and intimidation, particularly where individuals are vulnerable to those who exercise political power over them. Shklar's approach places the prevention of serious abuses, rather than the pursuit of an ideal conception of the good society, at the centre of liberal political thought.

== Human rights and corresponding duties ==
The protection of human rights raises questions about the obligations of individuals, institutions and governments. In Basic Rights, Henry Shue distinguishes three types of duties associated with basic rights: duties to avoid depriving others of their rights, duties to protect people against deprivation by others, and duties to assist those who have been deprived.

Shue challenges the conventional distinction between negative rights, which are often associated with duties of non-interference, and positive rights, which are associated with duties to provide assistance. He argues that both physical security and subsistence rights may require positive action as well as restraint. Securing these rights therefore involves not only refraining from harmful conduct but also protecting people against violations by others.

Some legal scholars have also examined the responsibilities of public authorities through the concept of fiduciary duties. Paul Finn argued that the relationship between the state and the community could be understood in fiduciary terms, but later cautioned against broadly applying private-law fiduciary principles to government decision-making. Former Australian Chief Justice Robert French similarly distinguished the use of fiduciary principles as an ethical framework for public office from their recognition as a general, legally enforceable constitutional principle.

== Universality and cultural relativism ==
The claim that human rights apply universally raises questions about the relationship between universal moral standards and cultural diversity. Critics influenced by moral relativism question whether principles developed within particular historical and cultural traditions can be justified as binding on all societies.

Defenders of universal human rights argue that differences in cultural practices and moral beliefs do not necessarily undermine the possibility of universally justified rights. Some approaches seek to accommodate cultural diversity by distinguishing fundamental human rights from the different social and institutional arrangements through which those rights may be realised. The debate therefore concerns both the justification of universal standards and the extent to which their implementation can vary across societies.

== Critiques of human rights ==
The idea of human rights is not without its critics. Jeremy Bentham, Edmund Burke, Friedrich Nietzsche and Karl Marx are examples of historical philosophers who criticised the notion of natural rights. Alasdair MacIntyre is a leading contemporary critic of human rights. His criticisms are discussed below.

=== Edmund Burke on natural rights ===
Edmund Burke was an 18th-century philosopher, political theorist and statesman largely associated with the school of conservatism. His views on natural rights are best articulated in Reflections on the Revolution in France, which directly attacked the Declaration of the Rights of Man and of the Citizen (1789) and its authors.

A great deal of Burke's uneasiness of the Declaration lies in the drafter's abandonment of the existing establishment. For Burke, constitutional legitimacy was derived not from the Rousseauian doctrine of general will, but from a form of inherited wisdom. He thought that it was arrogant and limiting for the drafters of the Declaration to cast aside traditional notions that had stood the test of time. Although it may seem to the drafters that they had abandoned the shackles of tradition, for Burke, they had limited their findings to the narrow minded conception of one person or group. This is the grounding from which Burke's attack of the Declaration is based.

Burke did not deny the existence of natural rights; rather he thought that the a priori reasoning adopted by the drafters produced notions that were too abstract to have application within the framework of society. In stating that “the pretended right of these theorists are all extremes; and in a proportion as they are metaphysically true, they are morally and politically false”, Burke identified that abstract rights are meaningless without a societal framework:

What is the use of discussing a man’s abstract right to food or medicine? The question is upon the method of procuring and administering them.

— Edmund Burke

In contrast to Locke, Burke did not believe the purpose of government was to protect pre-existing natural rights; he believed “the primitive rights of man undergo such a variety of refractions and reflections, that it becomes absurd to talk of them as if they continued in the simplicity of their original direction.” For Burke it was the government, as a result of long social evolution, that transformed the meaningless natural rights into the practical advantages afforded to citizens.

It was not the rights themselves, as much as the level of abstraction and the placing of them above government which Burke found dangerous. He stated “those who pull down important ancient establishments, who wantonly destroy modes of administration, and public institutions… are the most mischievous, and therefore the wickedest of men”. For Burke politics had no simple answers, and definitely no overarching, universal maxims such as those expressed in the Declaration. Rather the rights afforded to individuals were to be assessed in the context of the social framework. However, he acknowledged that the simplicity of the Declaration was attractive and feared its ability to undermine social order. Burke believed that the absolute nature of these principles of abstraction were inherently revolutionary; they were uncompromising and any derogation from the principles a reason to rise up in arms. This was a problem because;

All government… is founded on compromise and barter. We balance inconveniences; we give and take; we remit some rights, that we may enjoy others; and we choose rather to be happy citizens, than subtle disputants.

— Edmund Burke

The natural rights “Against which there can be no prescription; against these no agreements is binding” gave the revolutionaries the tools to destroy the very society that Burke believed afforded them with rights. In this way Burke thought the rights contained in the Declaration would lead to “the antagonist world of madness, discord, vice, confusion, and unavailing sorrow.”

=== Jeremy Bentham on natural rights ===
The 18th-century Utilitarian philosopher Jeremy Bentham criticised the Declaration of the Rights of Man and of the Citizen in his text Anarchical Fallacies. He famously asserted that the concept of natural rights was “nonsense upon stilts”. Bentham criticised the Declaration both for the language that it adopted and the theories it posited, stating; “Look to the letter, you find nonsense; look beyond the letter, you find nothing.”

One of the critiques Bentham levelled against the Declaration was its assertions of rights in the form of absolute and universal norms. He identified that absolute rights possessed by everyone equally are meaningless and undesirable. They lack meaning because if everyone has, for example, unbounded liberty, there is nothing precluding them from using that liberty to impinge on the liberty of another. In this way “human government and human laws” are required to give some bounds to rights in order for them to be realised. Even if advocates of absolute rights recognise this necessity, as the proponents of the Declaration did, Bentham argues that it is in vain. “It would be self-contradictory, because these rights are, in the same breath which their existence is declared, declared to be imprescriptible; and imprescriptible… means nothing unless it excludes the interference of the laws.”

In addition to this contradiction, Bentham warned of the dangers of couching rights in absolute terms. A government that is able to protect every person's right absolutely and equally is a utopian aspiration, but the Declaration couches it as the conditions for its legitimacy. “Against every government which fails in any degree of fulfilling these expectations, then, it is the professed object of this manifesto to excite insurrection.” Bentham does not deny that there are some laws that are morally wrong; his uneasiness is in easily justifying a revolutionary call to arms – with the violence, chaos and destruction associated with it – based on a repugnant law.

Of the theoretical faults, Bentham thought that natural rights were a construction adopted to pursue the selfish aims of the drafters, of which no logical basis could be found. He acknowledged that it may be desirable to have rights, but “a reason for wishing that a certain right were established, is not that right; want is not supply; hunger is not bread.” To establish rights existed by virtue of laws enacted by a sovereign was logically sound, but to assert rights established by nature was not. “A natural right is a son that never had a father.”

Not only did Bentham think that there was no logical basis for the theory of natural rights, but he believed that their individualistic approach was harmful to society.

The great enemies of public peace are the selfish and the dissocial passions – necessary as they are – the one to the very existence of each individual, the other to his security…What has been the object, the perpetual and palpable object, of this declaration to pretended rights? To add such force as possible to these passions, but already too strong, - to burst the cords that hold them in, - to say to the selfish passions, there – everywhere – is your prey! - to the angry passions, there –everywhere- is your enemy. Such is the morality of this celebrated manifesto.

— Jeremy Bentham

Bentham thought that society was dependent upon people's ability to pursue the greater good, not just the short-term satisfaction of their own desires. The advancement of natural rights, which he saw as celebrating selfishness, was to provide the means to break down the social community that makes human life bearable.

=== Marxist critique of human rights ===
In "On the Jewish Question", Karl Marx criticized the Declaration of the Rights of Man and of the Citizen as bourgeois ideology:

Above all, we note the fact that the so-called rights of man, the droits de l'homme as distinct from the droits du citoyen, are nothing but the rights of a member of civil society – i.e., the rights of egoistic man, of man separated from other men and from the community. ... according to the Declaration of the Rights of Man of 1791:

"Liberty consists in being able to do everything which does not harm others."

Liberty, therefore, is the right to do everything that harms no one else. The limits within which anyone can act without harming someone else are defined by law, just as the boundary between two fields is determined by a boundary post.

Thus, according to Marx: "Security is the supreme social concept of bourgeois society, the concept of the police, the whole society exists only to ensure each of its members the preservation of his person, his rights and his property." For Marx, liberal rights and ideas of justice are premised on the idea that each of us needs protection from other human beings. Therefore, liberal rights are rights of separation, designed to protect us from such perceived threats. Freedom on such a view, is freedom from interference. What this view denies is the possibility — according to Marx, the fact — that real freedom is to be found positively in our relations with other people. It is to be found in human community, not in isolation. So insisting on a regime of rights encourages us to view each other in ways which undermine the possibility of the real freedom we may find in human emancipation.

Marxist critical theorist Slavoj Žižek argued that "liberal attitudes towards the other are characterized both by respect for otherness, openness to it, and an obsessive fear of harassment. In short, the other is welcomed insofar as its presence is not intrusive, insofar as it is not really the other. Tolerance thus coincides with its opposite. My duty to be tolerant towards the other effectively means that I should not get too close to him or her, not intrude into his space—in short, that I should respect his intolerance towards my over-proximity. This is increasingly emerging as the central human right of advanced capitalist society: the right not to be 'harassed', that is, to be kept at a safe distance from others." and "universal human rights are effectively the right of white, male property-owners to exchange freely on the market, exploit workers and women, and exert political domination."

=== Alasdair MacIntyre on human rights ===
Alasdair MacIntyre is a Scottish philosopher who has published a number of works in a variety of philosophical fields, including political philosophy, ethics and metaphysics. MacIntyre criticises the concept of human rights in After Virtue and he famously asserts that “there are no such rights, and belief in them is one with belief in witches and in unicorns.”

MacIntyre argues that every attempt at justifying the existence of human rights has failed. The assertions by 18th century philosophers that natural rights are self-evident truths, he argues, are necessarily false as there are no such things as self-evident truths. He says that the plea 20th century philosophers made to intuition show a flaw in philosophical reasoning. MacIntyre then outlines that, although Ronald Dworkin is not wrong in asserting that the inability to demonstrate a statement does not necessitate its falsity, the same argument can be applied in relation to witches and unicorns.

MacIntyre made this critique of human rights in the context of a wider argument about the failure of the Enlightenment to produce a coherent moral system. Philosophers of the Enlightenment sought to cast aside the discredited notions of hierarchy and teleology as justifications for morality. Instead, MacIntyre argues, the Enlightenment placed the individual as the sovereign authority to dictate what is right and wrong. However allegiances to historical notions of morality remained and philosophers sought to find a secular and rational justification for existing beliefs. The problem, MacIntyre maintains, is that teleological morality was developed to overcome defects in human nature; to posit an example of the ideal. Without this notion of ‘perfect humanity’ the only remaining foundation to build a moral theory on was the foundation of imperfect human nature. For MacIntyre, the result was a collection of moral stances, each claiming to have a rational justification and each disputing the findings of the rival notions.

MacIntyre believes that a number of contemporary moral debates that occur in modern society can be explained as a result of this failure of the “Enlightenment Project”. Human rights are an example of a moral belief, founded in previous teleological beliefs, which make the false claim of being grounded in rationality. To illustrate how the principles lead to conflict, he gives the example of abortion; in this case the right of the mother to exercise control over her body is contrasted with the deprivation of a pre-born child to the right to life. Although both the right to liberty and the right to life are, on their own, considered morally acceptable claims, conflict arises when we posit them against each other.

== Theory of value and property ==
Henry of Ghent articulated the theory that every person has a property interest in their own body. John Locke uses the word property in both broad and narrow senses. In a broad sense, it covers a wide range of human interests and aspirations; more narrowly, it refers to material goods. He argues that property is a natural right and it is derived from labour. In addition, property precedes government and government cannot "dispose of the estates of the subjects arbitrarily." To deny valid property rights according to Locke is to deny human rights. The British philosopher had significant impacts upon the development of the Government of the UK and was central to the fundamental founding philosophy of the United States. Karl Marx later critiqued Locke's theory of property in his Theories of Surplus Value, seeing the beginnings of a theory of surplus value in Locke's works. In Locke's Second Treatise he argued that the right to own private property was unlimited as long as nobody took more than they could use without allowing any of their property to go to waste and that there were enough common resources of comparable quality available for others to create their own property. Locke did believe that some would be more "industrious and rational" than others and would amass more property, but believed this would not cause shortages. Though this system could work before the introduction of money, Marx argued in Theories of Surplus Value that Locke's system would break down and claimed money was a contradiction of the law of nature on which private property was founded.
