= Institutum Europaeum =

Belgium think tank

Institutum Europeaum was a libertarian think tank based in Sint-Genesius-Rode, a suburb of Brussels, Belgium. The Institutum was founded and led by Michiel (Michael) Van Notten, a Dutch lawyer and intellectual, in the late 1970s until his death in 2002. Institutum Europaeum was in the vanguard of the efforts to prevent the centralization and growth of power in the European Community/European Union, and was particularly active in arguing against European Monetary Union.

One of its most influential efforts was publishing Professor Pascal Salin's, L'unité monétaire européenne : au profit de qui? (The European Currency Unit: for whose benefit?), which contained a foreword by Nobel Prize winning Economist and libertarian thinker Friedrich Hayek. This work provided the impetus for a Conference held in Brussels organized by the Institutum on European Monetary Union and Currency Competition at which papers were presented by Salin, Hayek and fellow Nobel Prize laureate in economics Milton Friedman, along with Leonard Liggio, Pedro Schwartz, Lawrence White and others in the field of libertarian thought and economics. These papers were published together in a volume published by the Institutum Europaeum, Currency Competition and Monetary Union. Although these arguments were unsuccessful in halting European monetary union and the eventual adoption of the Euro, the warnings of the instability which European monetary union would create, would ultimately gain widespread credence decades later after the predictions contained in the book became reality. More importantly, these efforts of the Institutum Europeaum were influential in the Eurosceptic movement, which prevented the United Kingdom from joining the Euro Zone, and led to the growth of the Eurosceptic movement.

The Institutum Europaeum was also active in the anti-Federalist Bruges Group, and regularly sent representatives to its Congresses.

In addition to its work relating to the European Community/European Union, the Institutum Europeaum was also involved in promoting libertarian thought in Europe, particularly to those working for the EC/EU and its institutions. Van Notten also represented the Institutum by regularly lecturing on the virtues of liberty and limited government.
