= Sexual rites of passage =

Ceremony that marks the passage to sexual maturity; involves sexual activity

A sexual rite of passage is a ceremonial event that marks the passage of a young person to sexual maturity and adulthood, or a widow from the married state to widowhood, and involves some form of sexual activity.

It is thought that the motivation to force daughters into requiring sexual experience with men is to make them more appealing as marriage prospects in poverty stricken areas where raising daughters, who have less economic prospects, is seen as a burden.

== Sexual cleansing after menarche ==
A ceremony of ritual purification known in some places as kusasa fumbi (lit. 'brushing off the dust') is performed where girls have sexual intercourse following menarche. This is seen in some regions of Malawi (mainly Chikwawa, Nsanje, and Salima Districts). Such sexual cleansing is also practiced in parts of Namibia, Angola, Congo, Ivory Coast, Mozambique, Tanzania, Uganda, and Zambia.

Prepubescent girls (as young as seven years old to 17) are sent to a training camp where women known as anamkungwi, or 'key leaders', teach them domestic work and sexual intercourse in order to become good wives. At the training camp, the girls are told that they should sleep with to get rid of 'childhood dust' and avoid disease. After the training, a man holding the traditional position of hyena (not to be confused with the animal) performs the three-day cleansing ritual for money ($4-7 per girl in 2016). Sometimes, girls are required to perform a bare-breasted dance called chisamba, meant to satisfy their future husbands in bed, "in an explicit manner as they are being presented to the whole community".

The practice can place young girls at risk of HIV infection, since the hyena has sexual intercourse with all girls without wearing condoms, as the ritual requires the exchange of sexual fluids. Traditionalist Malawians claim that the rite prevents disease; hyenas are usually selected for their reputed good moral character and are often erroneously believed to be incapable of being infected with diseases such as HIV/AIDS, though HIV-positive men have been documented to perform the duties of a hyena.

This ceremony may also be performed after an abortion.

== Sex training tests ==
Chinamwali is a three-month ritual performed in Eastern Province, Zambia. Female initiators known as alangizi teach sexual practices to girls as young as twelve years old. Afterwards, they are sent to an older man from the community who 'tests' their sexual skills and decide whether they need to go back for more training. The practice is likely underreported, as those who undergo it are sworn to secrecy.

== Boy insemination initiation rites ==
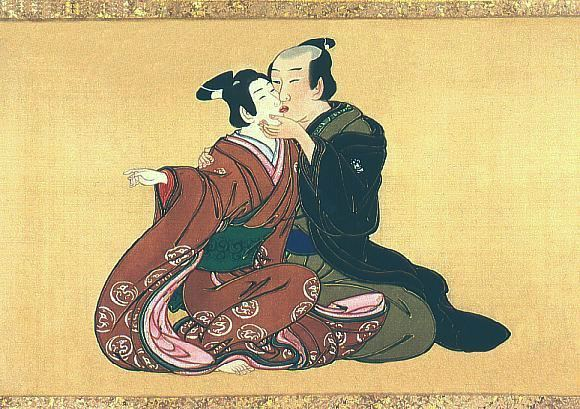
Japanese panel from 1750 (Edo period) depicting a samurai having sexual relations with an adolescent boy.

Many cultures have practiced sexual initiation rites of pre-pubescent boys as young as seven years old, usually through sexual acts with older males. For example, in the New Guinea Highlands, among the Baruya and Etoro, fellatio and the ingestion of semen was performed. The Kaluli practiced anal sex to 'deliver' semen to the boy. The Etoro reviled these Kaluli practices, finding them disgusting. The practices continued at least up till the early 80s. The Sambia used to, but have abandoned the practice. These rites are often based on the belief that women represent cosmic disorder. Similar rites of ‘boy insemination’ used to be practiced by societies of indigenous Australians, in ancient Greece, and in Japan during the Edo (Tokugawa) period.

== Sexual cleansing of widows ==
The sexual cleansing of widows is a tradition that requires widowed women to have sexual intercourse as a form of ritual purification. It is practiced in parts of Angola, Congo, Ivory Coast, Malawi (where it is known as kulowa kufa), Mozambique, Kenya, Uganda, and Tanzania. It has been suggested that the practice might be based on the idea that a man might die as a result of witchcraft performed by his wife.

The three- to seven-day ritual can be performed by the deceased husband's brother or other male relative, or even a sex worker. Typically, after intercourse, the widow burns her clothes and the man who had performed the purification shaves her head. This is often done outside so that the neighborhood can witness that the widow is now cleansed.

The ritual is often forced upon a widow by the family of her deceased husband and the wider community, who may physically harm the uncompliant woman and her children. Widow cleansing was outlawed in Kenya by a 2015 bill against domestic violence.
