= Michael van Notten =

Dutch lawyer (1933–2002)

Marinus Michiel (Michael) van Notten (8 December 1933 in Zeist – 2 June 2002 in Nîmes) was a Dutch lawyer who co-founded the Libertarian Center in the Netherlands, the Institutum Europaeum in Belgium, and wrote a book on Somali customary law.

Van Notten graduated from Leiden University in Law and was admitted into practice in Rotterdam. He later served with a New York law firm and directed the Institutum Europaeum, a Brussels-based libertarian policy research organization. In the early 1990s, he became interested in the prospect of Somalia developing in the modern world of a stateless society, and for the next twelve years, he studied Somali customary law. A keen analyst of the intricacies of clan politics, he traveled fearlessly in war-torn Somalia.

Van Notten's book The Law of the Somalis: A Stable Foundation for Economic Development in the Horn of Africa explores the many striking features of Somali customary law: it is compensatory, for example, rather than punitive. Instead of being imprisoned or punished, law-breakers are forced to compensate their victims. A victim seldom fails to receive compensation, because every Somali is insured by near kin against his or her liabilities under the law.

Being based on custom Somali law, there is no need of legislation or legislators, hence this society is free of political influences. Even so, van Notten points out areas in the law that are in need of change. These do not require legislation, however; many desirable changes, such as ending restrictions on the sale of land and enhancing the status of women, are implicit in economic development. As for the Somali political system, not only is there no need to set up a democracy, the author clearly shows why any attempt to do so must inevitably produce chaos. This book by a trained and sympathetic observer shows how, viewed in global perspective, Somali law stands with the Medieval laws and the English common law against the statutory law that originated in continental Europe with the modern nation state. It explains many seeming anomalies about present-day Somalia and describes its prospects as well as the dangers facing it.

The writing of this book was influenced by libertarian legal scholar Frank Van Dun.
