= Frank Van Dun =

Belgian law philosopher (born 1947)

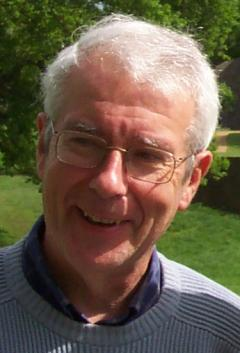
- Born: 22 February 1947 (age 79); Antwerp, Belgium

Philosophical work
- Era: Contemporary philosophy
- Region: Western philosophy
- School: Classical liberalism
- Institutions: University of Ghent; Mises Institute; Rothbard Institute
- Main interests: Philosophy of law Philosophy of human rights
- Website: users.ugent.be/~frvandun

Frank Van Dun (Flemish: [vɑn ˈdʏn]; born February 22, 1947) is a Belgian philosopher of law and classical liberal natural law theorist. He is associated with the law faculty of the University of Ghent. In 2013 he was awarded the Prize for Liberty by the Flemish classical-liberal think tank Libera!.

== Work ==
Van Dun published his book Het Fundamenteel Rechtsbeginsel (Dutch for The Fundamental Principle of Law) in 1983, in which he argued that a rationally convincing answer to the question "What is law?" can only be found by respecting dialogue and argumentation. He is thus an adherent of argumentation ethics. Based on this premise, Van Dun argues that every natural person (individual) has a lawful claim on his life, freedom and property. This claim is absolute, insofar as it does not prohibit the equivalent claims of other natural persons, i.e. insofar as argumentation is respected.

Van Dun clearly distinguishes the rightful (ius) and the legal (lex). In his view, Western positive law systems reduce people to human resources, artificial persons with merely legal status. Positive law defines the legal but can only be rightful insofar as individuals have full secession rights from the institutional framework that is making said positive law. It logically follows that no judge can be forced upon a person who is willing to search a lawful solution for any conflict.

Van Dun claims that the correct interpretation of the non-aggression principle (NAP) is praxeological rather than physical, because property is a "means of action". He thus claims freedom before property instead of freedom as property. This implies that it's not necessarily only the last action in the chain of social causations that is unlawful. Consider the following examples:

- With regard to land encirclement, a praxeological NAP could imply a "freedom proviso" when the encircling land owner refuses to discuss a reasonable solution.
- With regard to copyrights, a praxeological NAP implies that the use of one's signature (as an expression of one's body as "means of action") could reasonably be considered more important than the physical freedom of exactly copying another person's signature with one's paper and ink.
- With regard to freedom of speech, a praxeological NAP could imply that it is unlawful for an individual to order an unlawful act, e.g. a general ordering a murder of someone willing to seek lawful solutions.

The freedom before property interpretation of the NAP is not widely accepted within the libertarian community. For example, Walter Block adheres to the freedom as property interpretation.

=== Human rights ===
Van Dun sees human rights as fundamentally different from the "Universal Declaration of Human Rights". According to him when you have a right you have a right. Therefore, human rights are, e.g., the right of self-determination for one's own life, liberty and the products of one's liberty (property) and he call these rights fundamental rights. This is not the case in the "Universal Declaration of Human Rights". He sees the "Universal Declaration of Human Rights" equivalent to "Animal Rights", since the rights enumerated in the "Universal Declaration of Human Rights" are sometimes conflicting with each other and many of these rights are only valid insofar as legislation of the government is not contradicting it. Therefore, he sees rulers which are acting as masters of the "human" animals (i.e. "slaves") in the "Universal Declaration of Human Rights".

== Tobacco lobby ==
The Belgian newspaper Le Soir reported on 8 June 2012, that between 1988 and 2000, Belgian scientists Van Dun and Marcel Javeau were paid by the tobacco lobby, through the group 'Associates for Research in the Science of Enjoyment' (ARISE). Van Dun responded in the Belgian Eos-magazine that while indeed he gave two presentations for ARISE in which he presented his visions, he wasn't paid to do so and he never was a member of ARISE. However, the Legacy Tobacco Documents Library contains a document that lists Van Dun as an "associate".

== Books ==
- Het fundamenteel rechtsbeginsel (‘The Fundamental Principle of Law’) (1983) (Dutch 2008 PDF version)
- Crash en Depressie (1988) (‘Crash and Depression’) ISBN 90-72435-01-X
- De utopische verleiding (‘The Utopian Enticement’), with Hans Crombag, 1997, ISBN 90-254-2466-X
- Mens, burger, fiscus (‘Man, Citizen, Taxes’, 2000) ISBN 90-423-0125-2
