= Keltenmuseum =

Keltenmuseum, Hallein
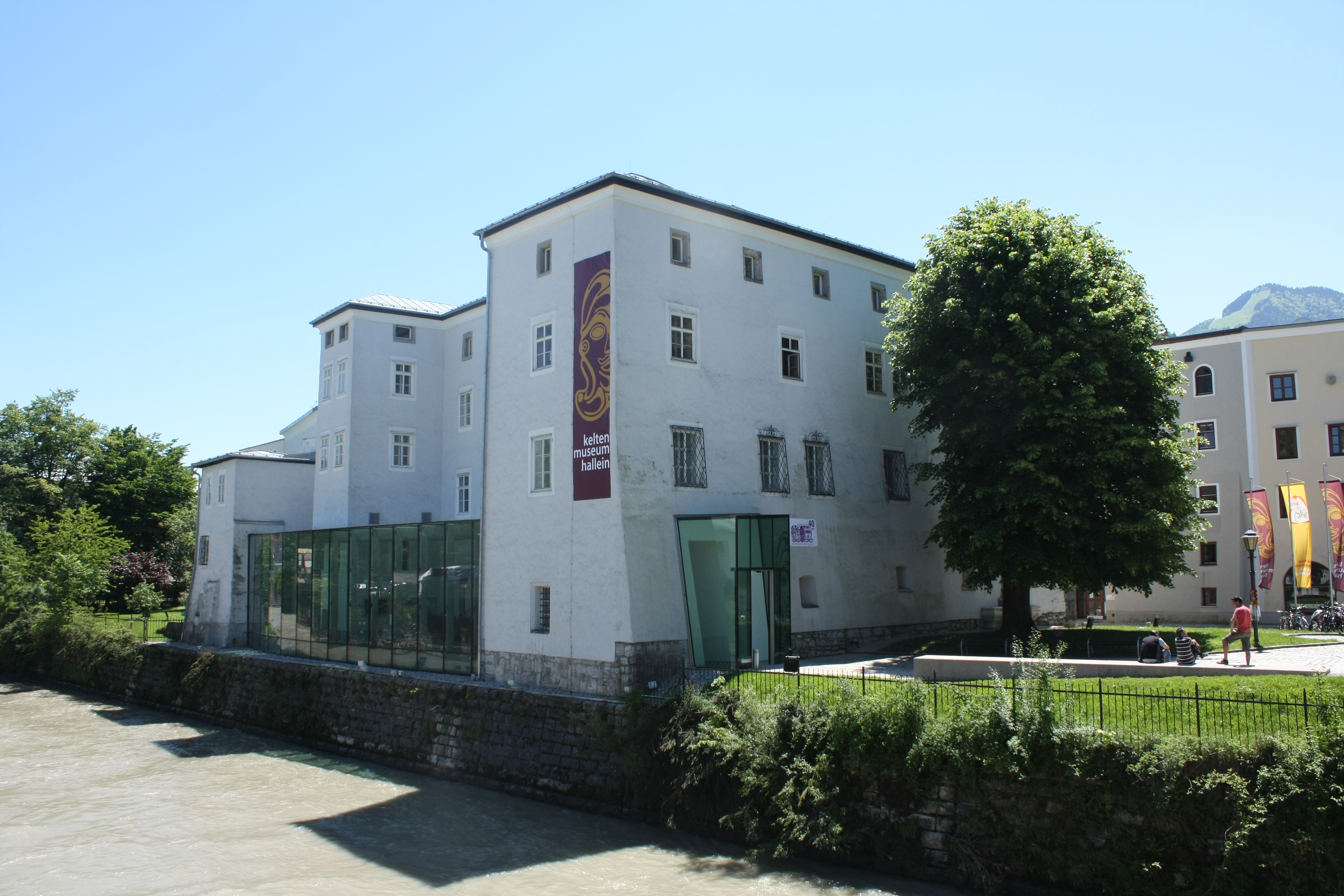
- Keltenmuseum, Hallein from the river Salzach
- Established: 1882
- Location: Pflegerplatz, Hallein
- Coordinates: 47.410°N 13.537°E
- Type: Part of the Salzburg Museum
- Website: www.keltenmuseum.at/de/

The Keltenmuseum in Hallein near Salzburg contains major discoveries from the La Tène period of the Iron Age which come from burials in the area surrounding the nearby Hallein Salt Mine (Salzbergwerk Dürrnberg), at Dürrnberg. The Museum was founded in 1882 and was housed in the Bürgerspital. In 1930 it was moved into the Rathaus and from 1952 occupied a gateway of the town or stadt's fortifications. In 1970 the name was changed to Keltenmuseum and the museum was moved into the former Salt Offices (Saline Hallein) on the Pflegerplatz, which fronts the river Salzach. In 1980 the Museum staged a major exhibition "Die Kelten in Mitteleuropa" (The Celts in Central Europe), which demonstrated the wealth of discoveries that were being made at the Hallein. In 1993-4 the Austrian architect Heinz Tesar drew up plans for the conversion and extension of the Museum and on 1 January 2012 the Museum became a constituent part of Salzburg Museum.

== The Salt Office and the Saline Hallein ==
The building dates from the mid-18th century and in the Salt Office, now the top floor of the Museum, are a series of rooms, including the Prince's Chamber and Green Room, which have a series of 80 paintings by the artist Benedict Werkstötter, which illustrate the various processes of salt production. These were specially commissioned following a visit by the Prince- Bishop Sigismund von Schrattenbach in 1757. The Prince-Archbishops of Salzburg derived much of their wealth from the mining of salt at Hallein, although in 1732-4, 780 of the miners, who were protestants, were forced to leave Hallein because of their religious beliefs. In 1816, following the inclusion of Salzburgerland into the Habsburg Empire the office was amalgamated with the other Austrian salt production centres

=== Paintings in Salt Office ===
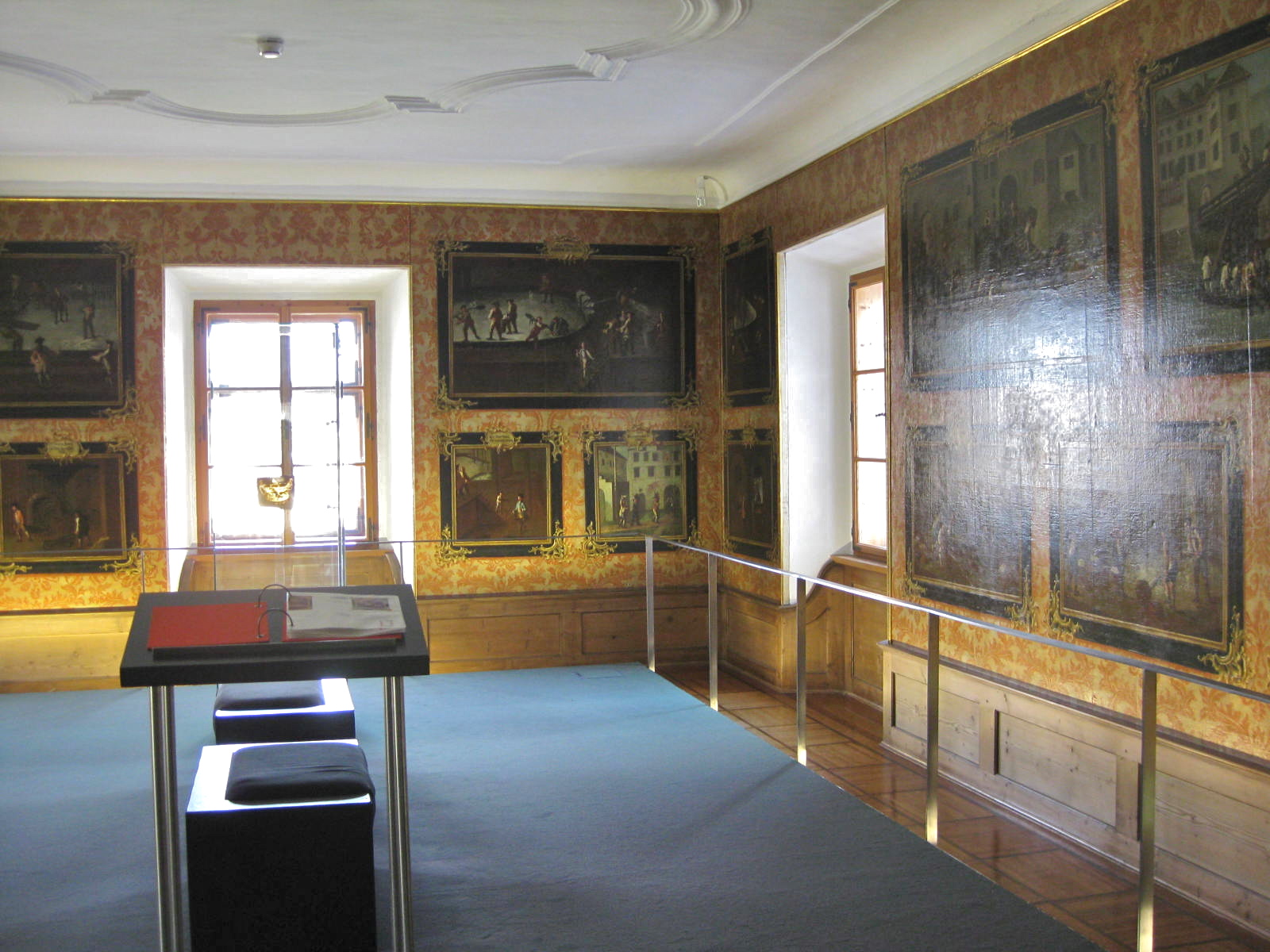
Salt Office Keltenmuseum Hallein

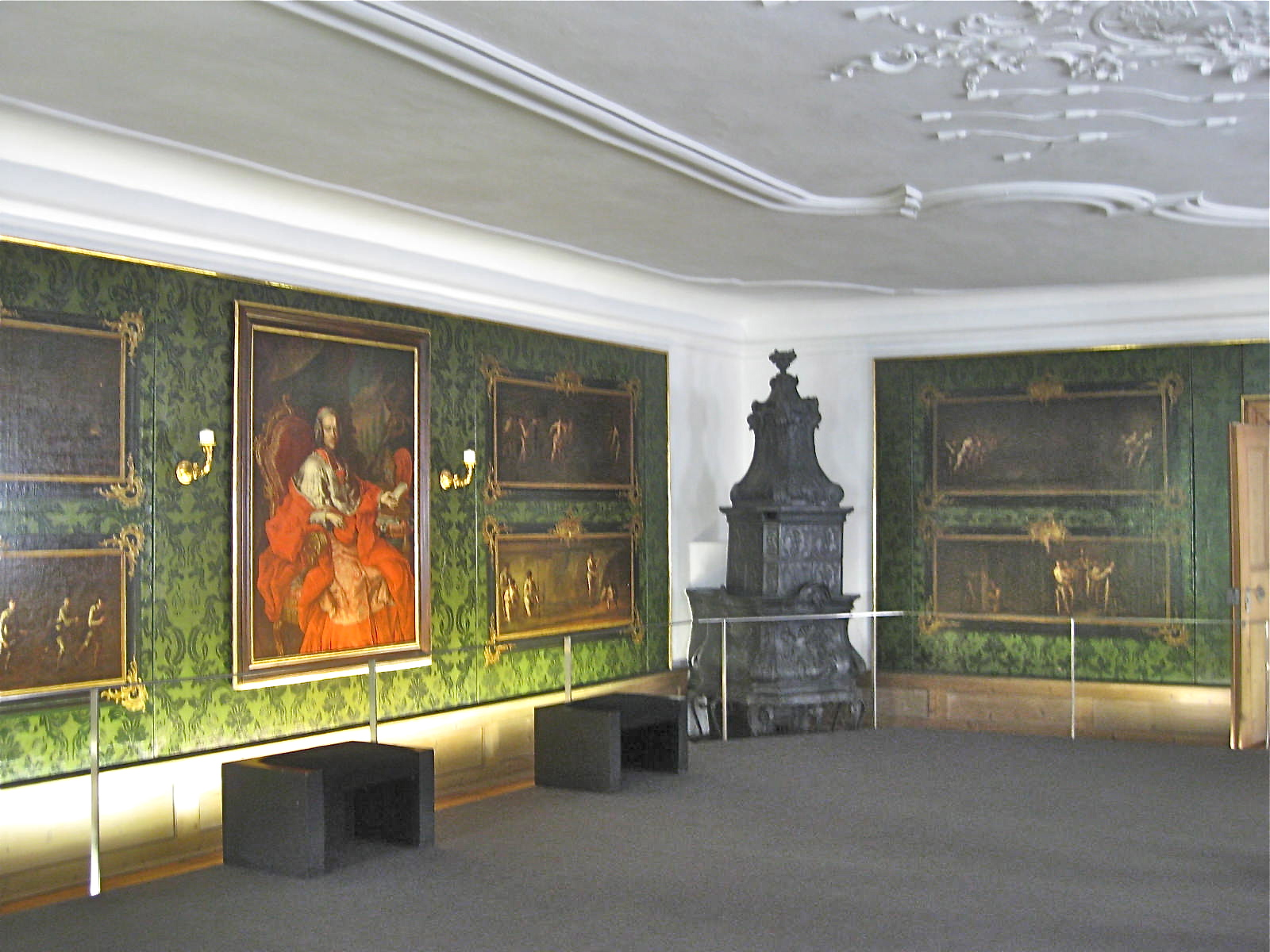
Salt Office Keltenmuseum Hallein

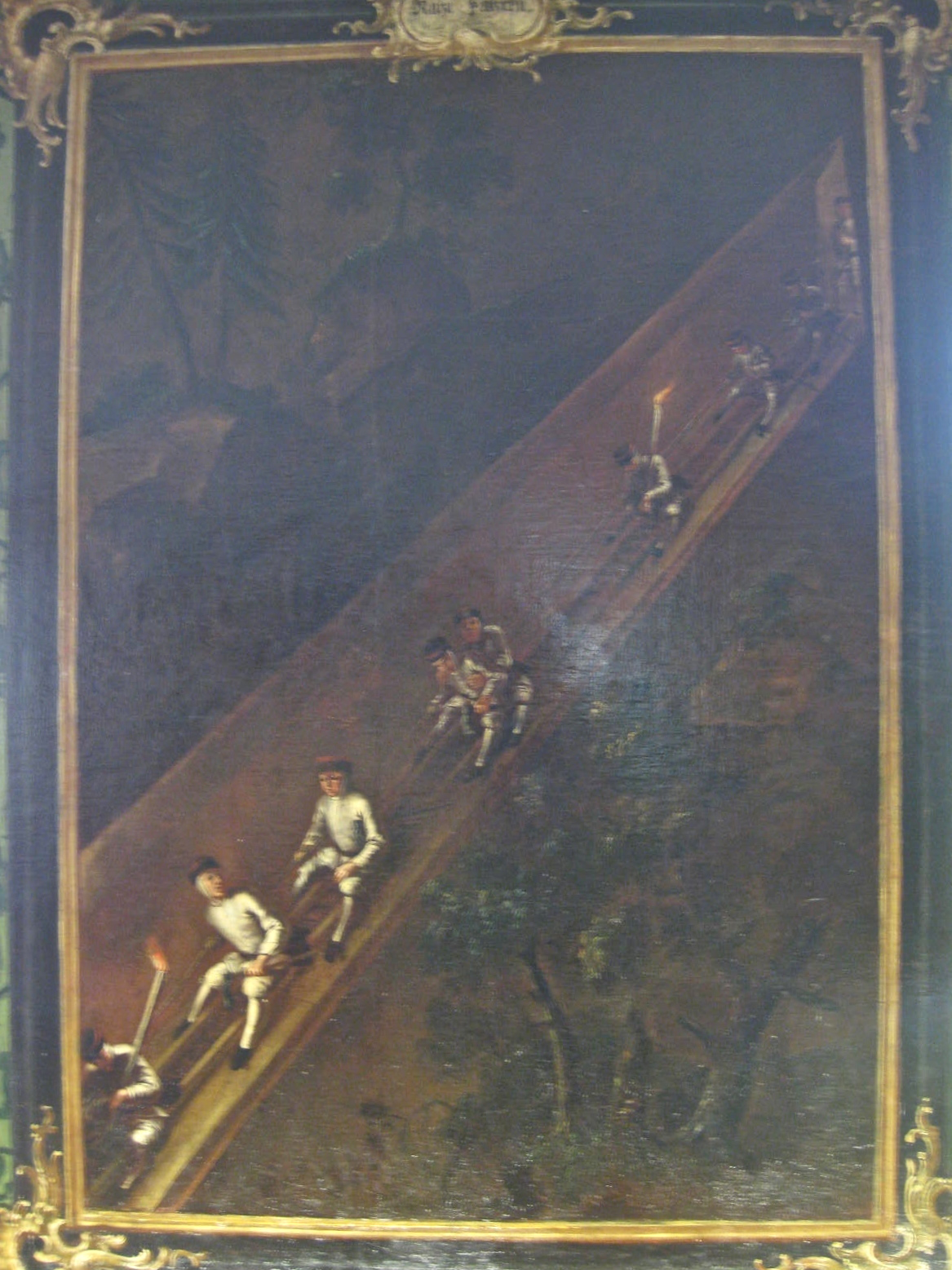
Miners descending wooden shute into mine.

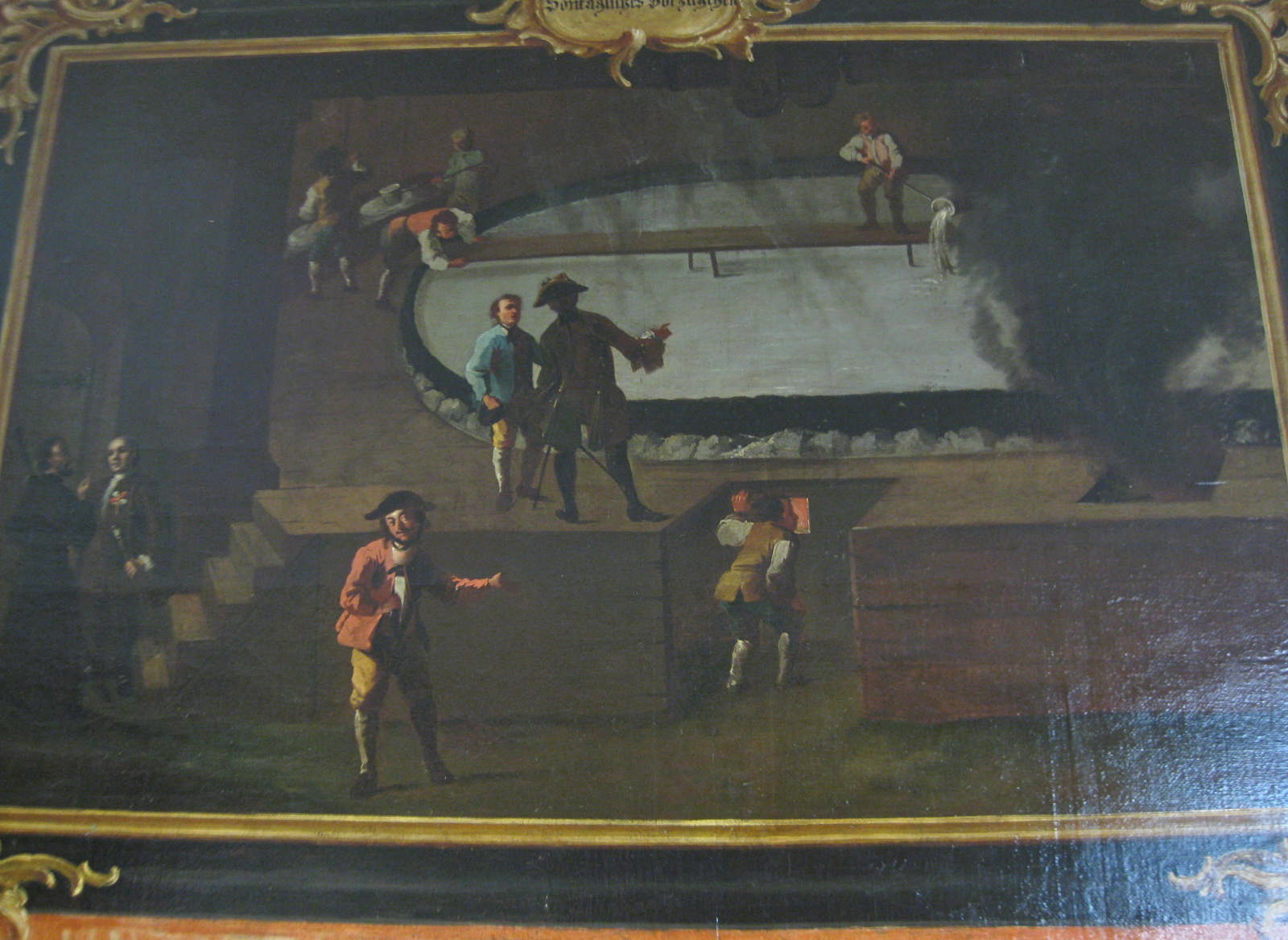
Salt Office Keltenmuseum Hallein

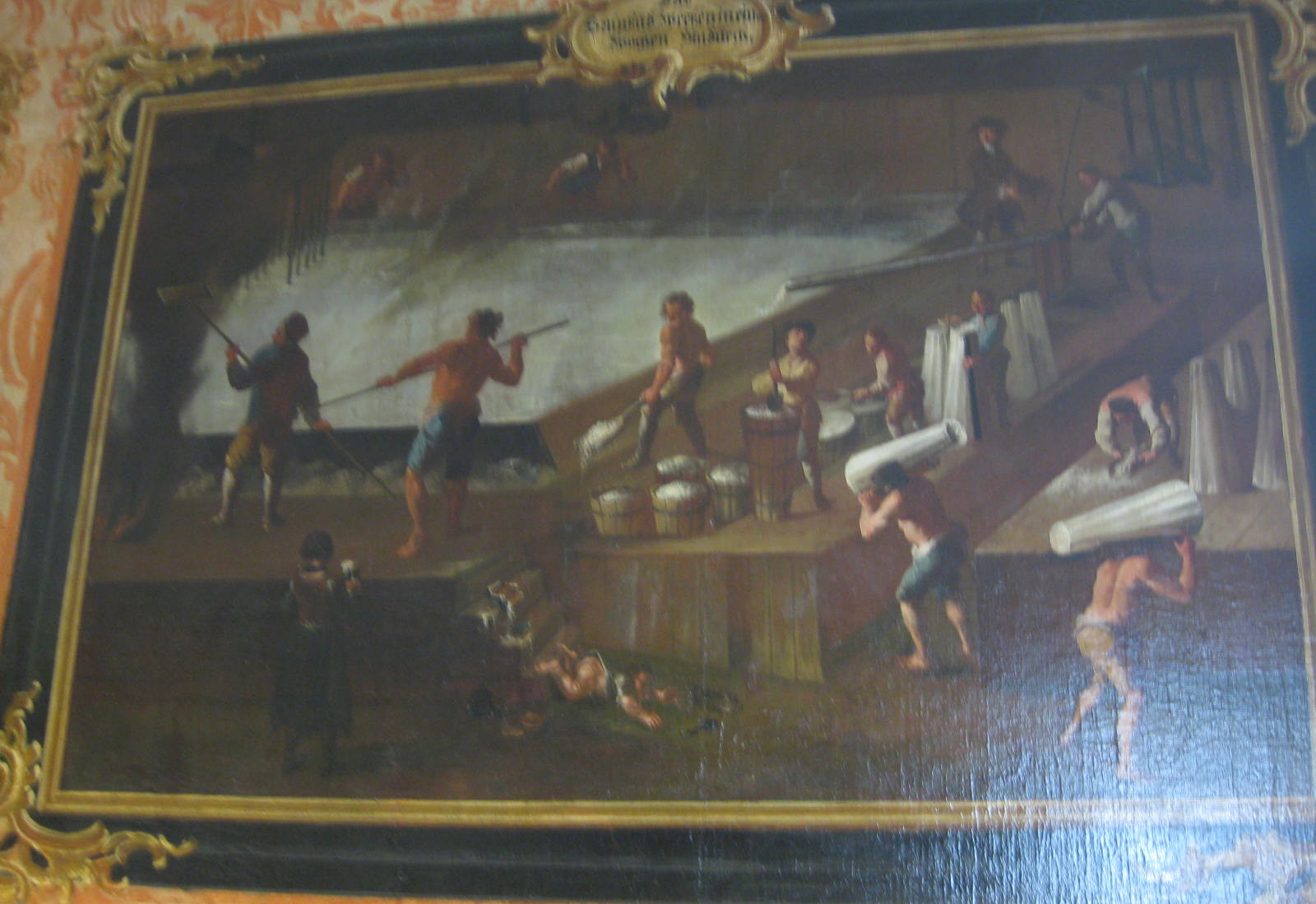
Salt Office Keltenmuseum Hallein

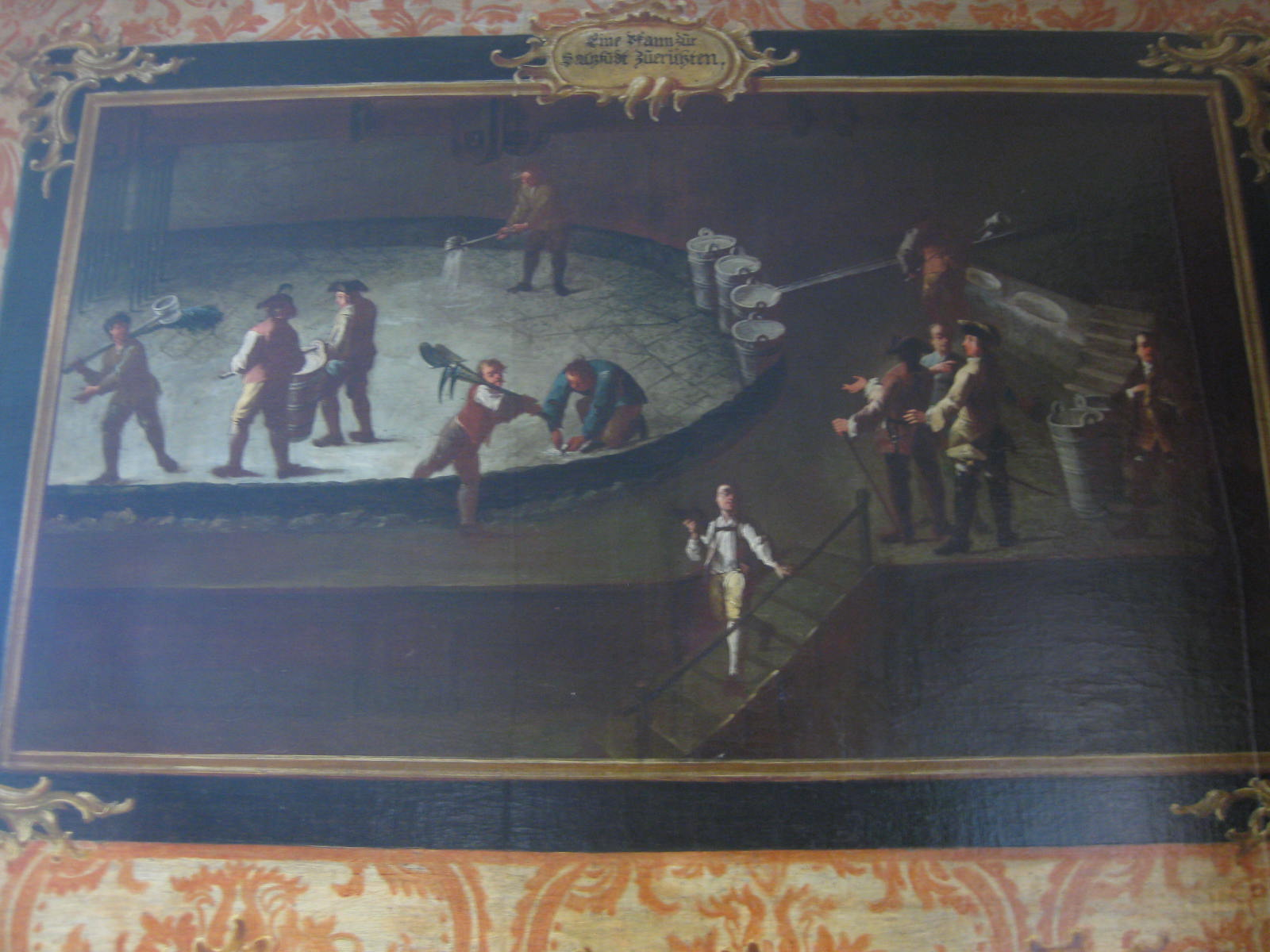
Salt Office Keltenmuseum Hallein

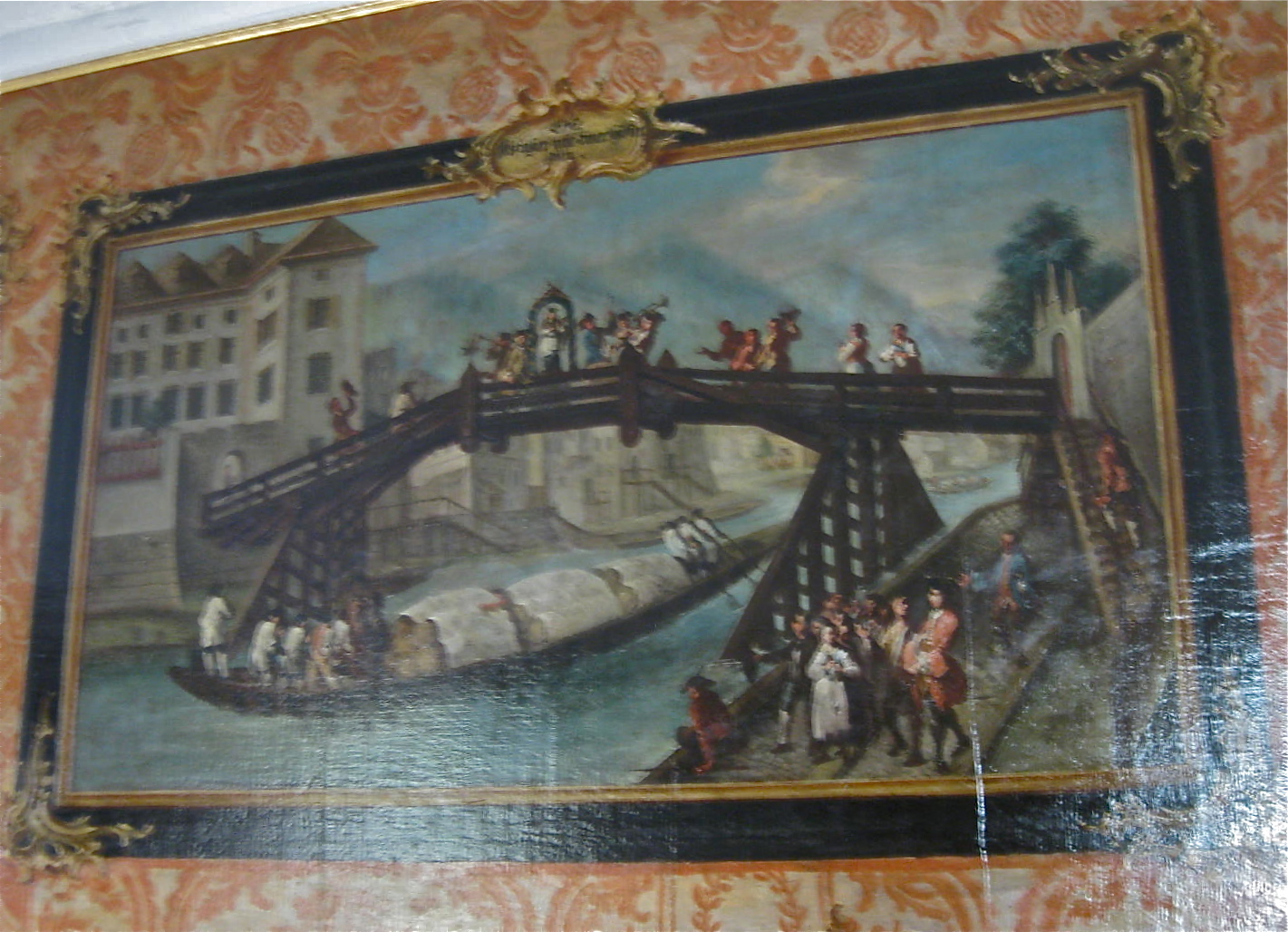
Salt Office Keltenmuseum Hallein

== Salt Mining in the Hallein Area ==
The richest deposits of salt in central Europe are concentrated in at short distance from each other in the Eastern Alps, in the Salzburg and Salzkammergut areas. The mines of Hallstatt, Hallein-Durrnberg and Bad Reichenhall are close together, with those at Bad Aussee further to the east. Mining at Halstatt started in the later Bronze Age and reached its peak during the Hallstatt phase of the Iron Age (c750-480BC). At Hallein-Durrnberg mining started later at the end of the Hallstatt period and the two mines co-existed for about 200 years. Mining at Hallstatt at ceased suddenly around 400BC. It is thought that some sort of natural disaster, possibly the flooding of the mines, stopped the salt-mining at Hallstatt.

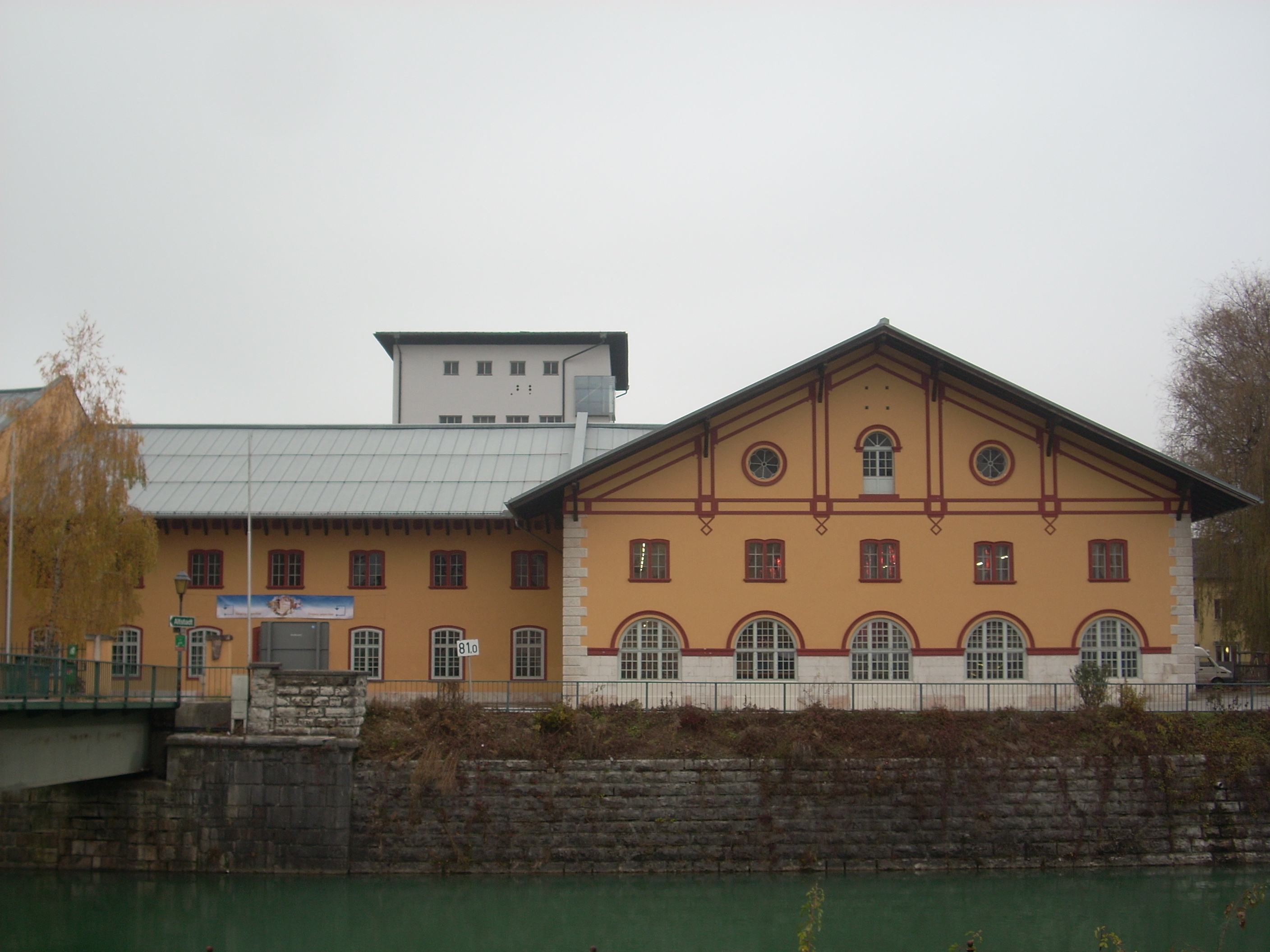
The Saltworks on Perner Island, opposite the Salt Office. Now used as a Salzburg Festival Concert Hall

The evidence of wealth from the Hallein-Durrnberg cemeteries suggest that for most of the La Tène period the mines flourished, but around 100BC the mines went into decline and production seems to have moved to Reichensall.

Salt mining was re-established at Hallein by 1198 AD when a salt pan is mentioned at "Meulpach" . Under the Archbishops of Salzburg during the Middle Ages, Hallein became the major centre of production in the Eastern Alps and salt routes developed up the Salzach and particularly to Bohemia. In the 18th and early 19th centuries Hallein lost its trade with Bavaria and Bohemia. In 1854/62 a new saline conditioning plant was built on Perner Island, which is in the Salzach opposite the Keltenmuseum. Then in 1954/55 a new thermo-compression plant was added. However, with the rationalization of Austrian Salt production in 1989, these plants were closed and salt extraction ceased. The Dürrnberg mine exists now only as a Tourist attraction, together with the Celtic Village Open Air Museum.

== The Burials on display in the Keltenmuseum ==
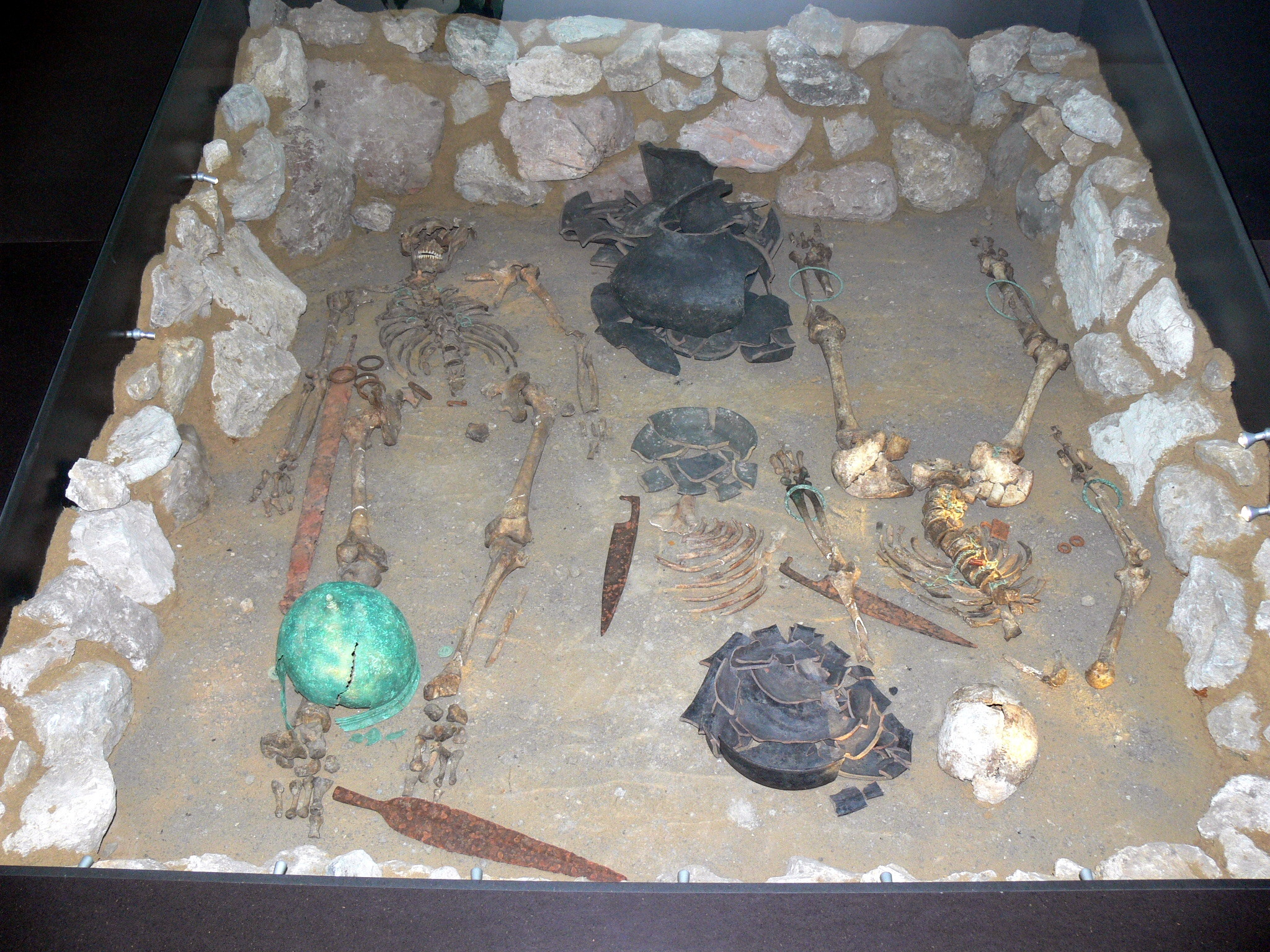
Double Grave 39

Iron Age burials have been found over a large area around the Salt Mine at Dürrnberg since the 16th century. In more recent times an excavation of a robbed burial mound in 1932 produced a spectacular bronze wine flagon. This was previously on display in Salzburg Museum, but is now at the Keltenmuseum. In the 1960s Ernst Penninger started his excavations at the Moserstein, producing a series of very rich burials of the final phase of the Hallstatt period and the early La Tène period. This has been followed by excavations at Lettenbühel, Kranzbichl and Simonsbauerfeld. The most important burials are:

=== Grave 39, Moserstein ===
Double Grave Celtic grave 39 ( 410-370 BC ) at Moserstein with Helmet and shield

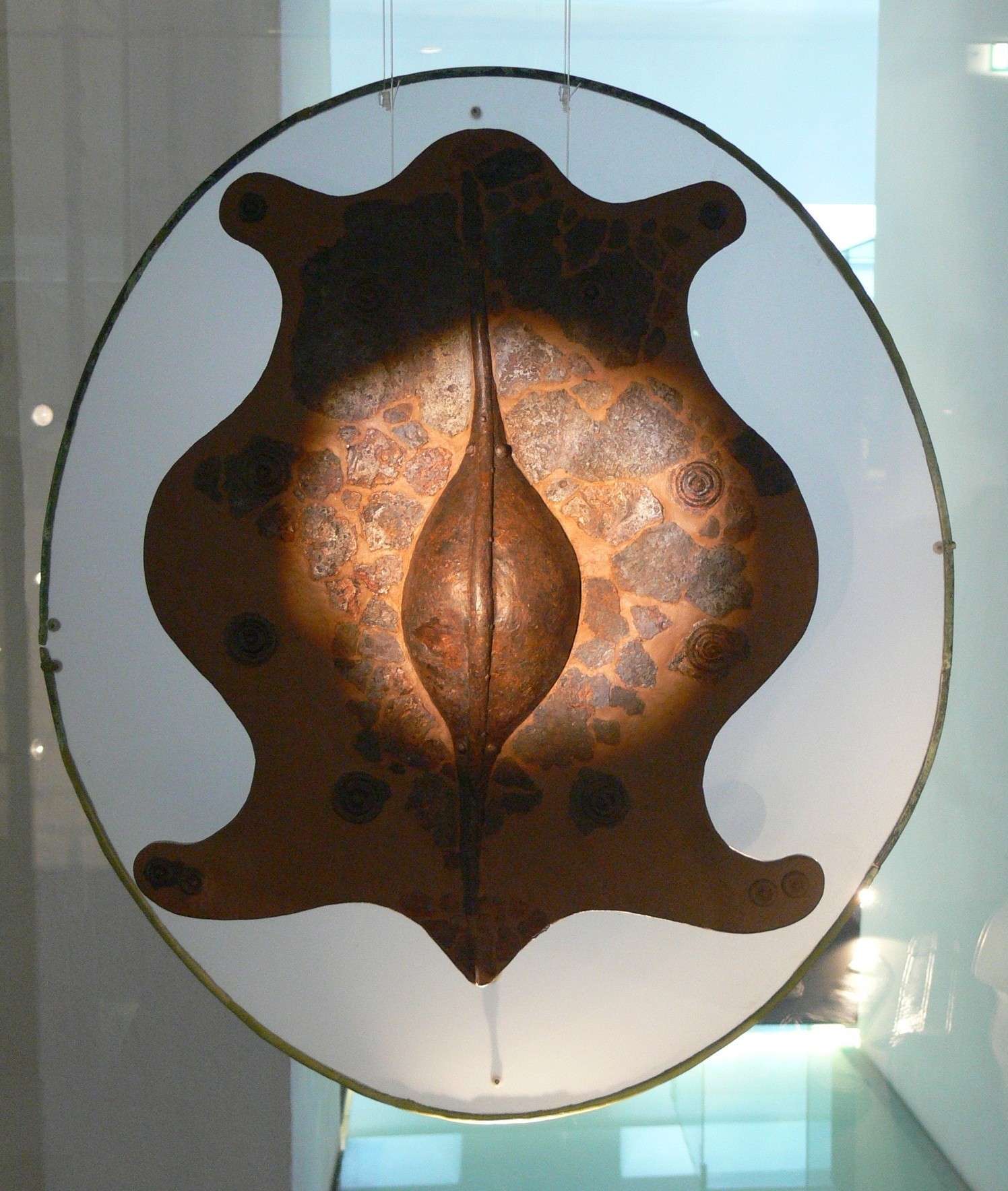
The reconstructed shield boss from Grave 39.

=== Grave 44, Moserstein ===
Fürstengrab "Grave of a prince" 44 at Moserstein. (4th century BC ). Excavated in 1959. Evidence for a two-wheeled chariot. The 'princely' warrior was buried with a wooden jug that had bronze mounts, one of which is the stylised Celtic head which is used as the logo of the Keltenmuseum. There was also a spouted bronze pilgrim flask, which could hold 17 litres of wine and a bucket or [situla] shaped vessel which could hold around 200 litres, inside which was an Athenian pottery kylix which can be dated to around 470BC. At the feet of this warrior was his pointed bronze helmet, of typical La Tène type, an Iron sword, a bow and arrow and three lances. A small gold model of a boat with two oars is symbolic of the journey to the afterlife

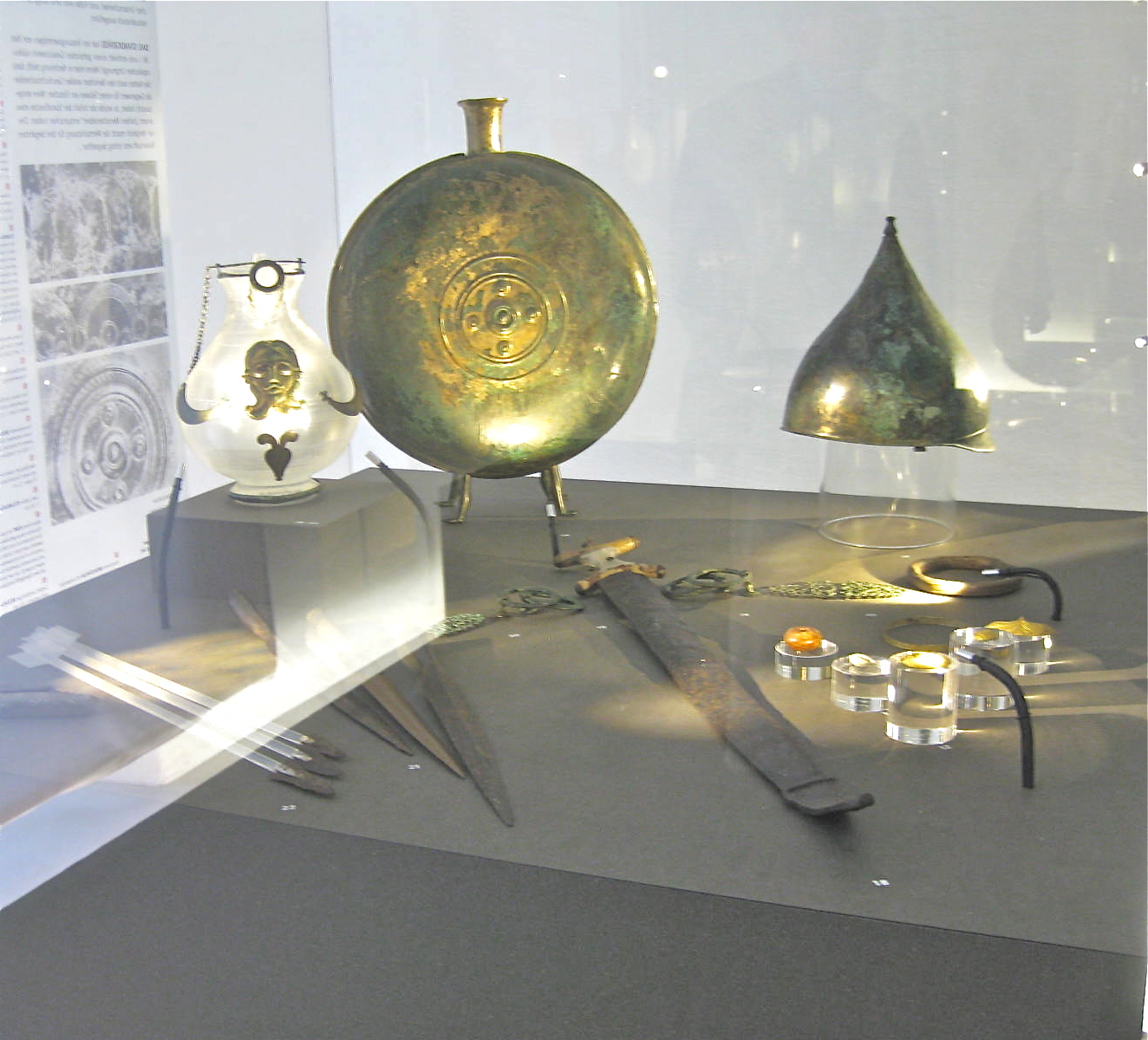
Keltenmuseum, Hallein. Finds from the Salt Mines at Dürrnberg Fürstengrab 44 .

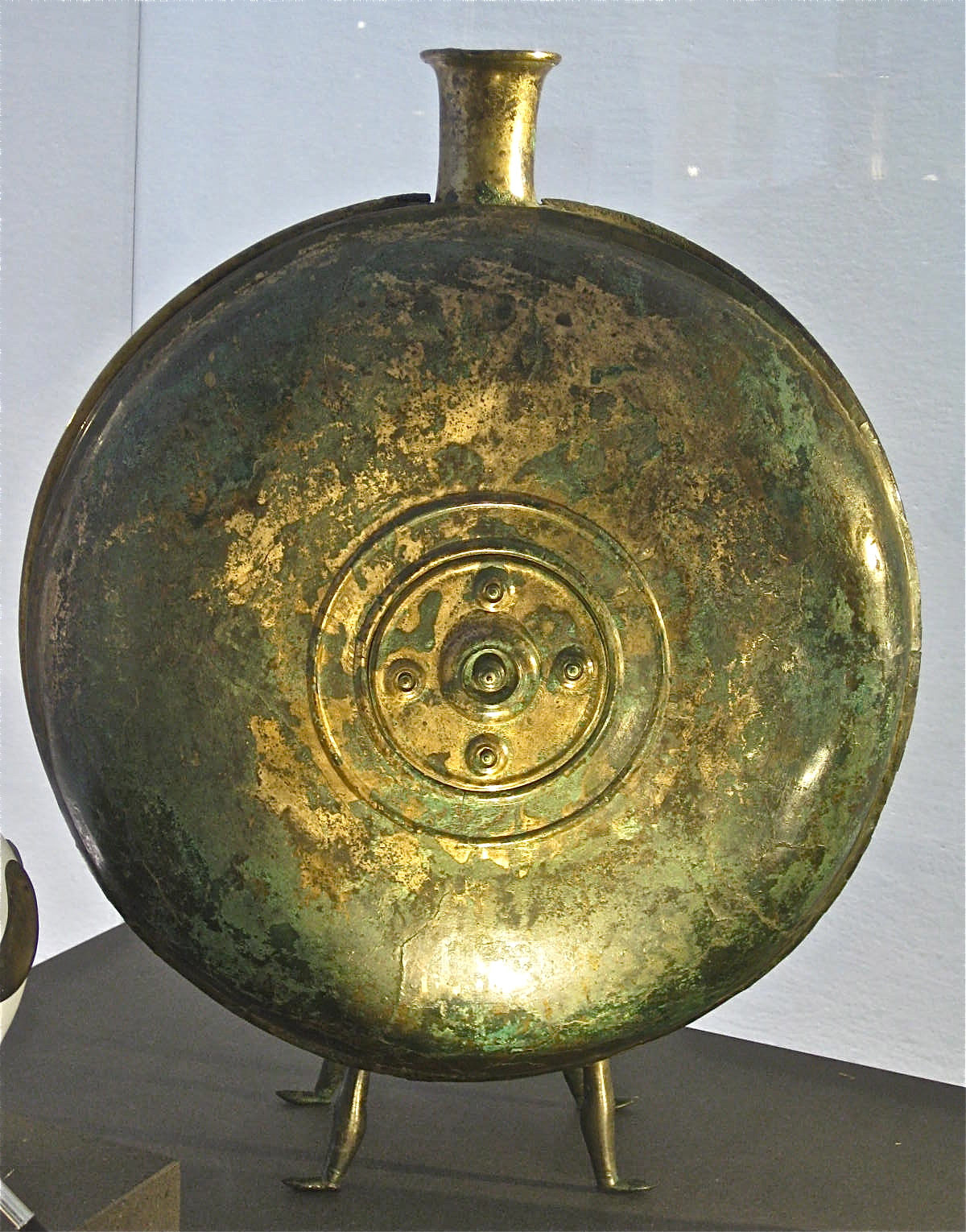
Keltenmuseum, Hallein. Bronze "Pilgrim' flask

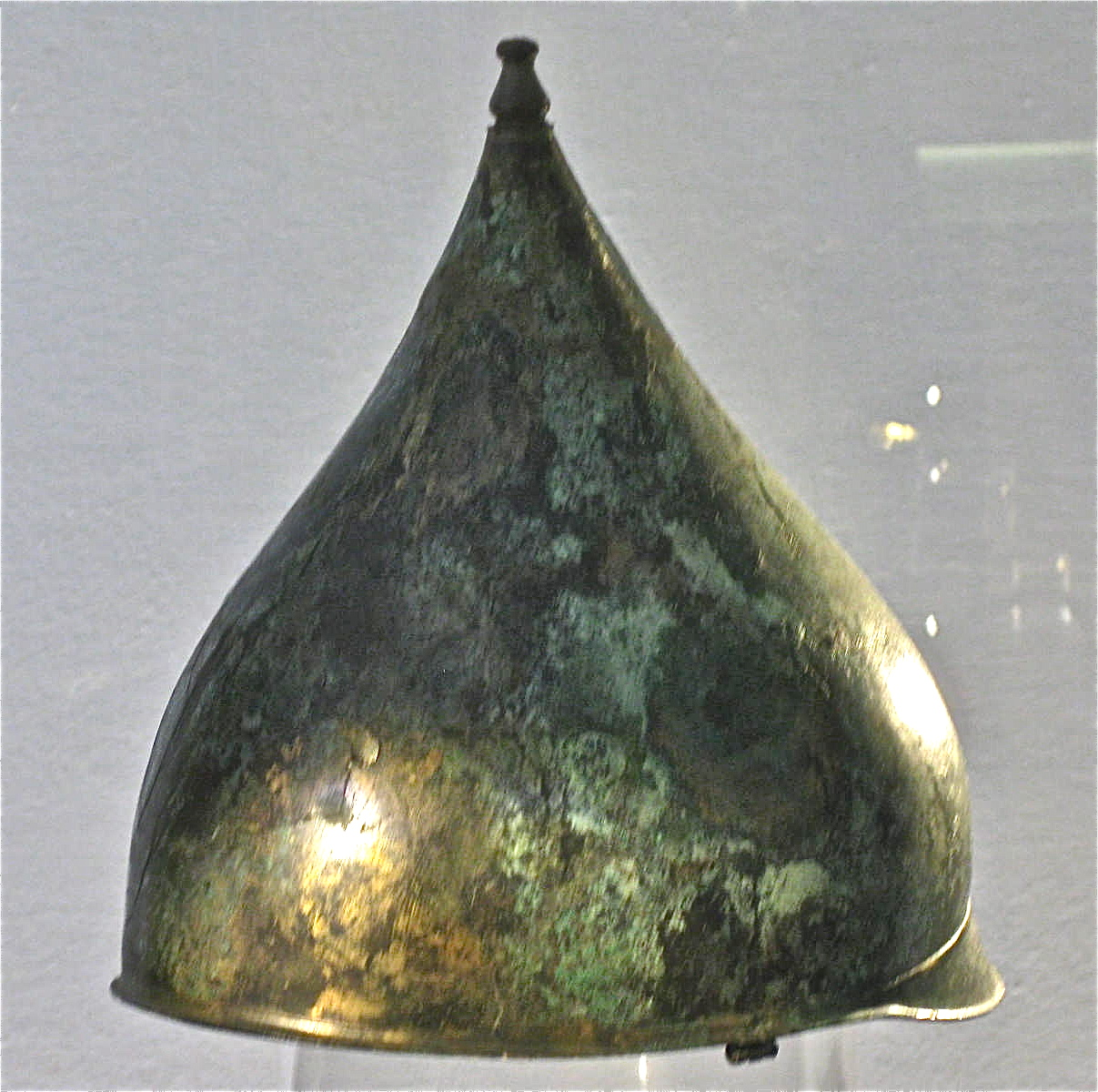
Keltenmuseum, Hallein. Finds from the Salt Mines at Dürrnberg Fürstengrab 44 . Helmet

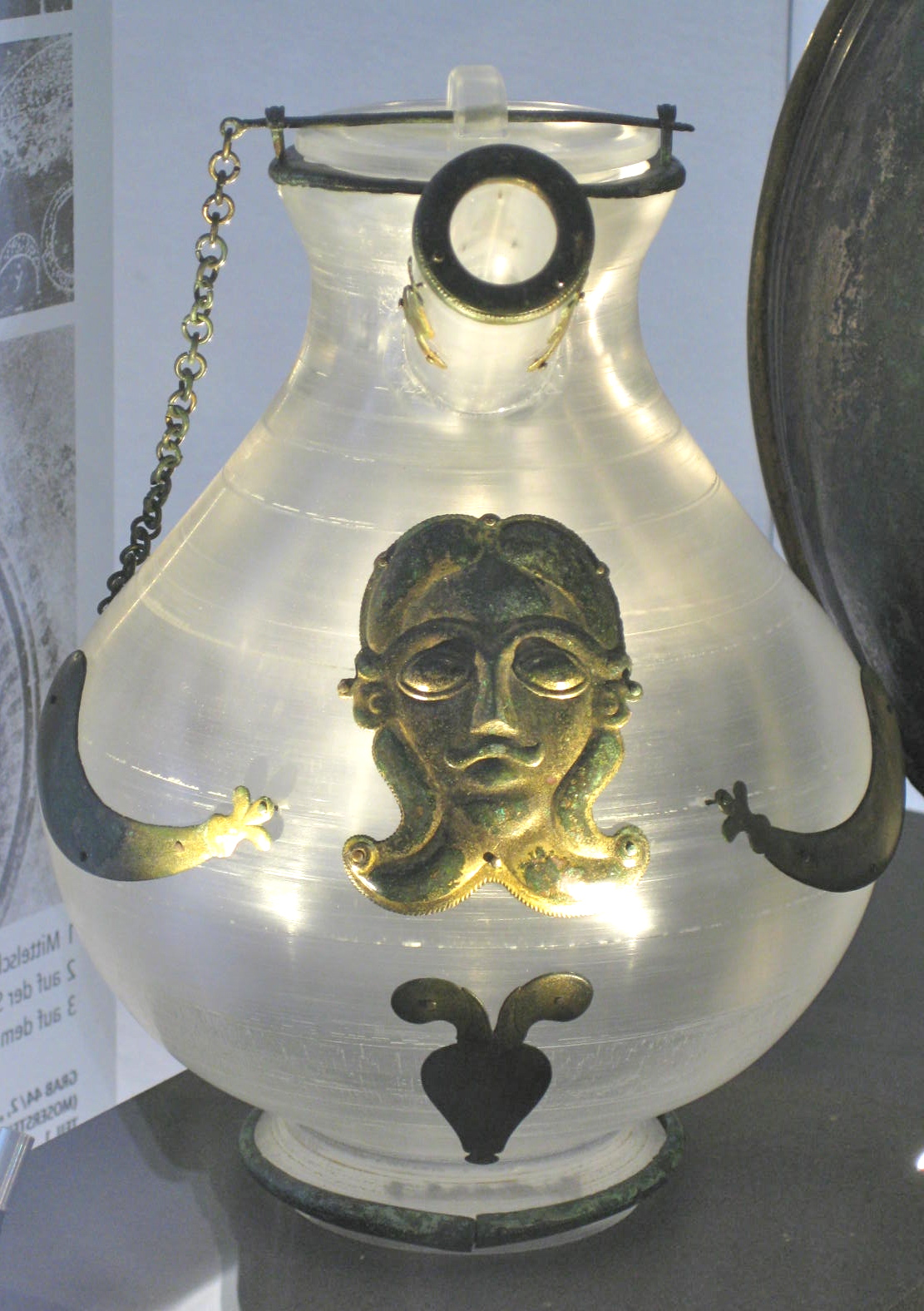
Keltenmuseum, Hallein. Jug -glass replica- with bronze mounting.

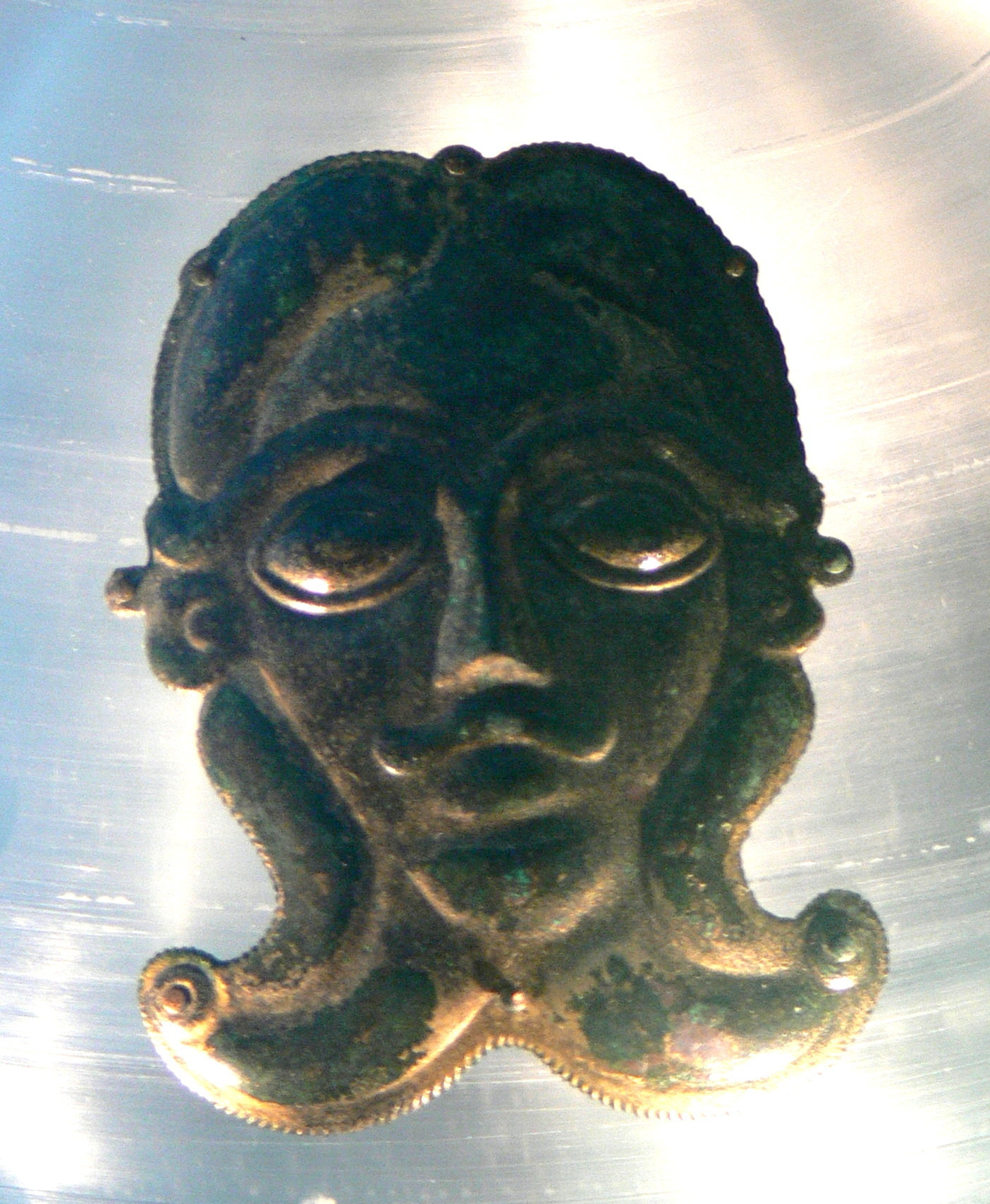
Fürstengrab 44 Kanne

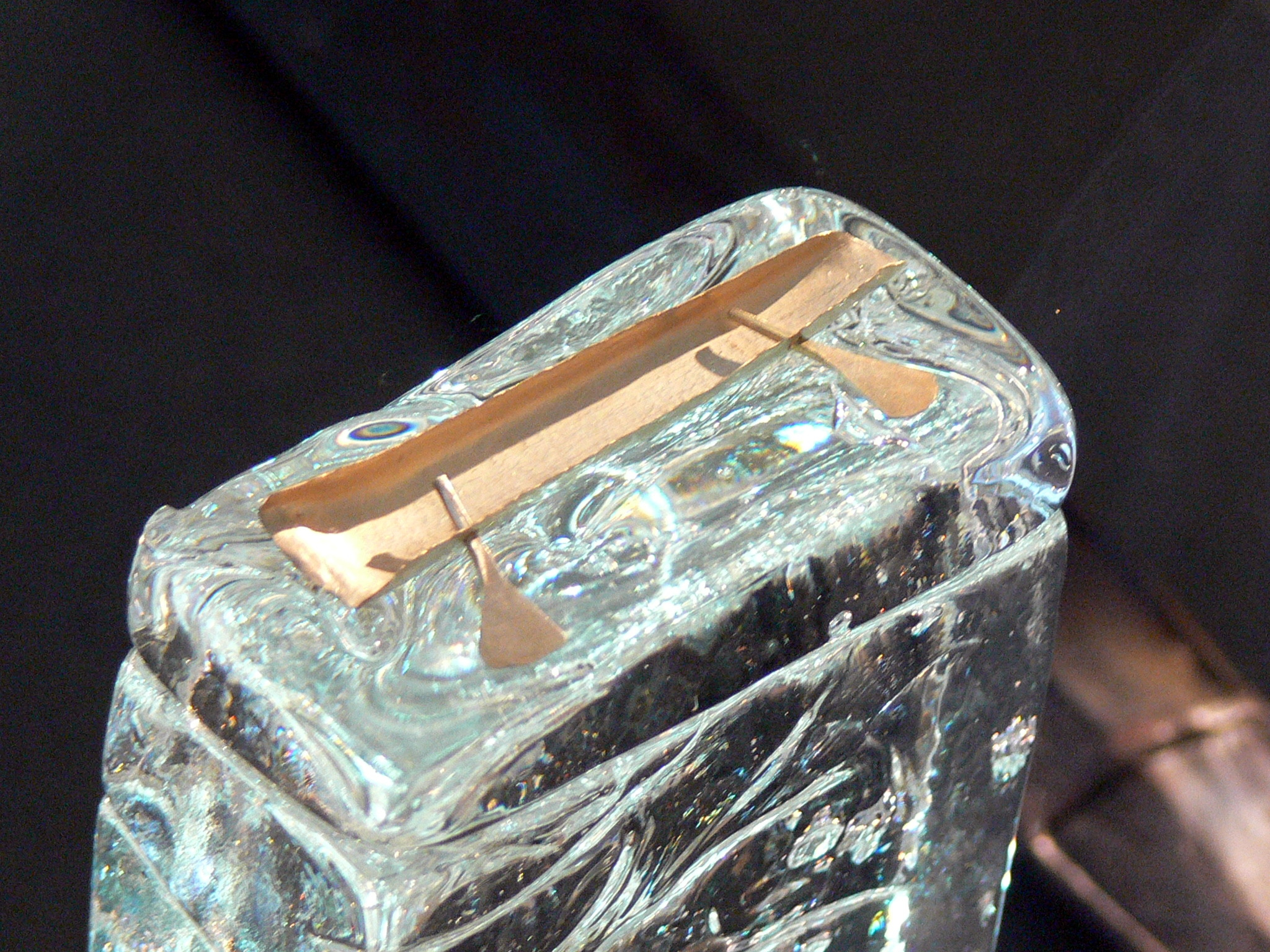
Fürstengrab 44 Gold boat with oars

=== Grave 67 ===
Amber Necklace

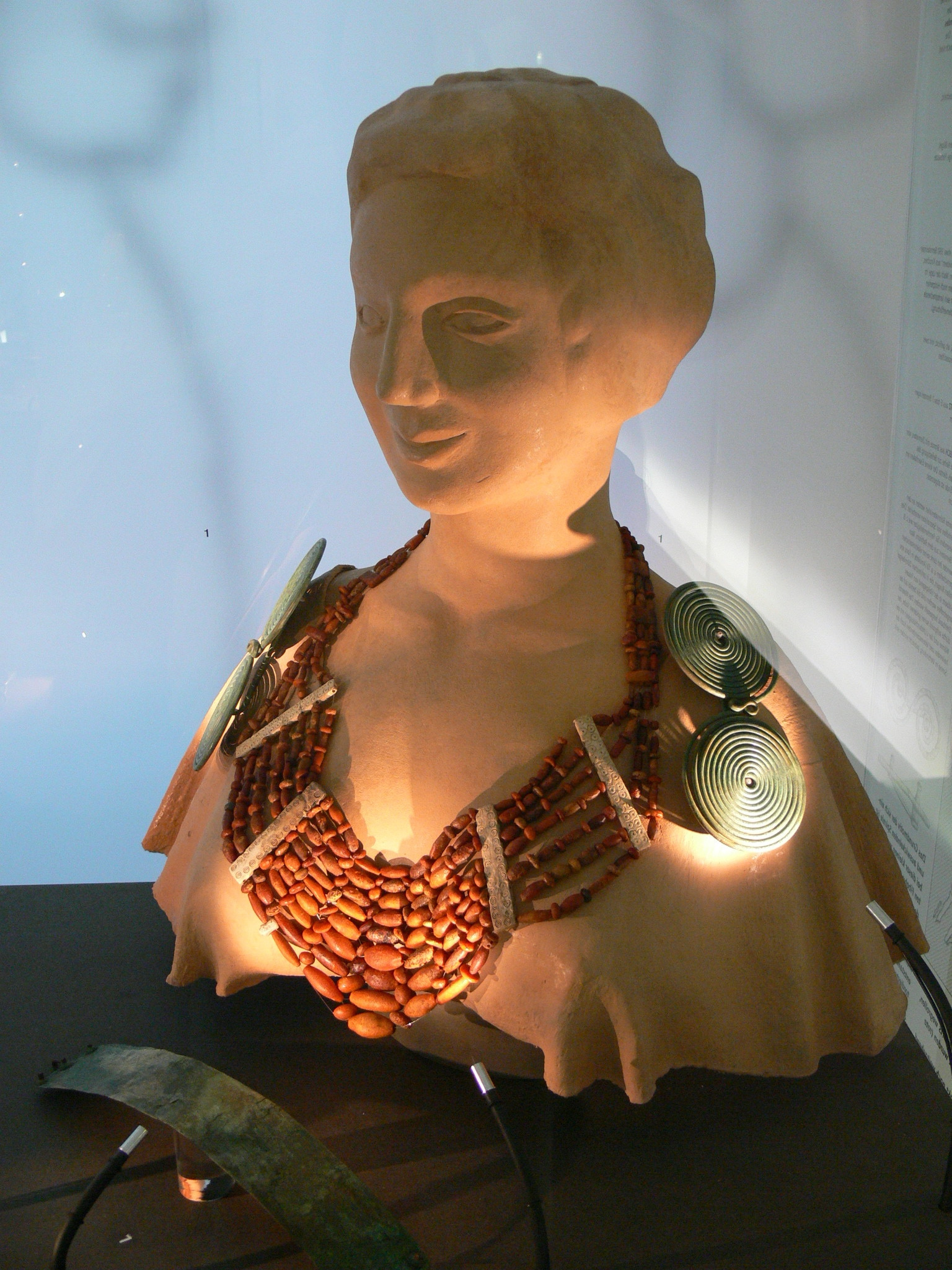
KMH - Grab 67 Schmuck

=== Grave 68 ===
Celtic jewellery, including an amber ring pearl ( 500-460 BC ), from grave 68 at Eislfeld.

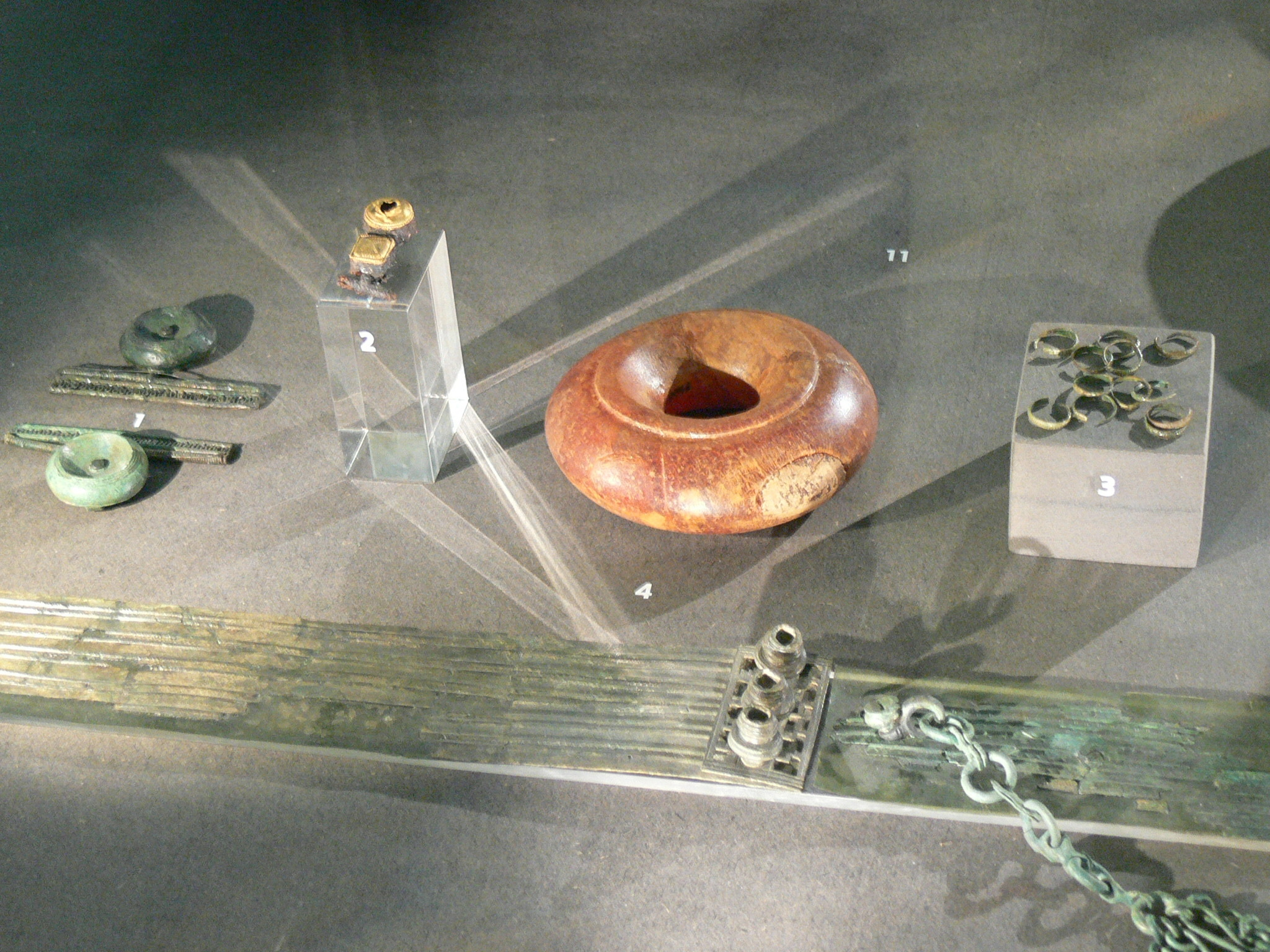
KMH - Grave 68

=== Grave 112 ===
The magnificent decorated Celtic bronze Dürrnberg Flagon (Ger. 'Schnabelkanne') of the 5th century BC, was originally in the collection of the Museum Carolino-Augusteum in Salzburg, but has now been transferred to the Keltenmuseum. There are two immediate parallels to this jug, the pair of flagons in the British Museum from a probable burial at Basse-Yutz in the French Moselle Valley. These vessels essentially copy Greek and Etruscan jugs, with added Celtic Zoomorphic art. In the case of the Hallein jug, there is evidence of Scythian influence. The burial mound was excavated in 1932 and was found to be largely robbed out, but there was evidence for a two-wheeled chariot similar to that found in grave 44 on the Moserstein and the jug was also found. and the discovery was reported in the Illustrated London News in 1936. The jug was studied in 1944 by Paul Jacobsthal in his 'Early Celtic Art'.

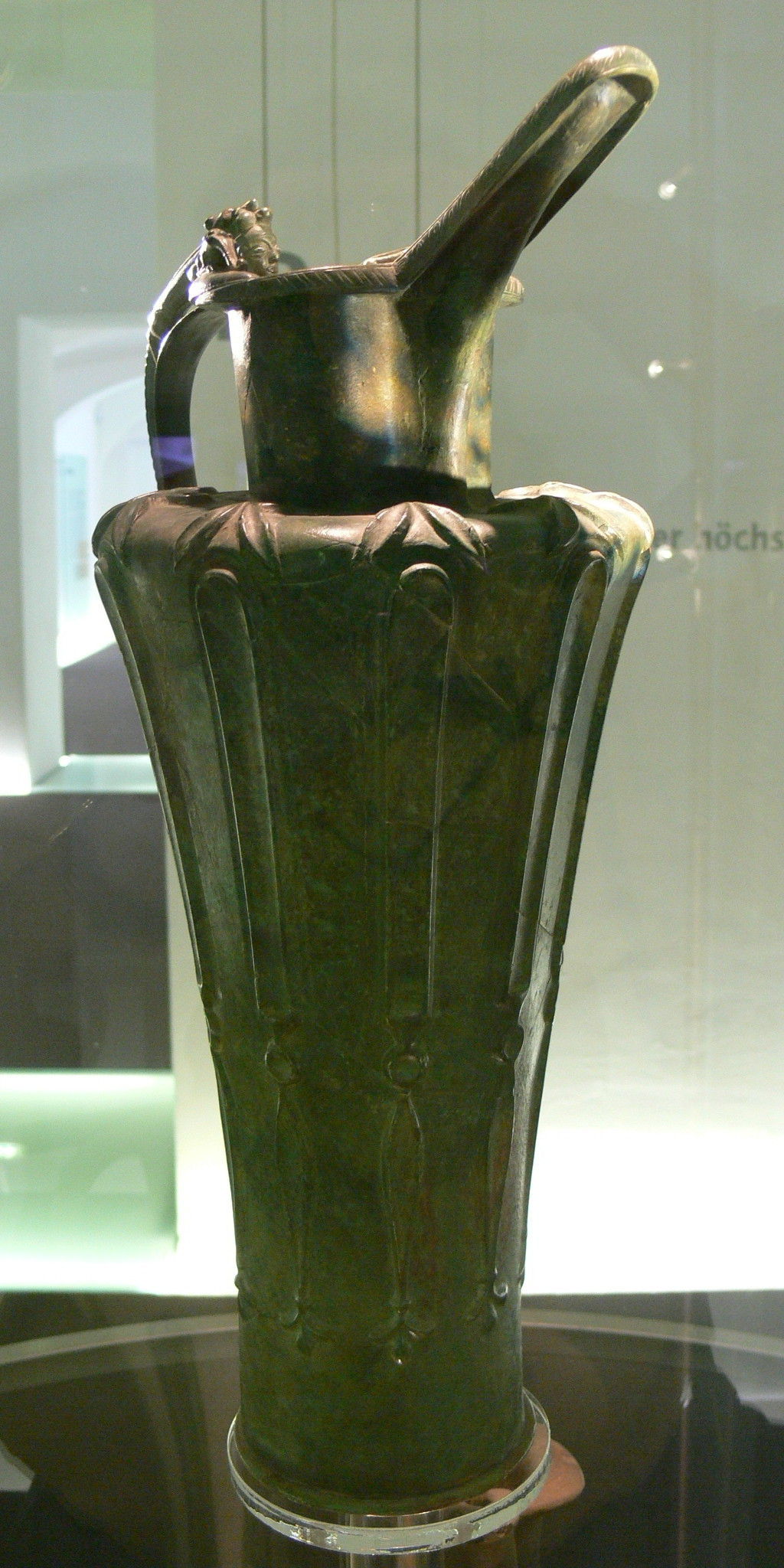
Kanne vom Dürnberg

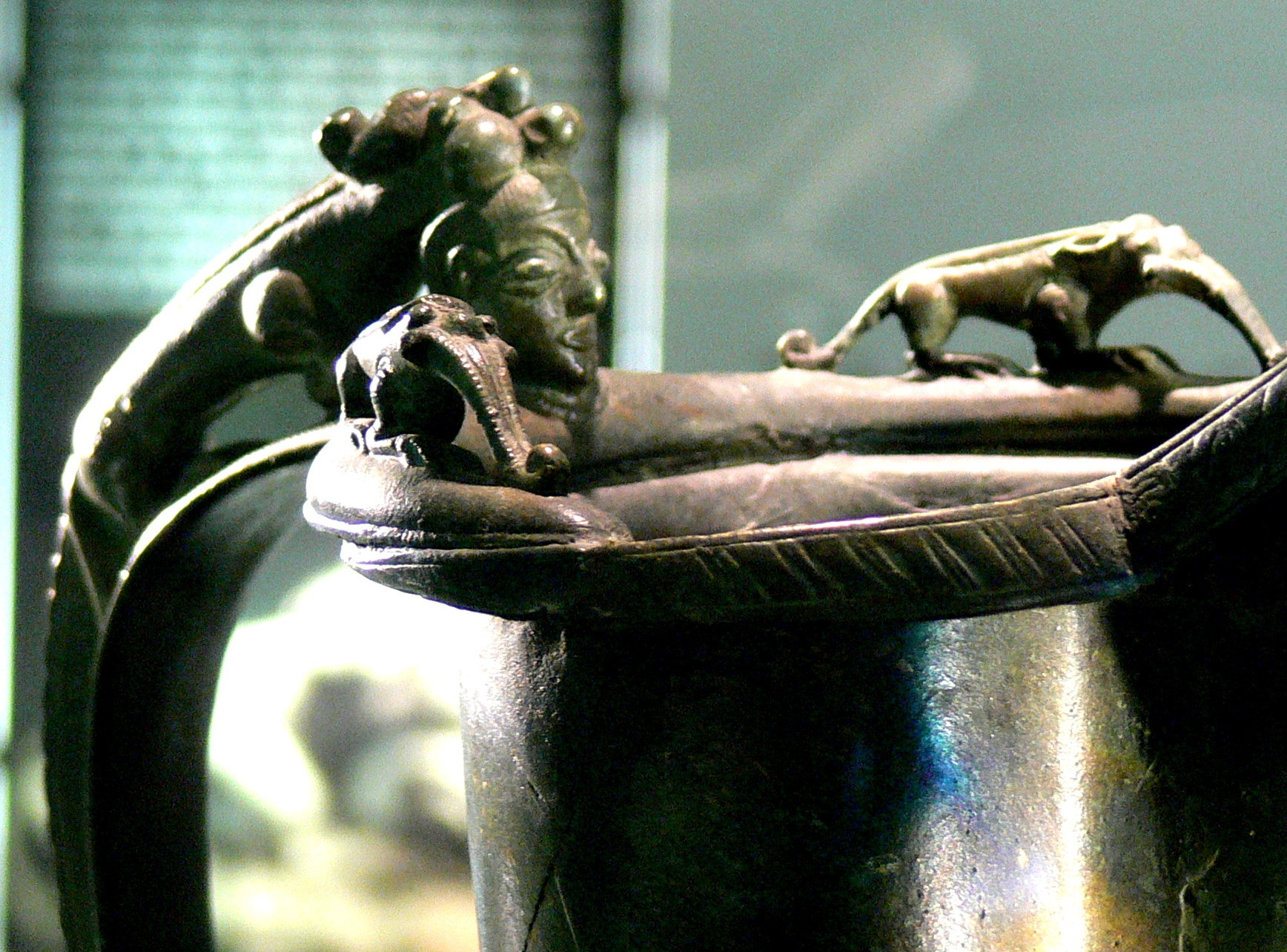
Kanne vom Dürnberg

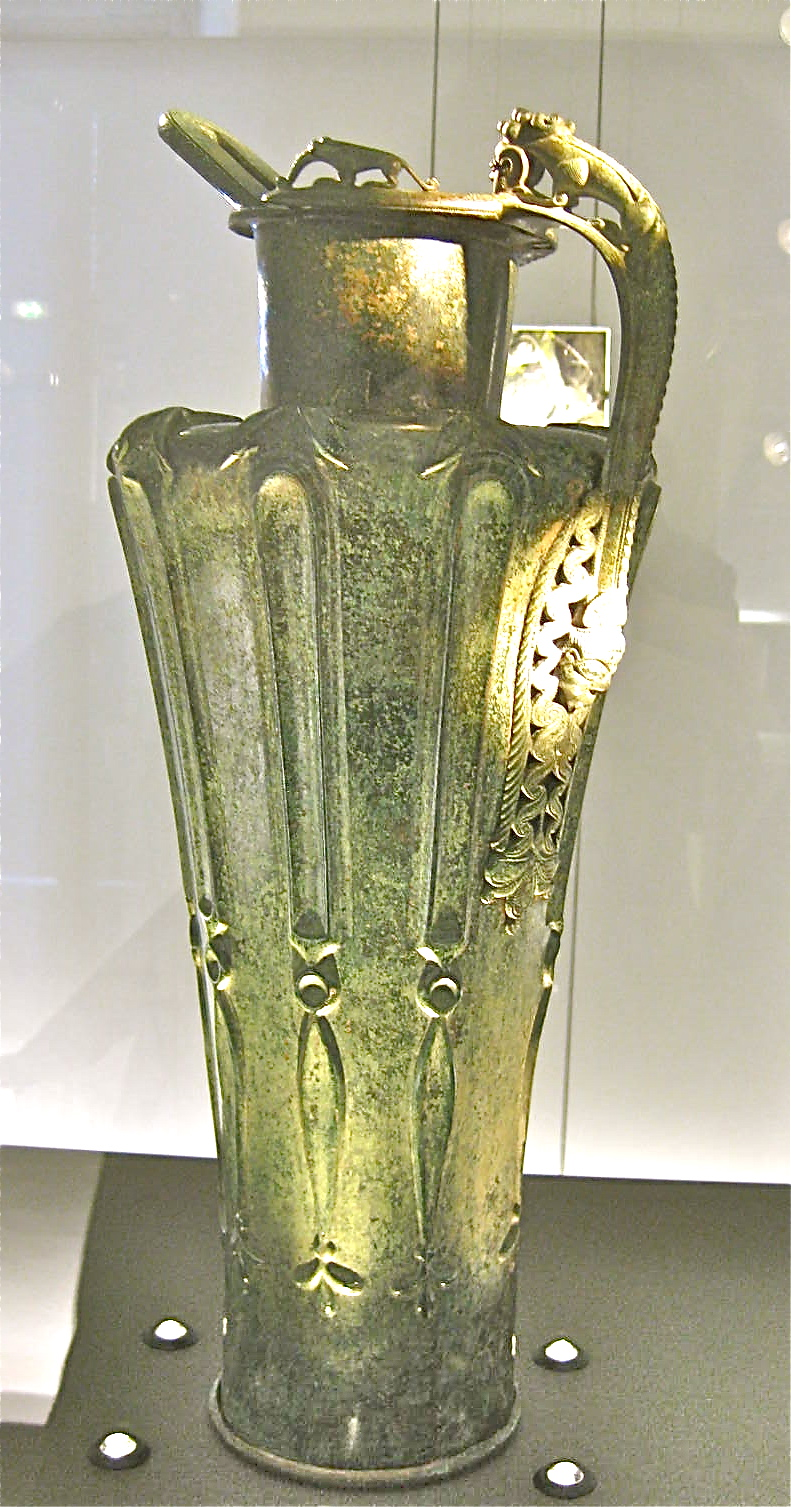
Hallein, Keltenmuseum

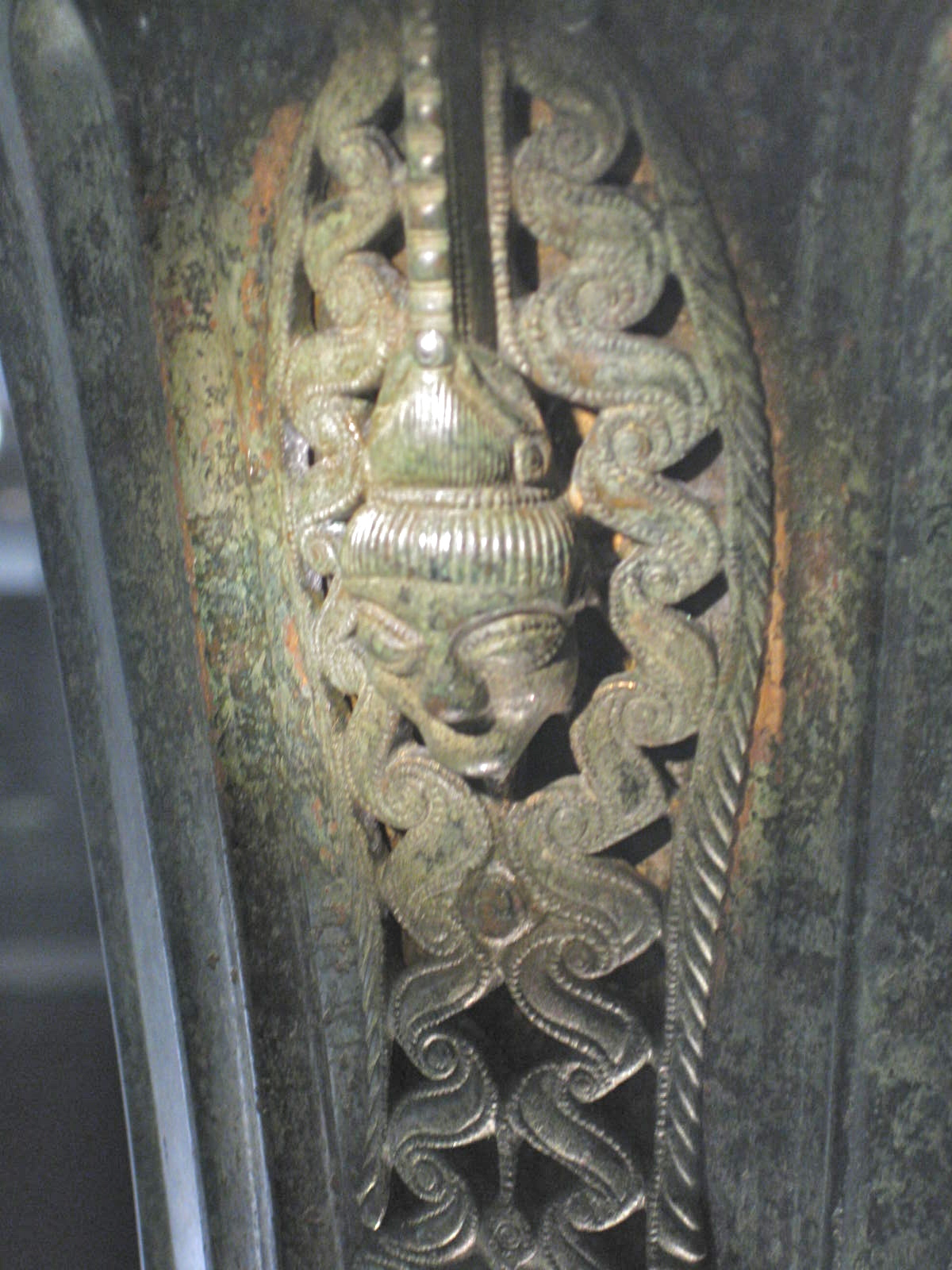
Hallein, Keltenmuseum

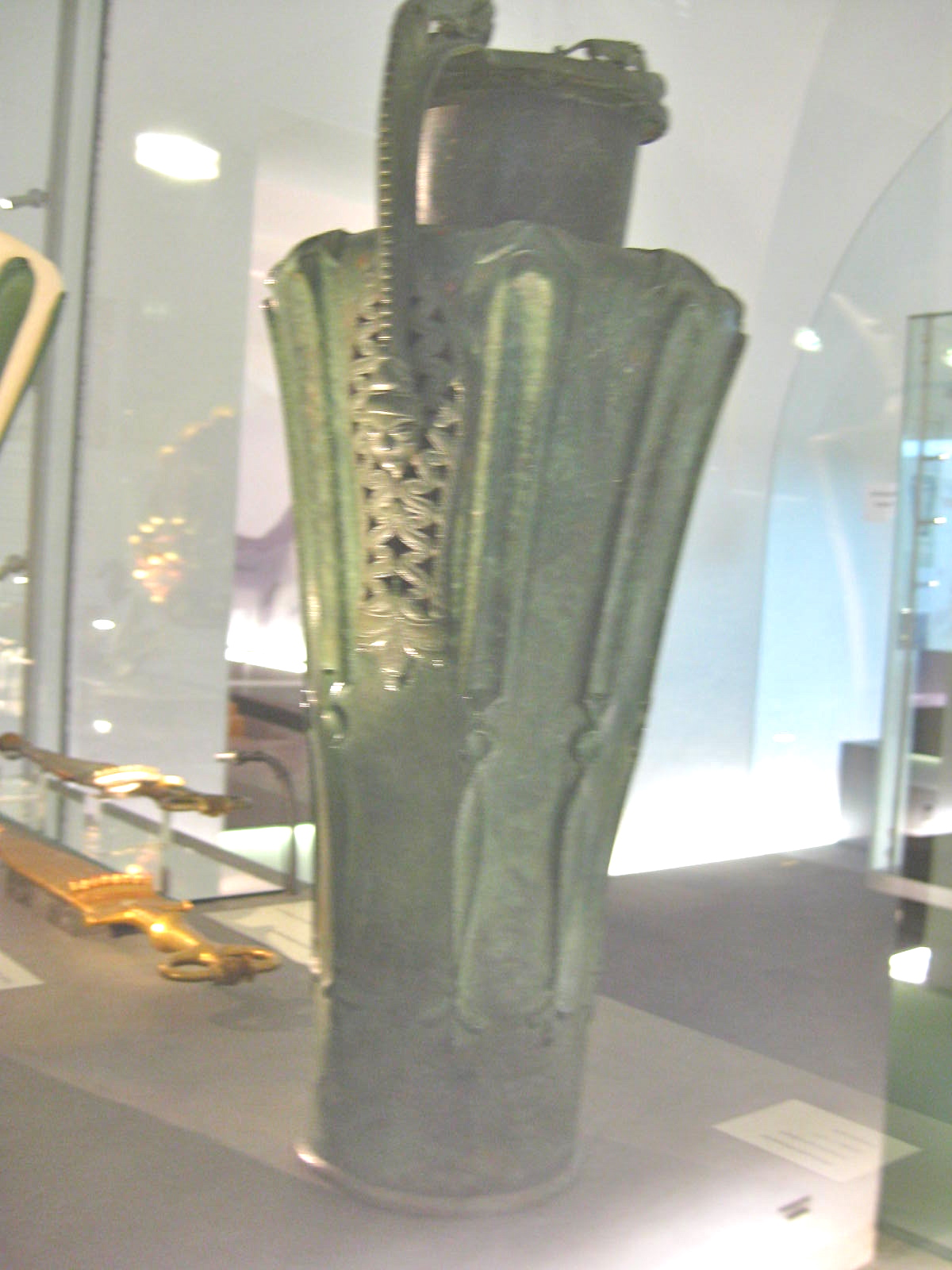
Hallein, Keltenmuseum

=== Grave 253, Simonsbauerfeld. ===
Double burial Simonsbauerfeld

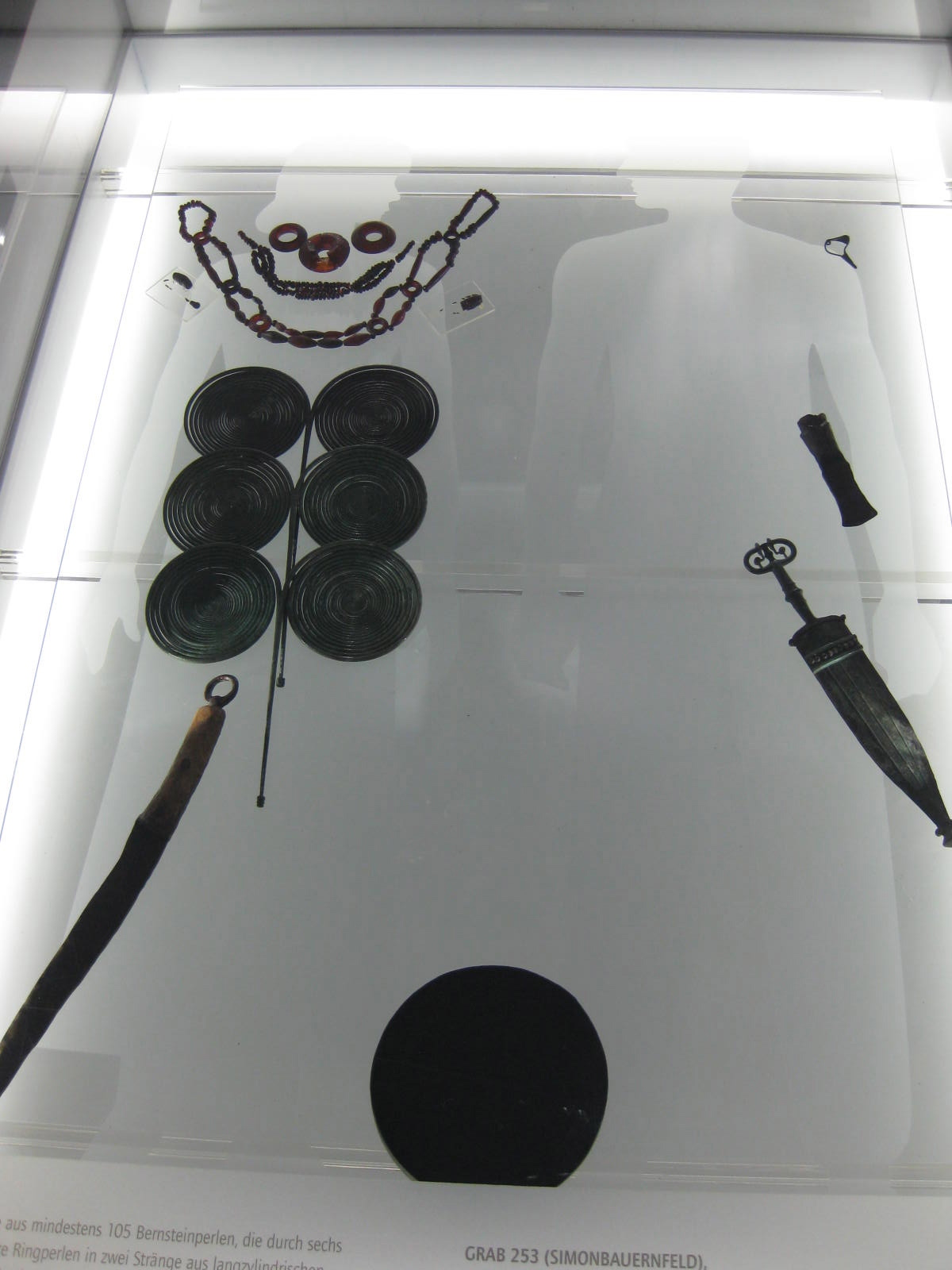
Hallein, Keltenmuseum

=== Grave 317, Lettenbühel ===
Celtic bowl ( 350-330 BC ), from grave 317 at Lettenbühel.

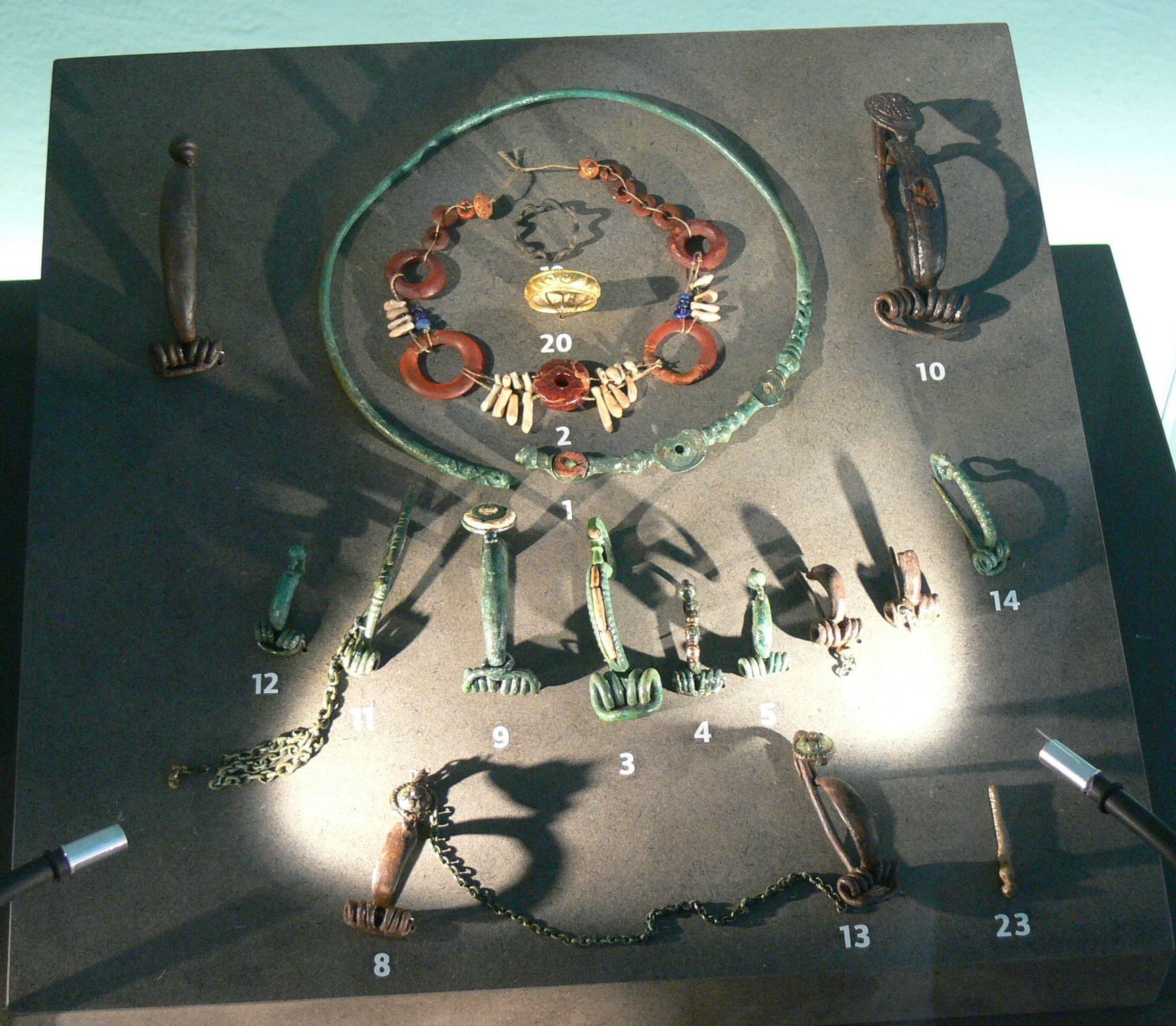
Grab 317 Jewellery

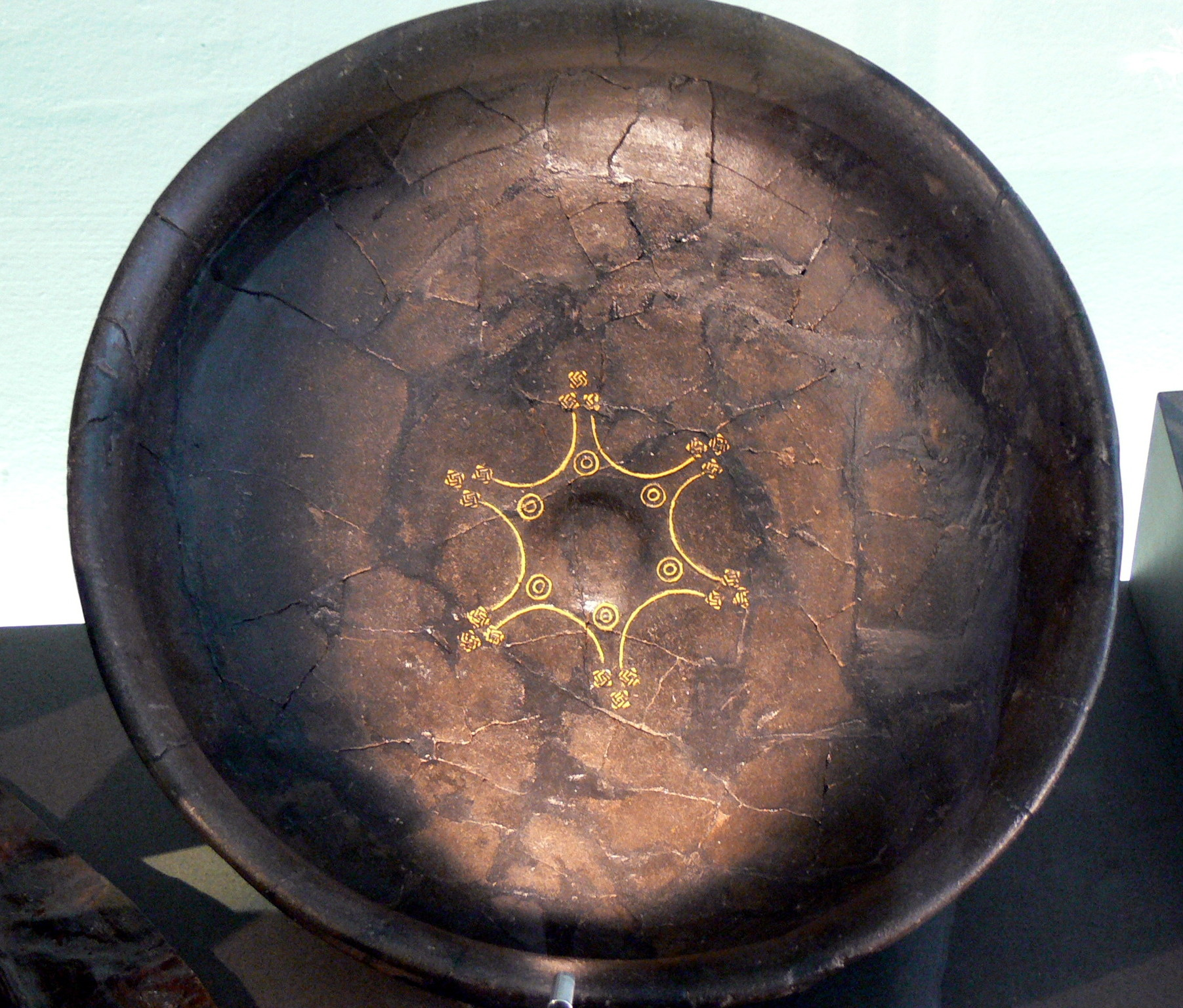
Grab 317 Platter

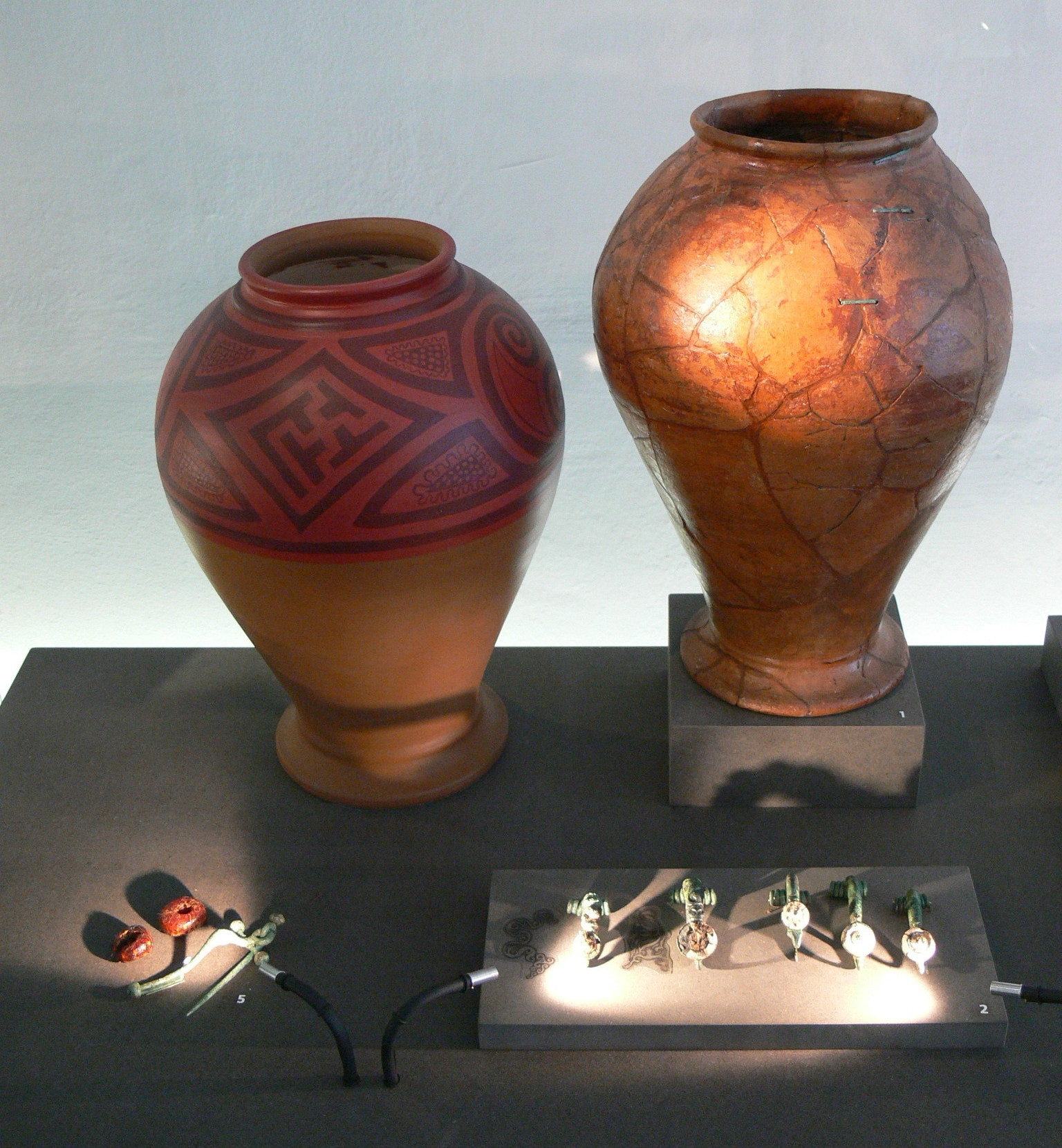
Grab 317 Pottery

=== Grave 346, Kranzbichl. ===
Fragment of an Etruscan situla, from grave 346 at Kranzbichl.

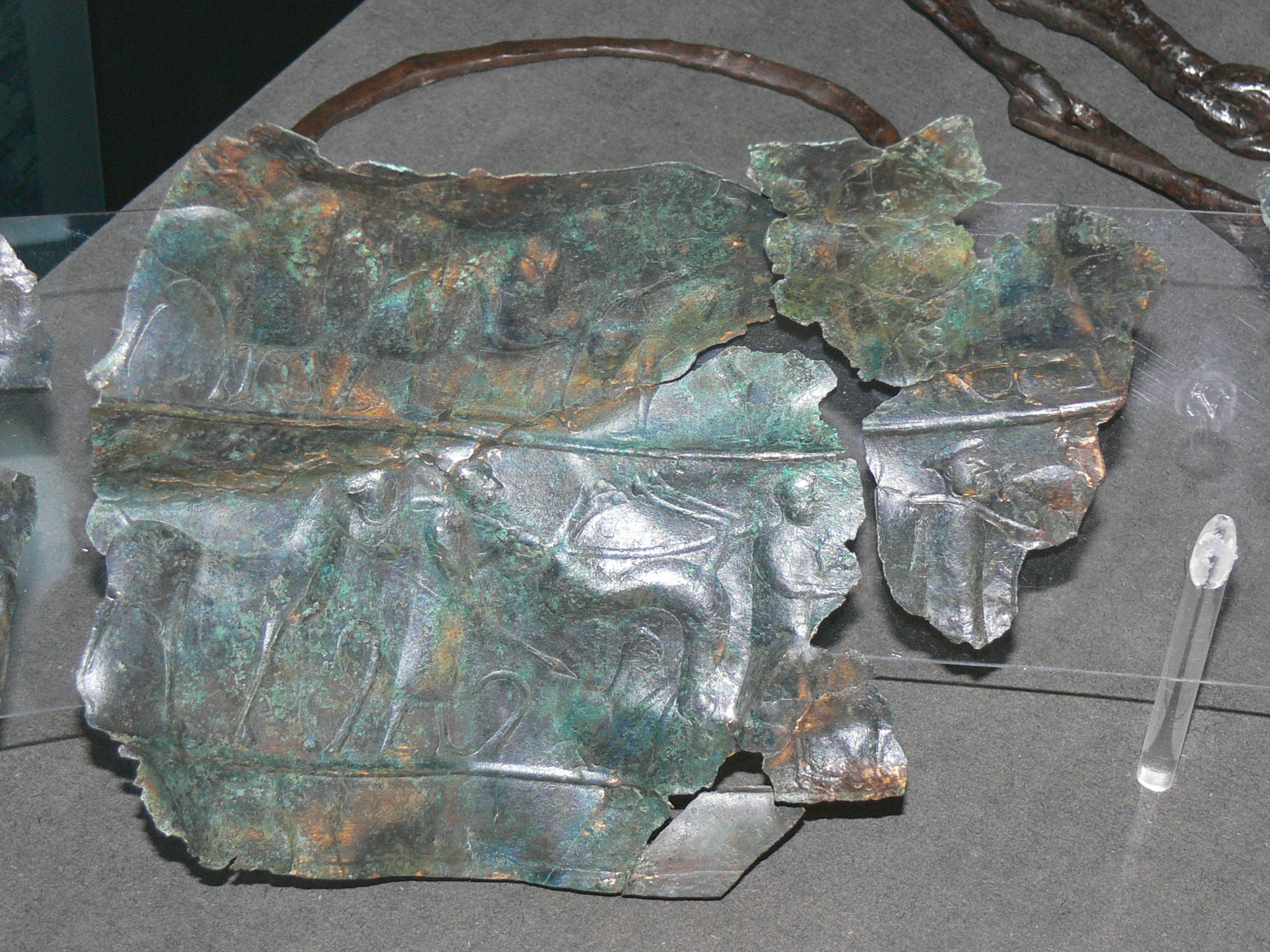
KMH - Situla 2

=== Grave 352 ===
Birch Bark Hat. A similar hat to this was also found in the Hochdorf Chieftain's Grave

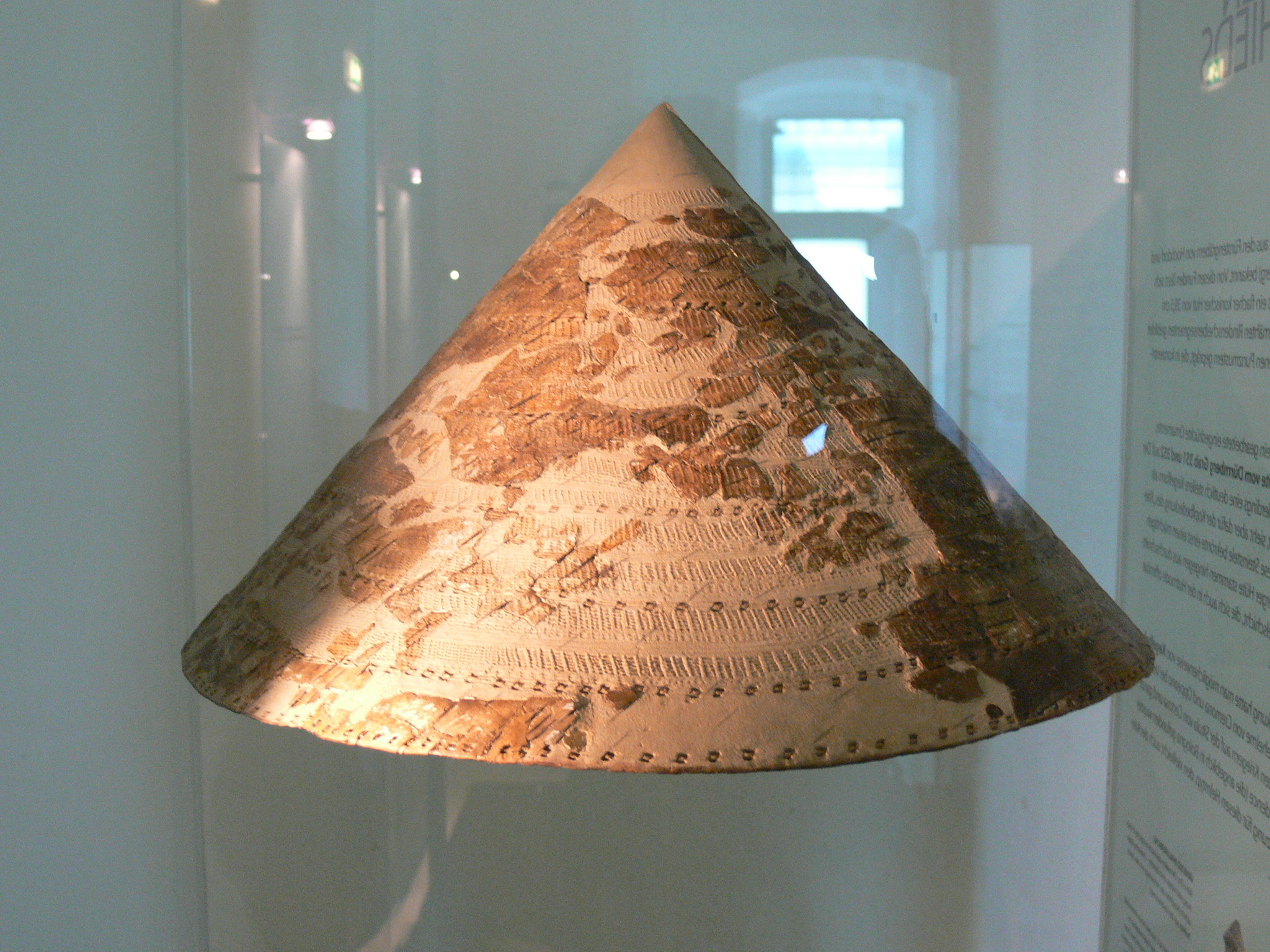
Birch Bark Hat.

=== Grave 353 ===
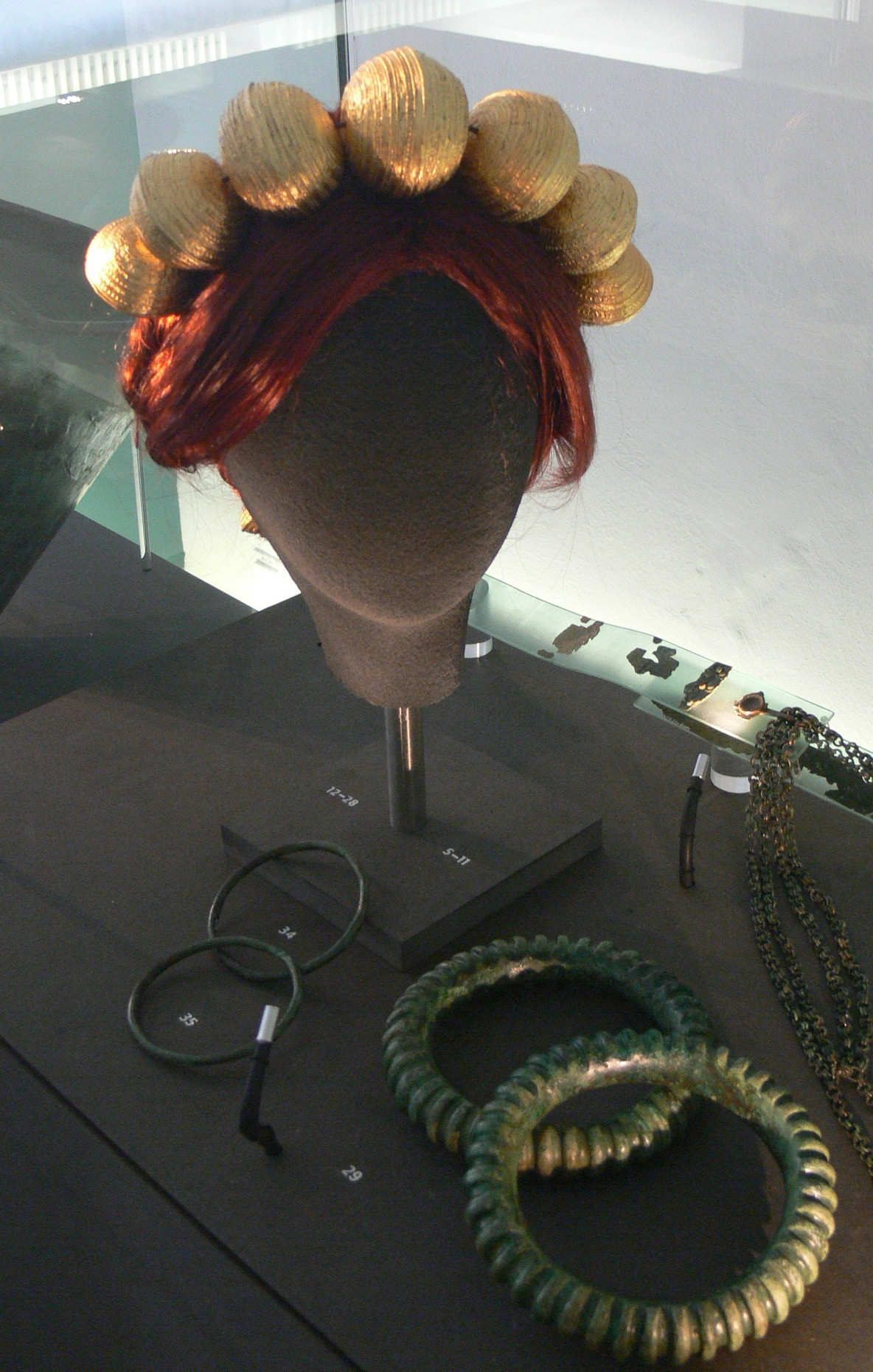
Grave 353 Jewellery

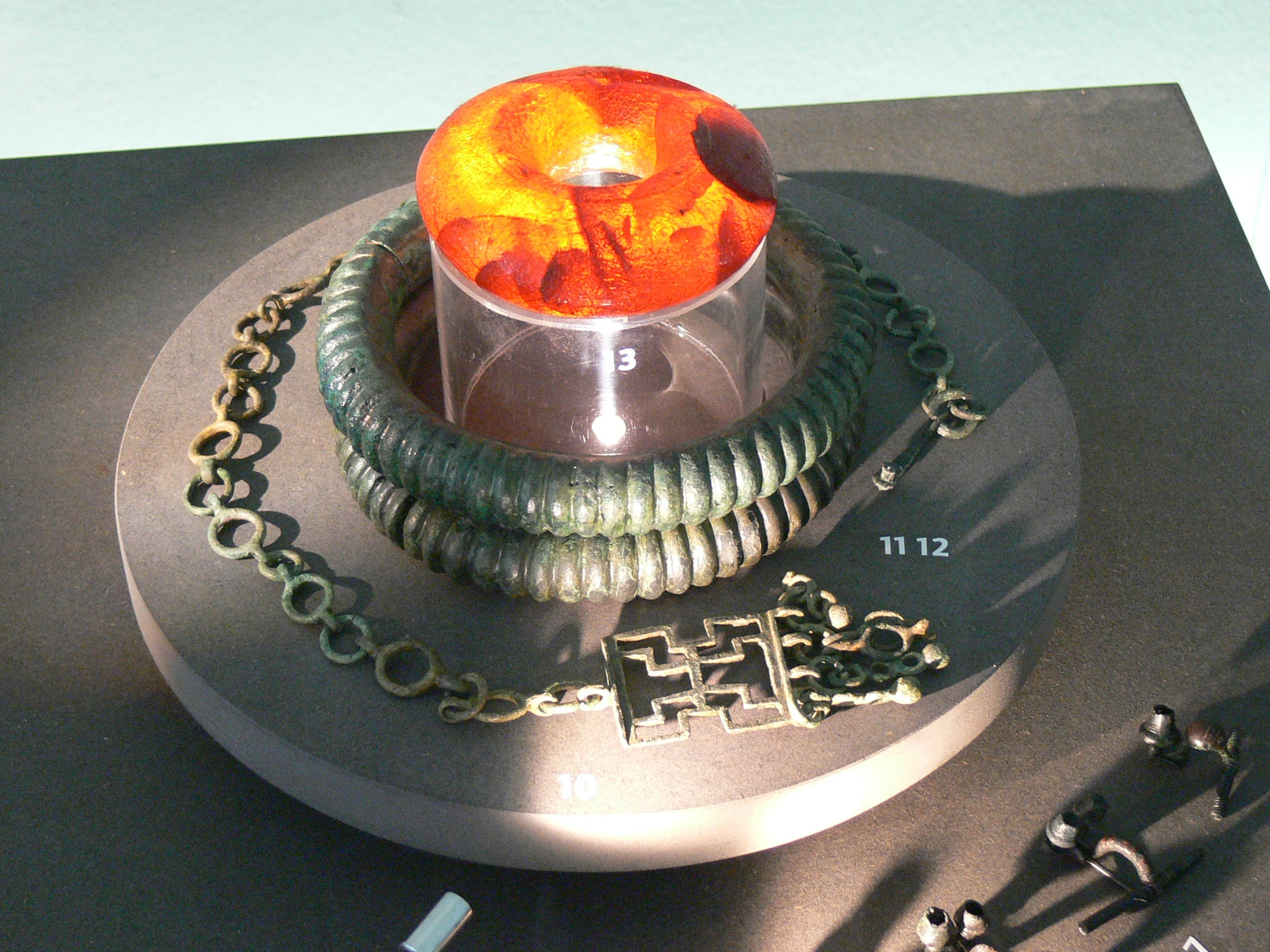
Grave 353 Jewellery

== Gallery of other discoveries and Replicas/Reconstructions ==
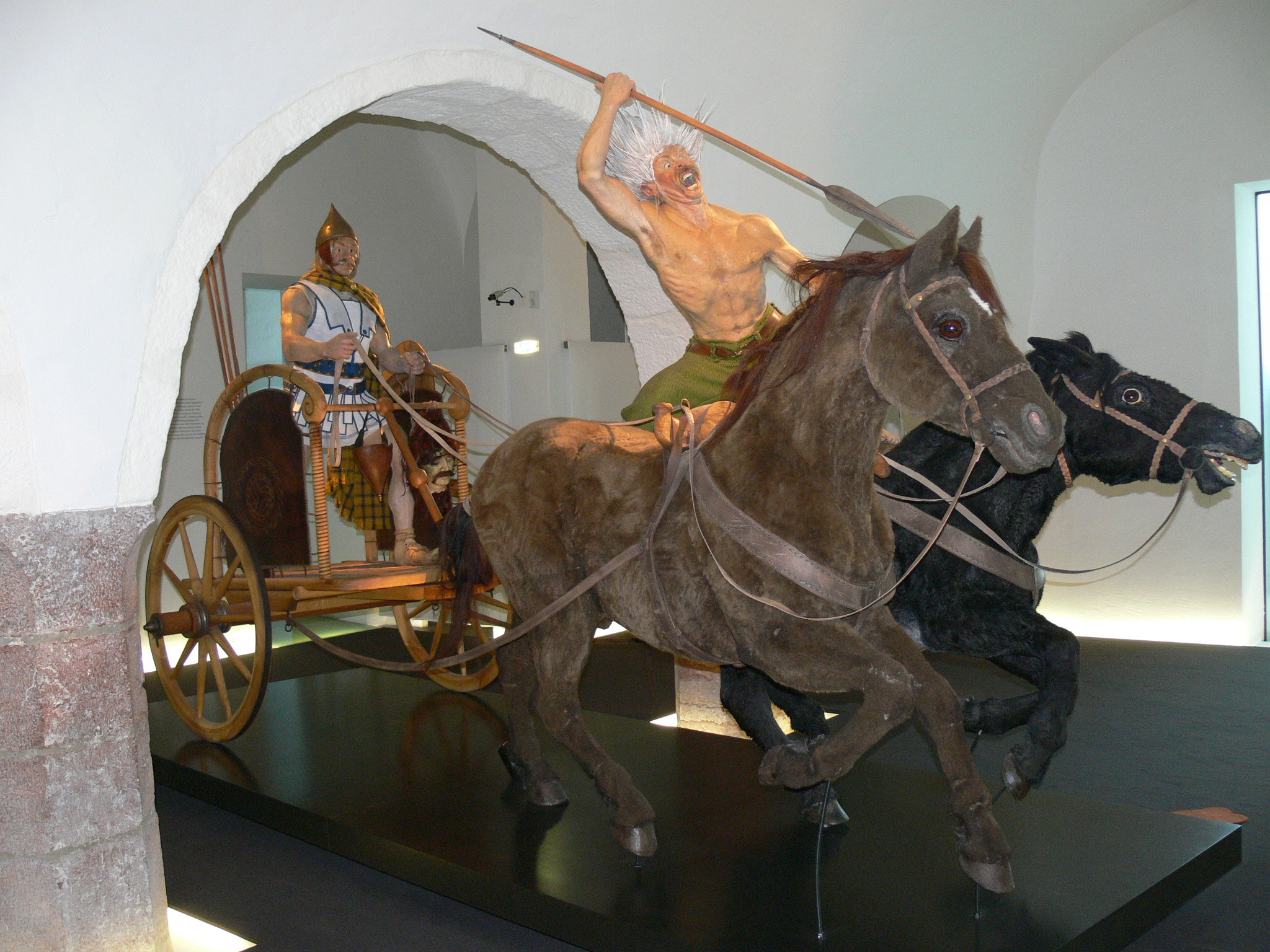
Imaginative re-construction of the chariot found in Grave 44

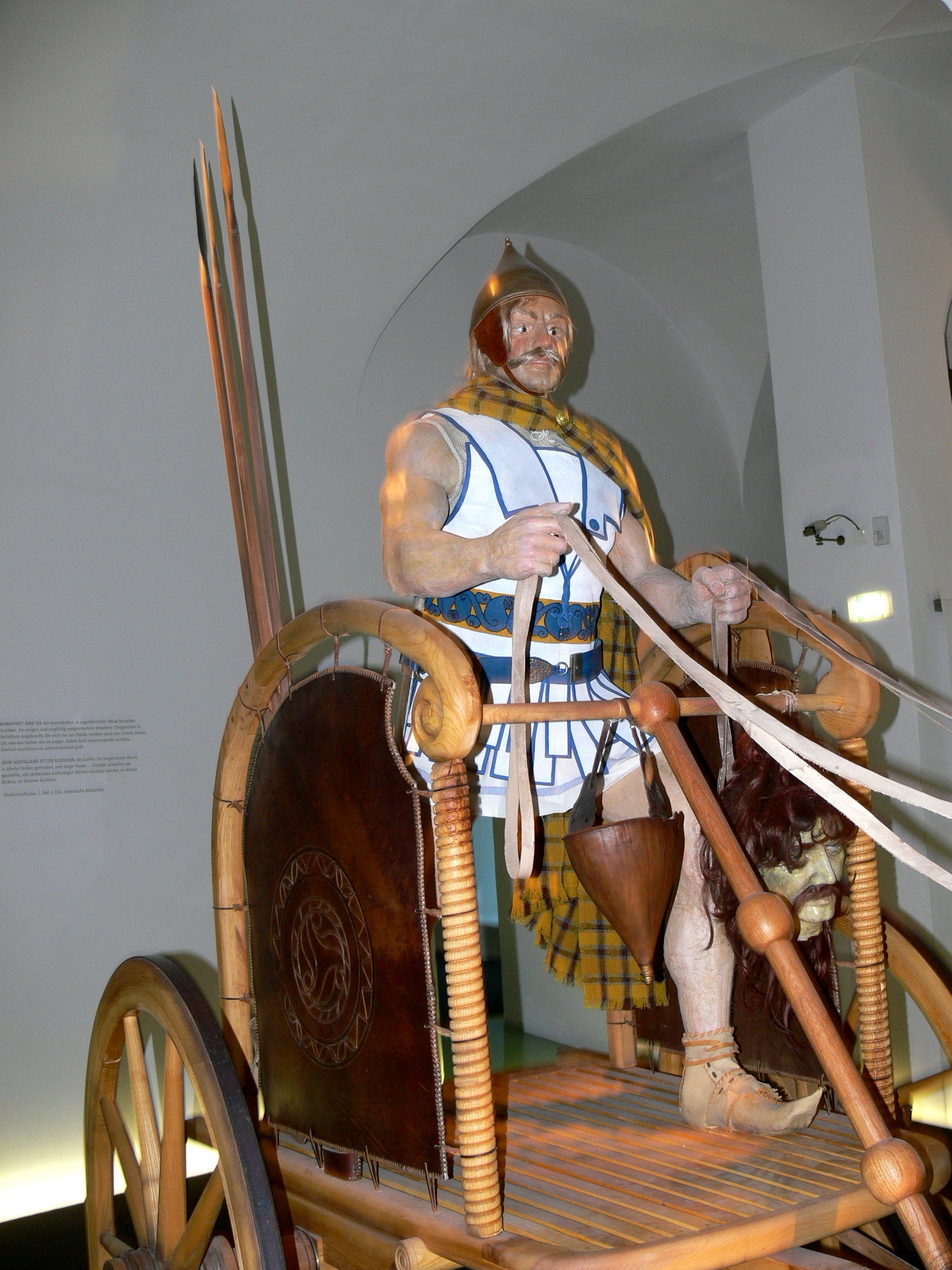
Hallein Keltenmuseum - Streitwagen 2

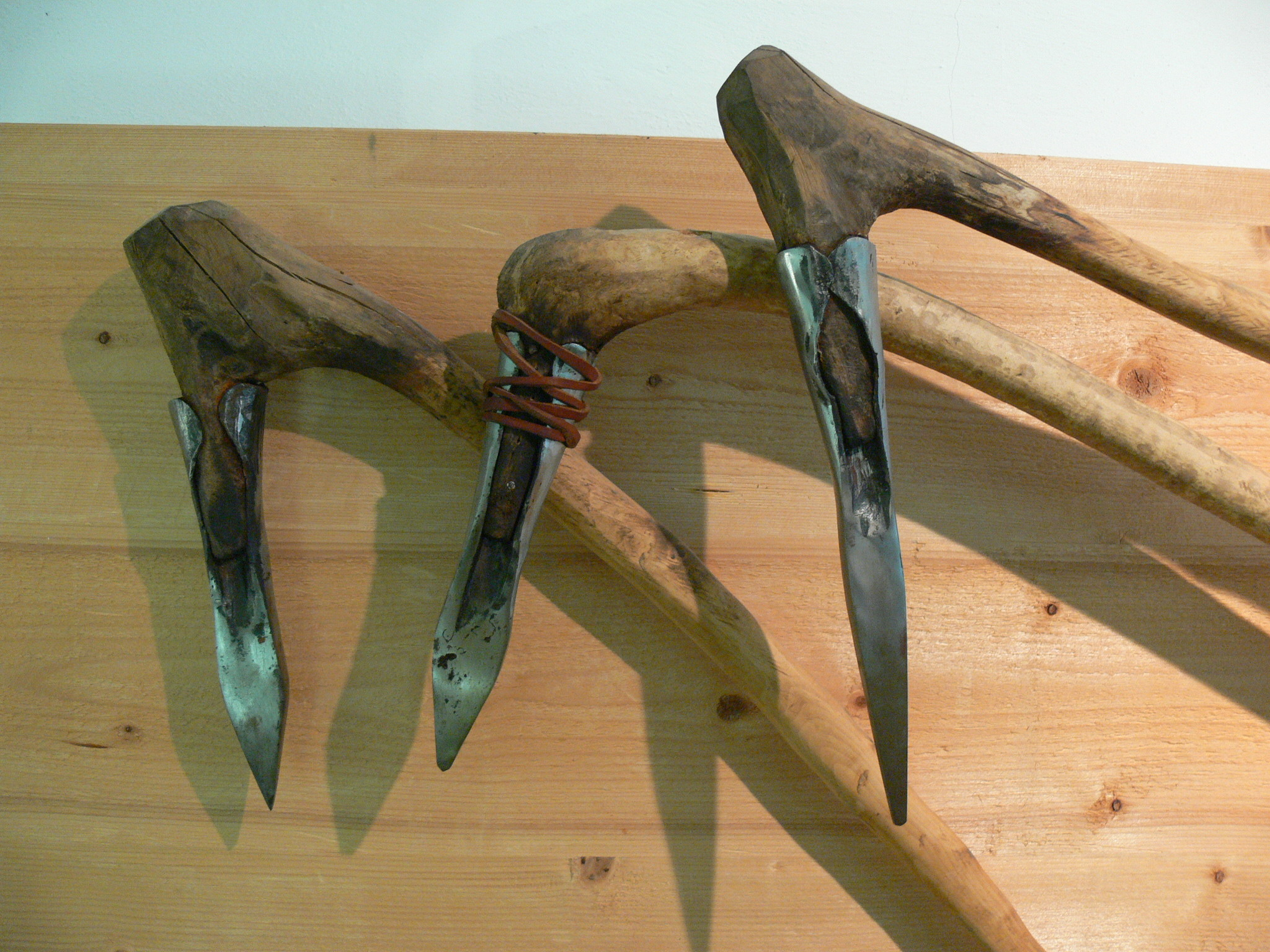
Replicas of pickaxes used by the Salt Miners.

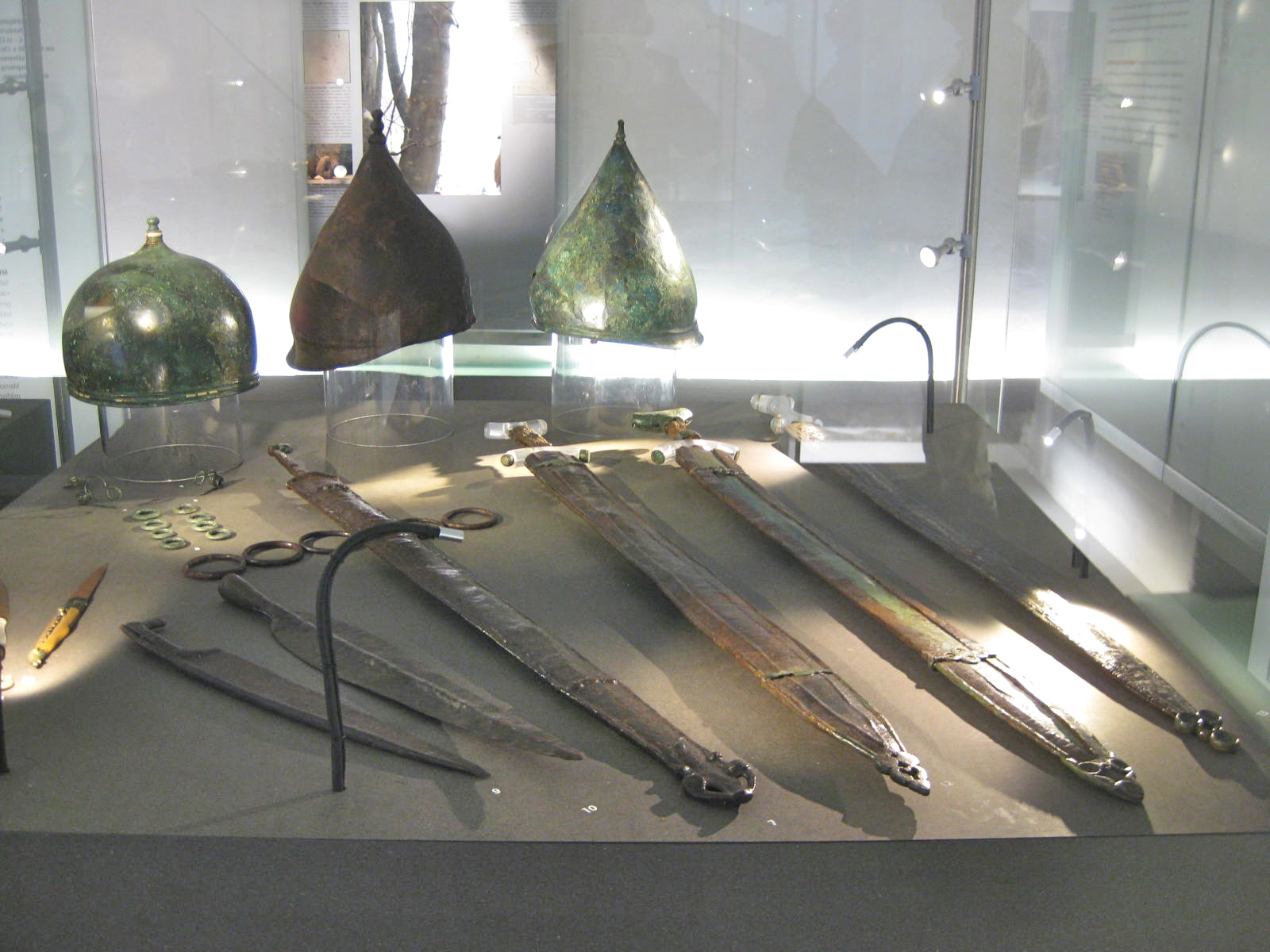
Helmets, knives and La Tene swords.

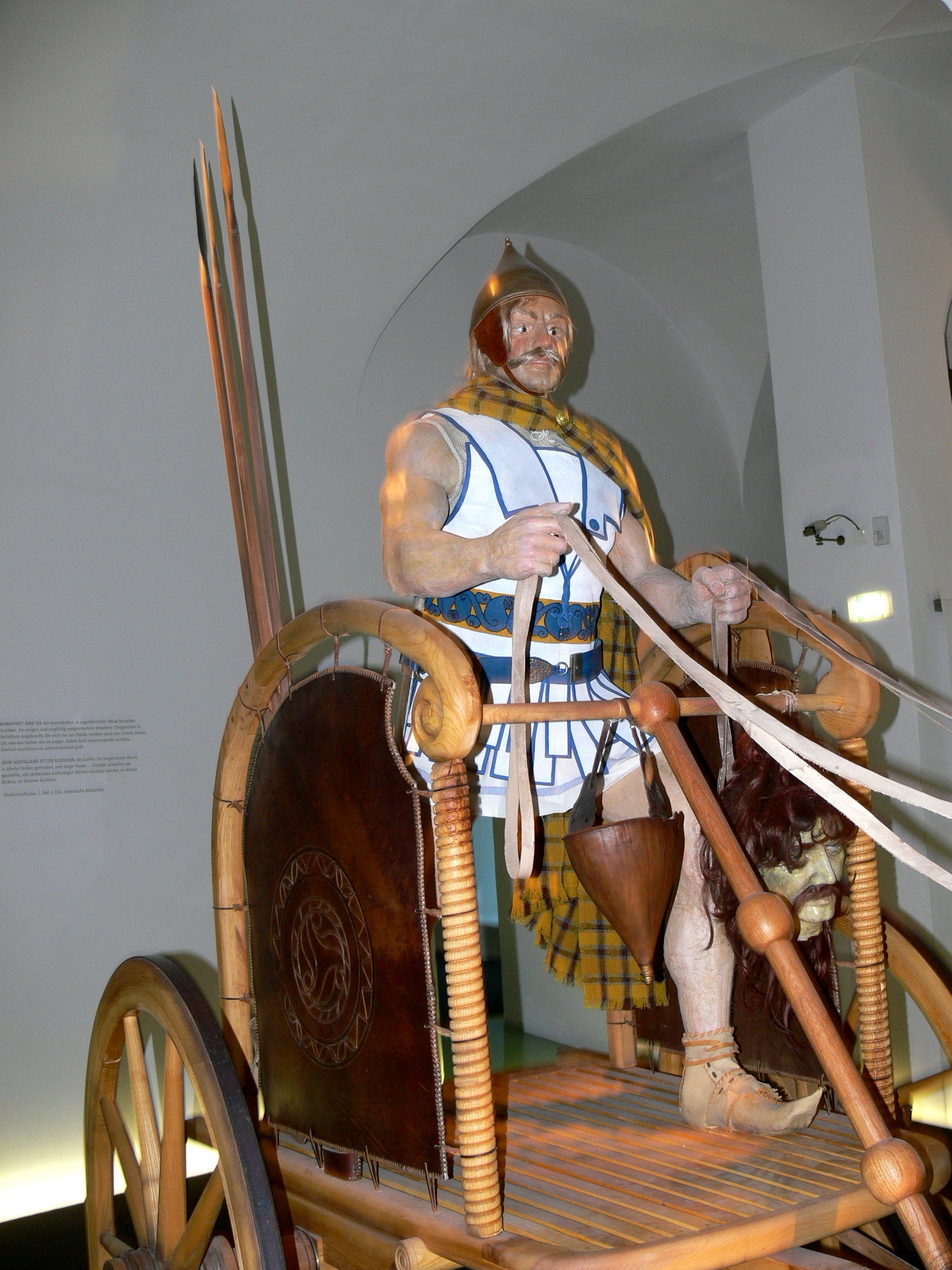
The prince or charioteer from Grave 44

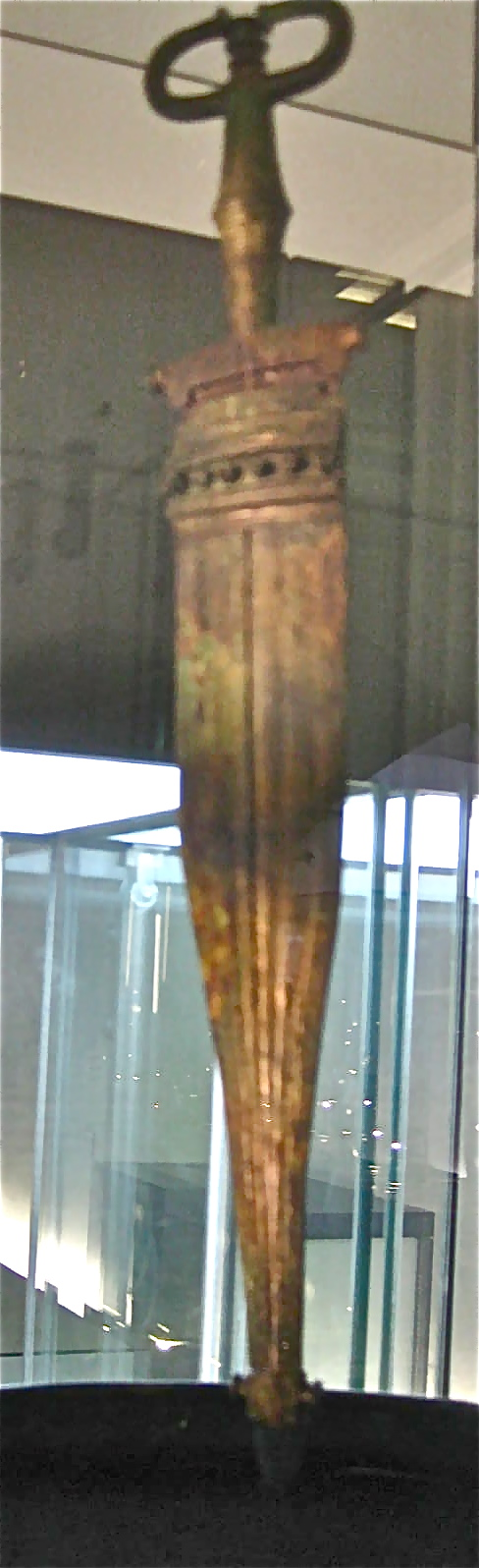
Hallstatt D 'Antenna' dagger.

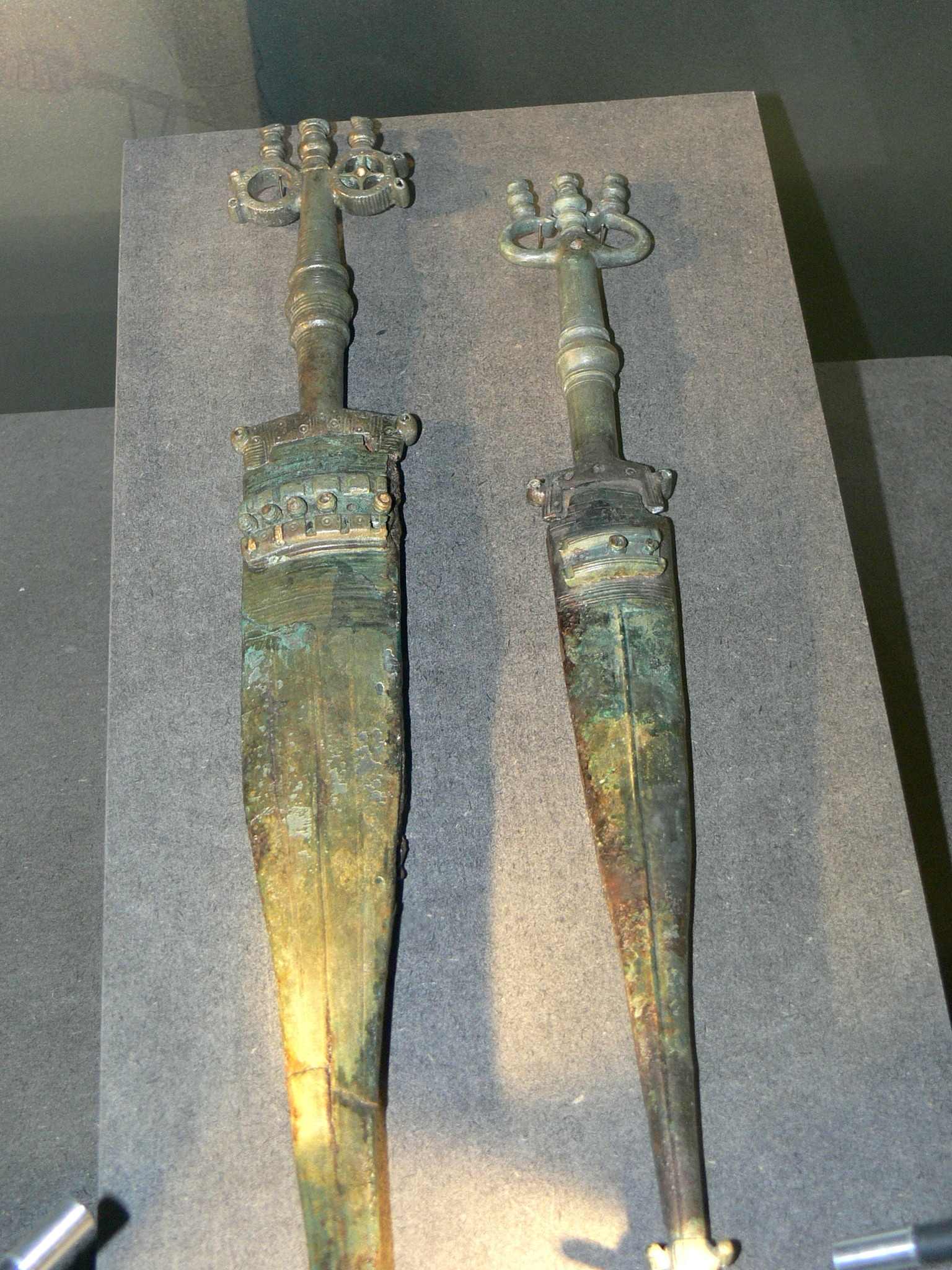
Hallstatt D 'Antenna' daggers.

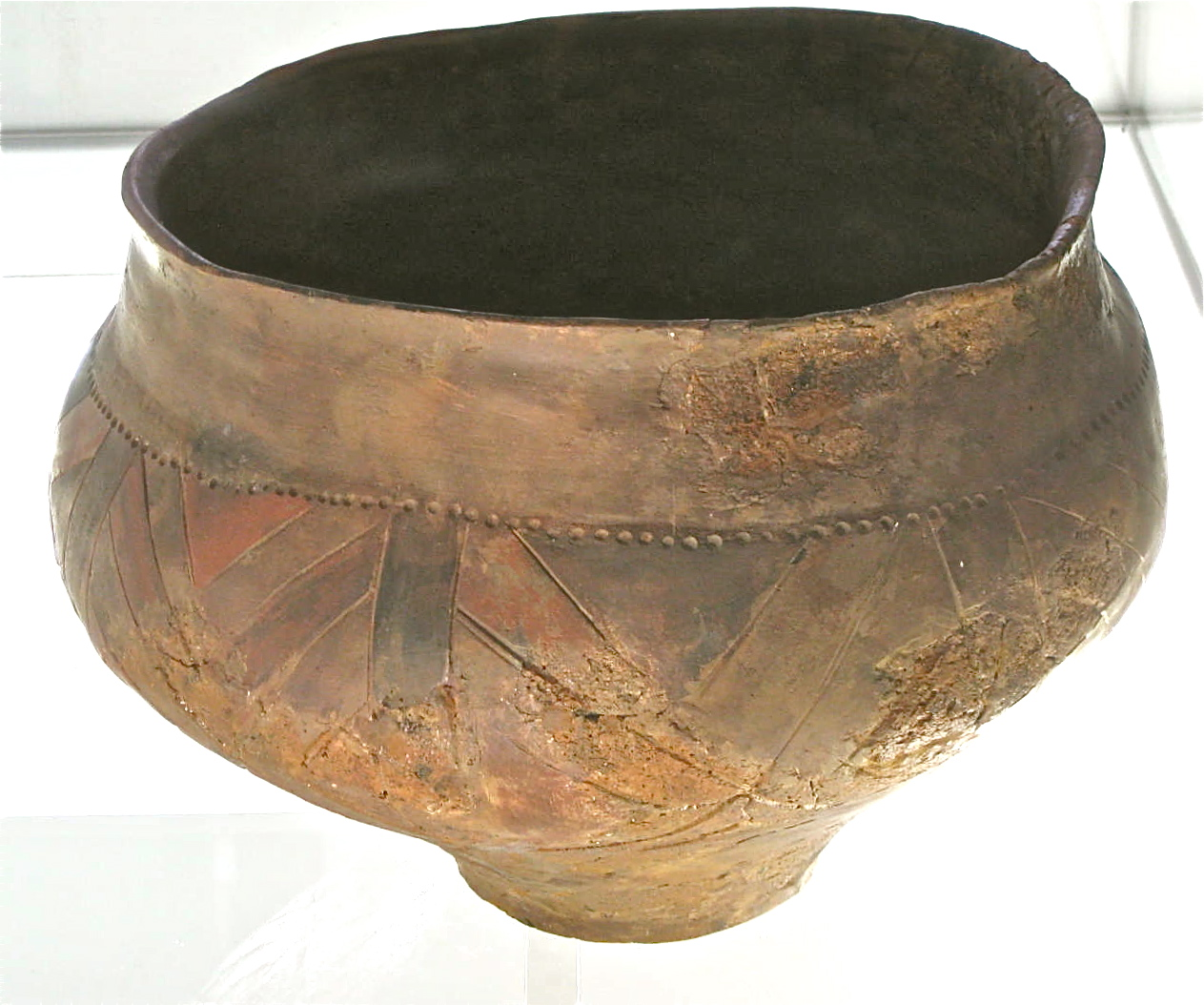
Late Hallstatt incised and painted bowl.

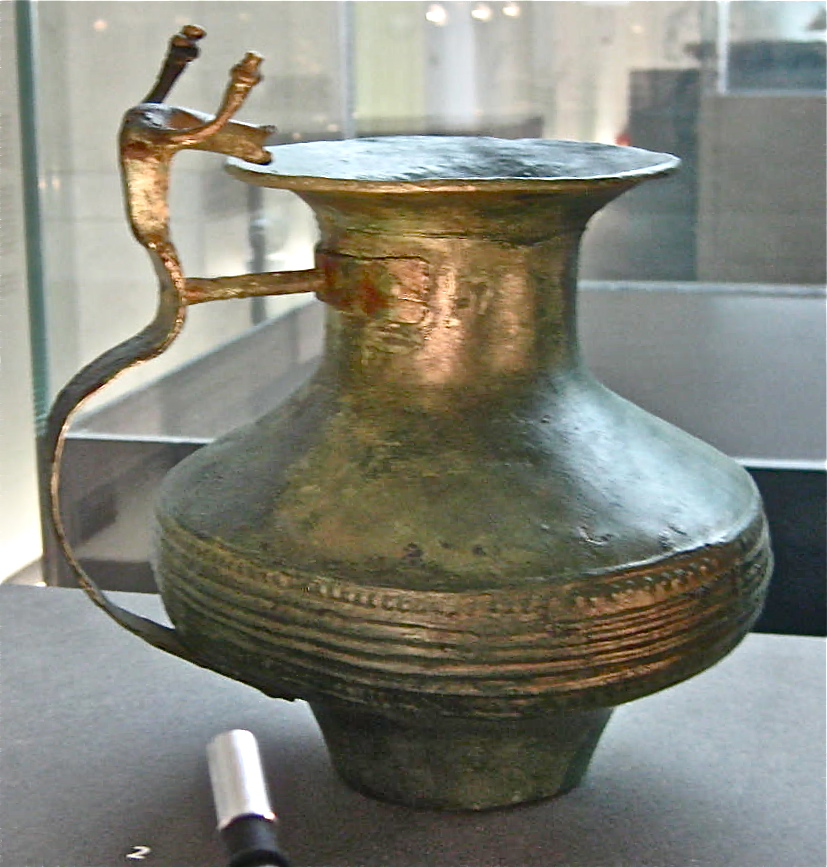
Jug with Bulls head handle. Hallein, Keltenmuseum.

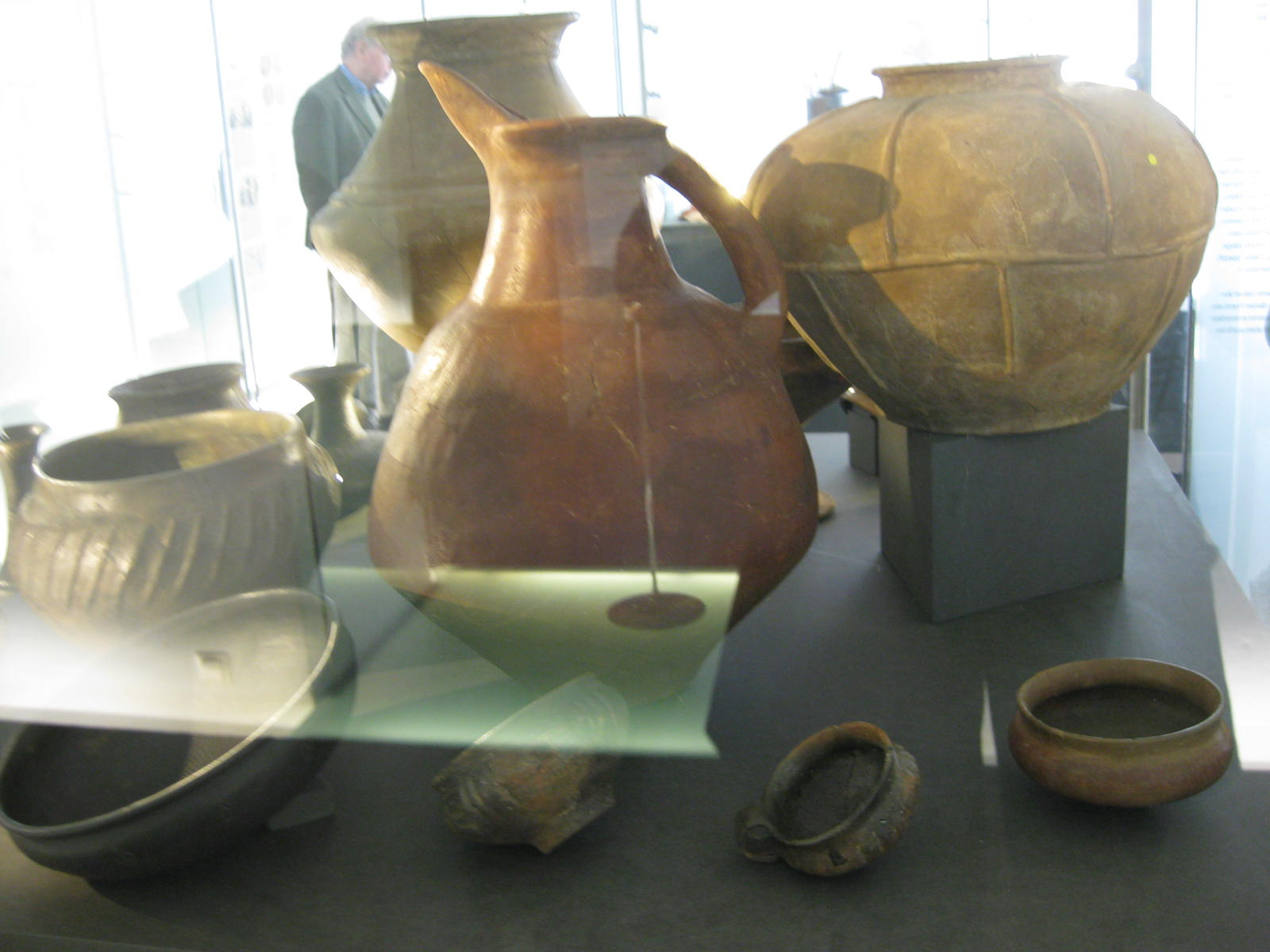
Iron Age Pottery.

== See also ==
- Celts
- Hochdorf Chieftain's Grave
- Heuneburg
- Glauberg
- Oppidum of Manching
- Oppidum
- Vix and Mont Lassois
- Hallstatt Museum

== Literature ==
- Ernst Penninger 'Geschichte der archäologischen Forschung auf dem Dürrnberg' in "Pauli" 1980 pp150–158
- Ernst Penninger 'Hallein: La Tombe 44 du Dürrnberg In Tresors des Princes Celtes Galeries nationales du grand Palais, 1987, Paris. pp 232-243
- Fritz Moosleitner 'The Dürrnberg near Hallein: A Center of Celtic Art and Culture', in V.Kruta et al. (eds)"The Celts" Thames & Hudson, London, 1991, pp167–173.
- Ernst Penninger "Der Dürrnberg bei Hallein", I, Munich 1972
- Fritz Moosleitner et al.,"Der Dürrnberg bei Hallein", II, Munich 1974
- Ludvig Pauli, "Der Dürrnberg bei Hallein", III, Munich 1978
