= Kleinaspergle =

Coordinates: 48.89739°N 9.142977°E

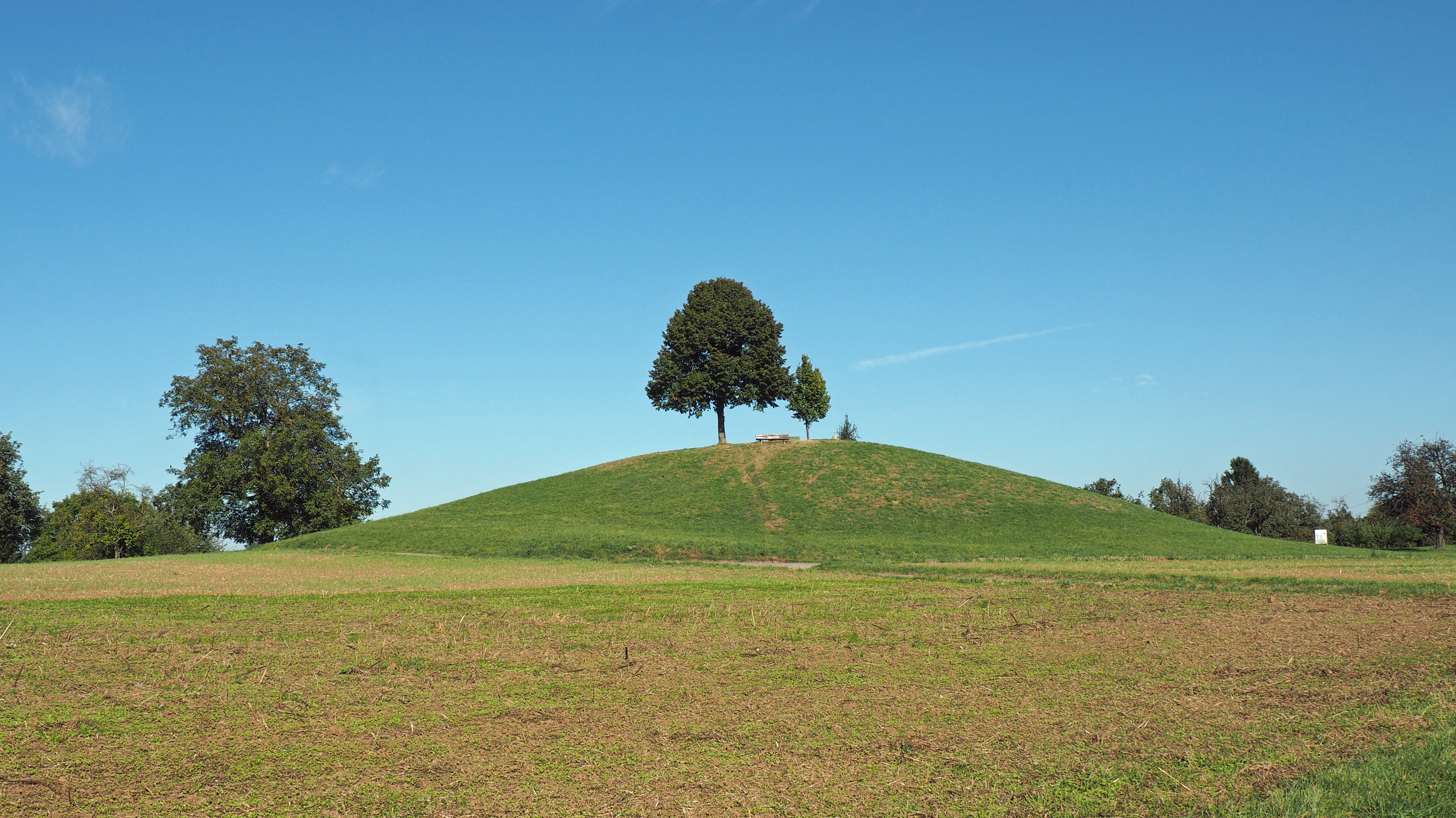
Kleinaspergle.

Kleinaspergle is an early La Tène burial mound north of Hohenasperg, in Baden-Württemberg.

In 1879, the mound was excavated by Oscar Fraas. Two burial chambers were uncovered. The main chamber had been plundered in the Middle Ages and was not able to be investigated, but the side chamber was untouched. Fraas was able to uncover several valuable artefacts from this chamber, the burial chamber of a high-status person, perhaps a woman.

The artifacts uncovered attest to the scale of cultural transfer possible in Central Europe of the period (with Etruscan and Greek artifacts represented) and, furthermore, they illustrate how Mediterranean material culture was embraced and adapted by Celtic elites and early La Tène craftsmen of the fifth/fourth century B.C.

== Excavation and identity of those buried ==
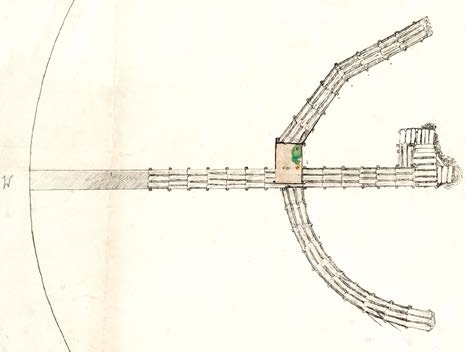
Oscar Frass's excavation of Kleinaspergle.

Kleinaspergle lies 1km north of the hillfort Hohenasperg. The burial mound is 7.5m tall and 60m in diameter. Excavations have revealed that the barrow originally had a large circular ditch around it. Several other burial mounds are in view of Hohenasperg, for example Hochdorf, though Kleinaspergle is the richest.

Kleinaspergle was excavated by Oscar Fraas in 1879. He excavated the mound by digging a tunnel into its side, tall enough to stand in. He discovered the central burial chamber, which had been plundered as recently as the 13th century. The central burial was not searched as the shaft used by the plunderers had made the chamber unstable. Luckily, in the process, an untouched side chamber was uncovered. Fraas's excavation has been described as "unsystematic" and records of this investigation kept by Oskar Fraas and his son Eberhard are not very satisfactory. It is not entirely clear how far he investigated the side chamber or where each artefact was found. As early as 1902 Paul Reinecke complained that the basic facts of the burial were "unknown". (Note: Original German: "unediert".) Fraas believed he had found the remains of a burnt body in the side chamber, but this material has not come down to us. Nonetheless, Fraas uncovered various valuable objects through his excavation which have come down to us.

Both burial chambers certainly represent the burials of elites. The gender of the person buried in the side chamber has been subject to some debate. Gender identification has been frustrated by the comparative paucity of personal ornament among the grave finds. Fraas identified the person as female, presumably on the basis of the lack of weaponry among the grave goods, which conventionally suggests a female burial. Paul Jacobsthal thought the presence of alcoholic residue in the stamnos ruled out an elite woman and Konrad Spindler felt that the drinking horns indicated a male burial. However, Wolfgang Kimmig has pointed out that this reasoning is poor. Similar drinking assemblages have been found in the Reinheim and Worms-Herrnsheim burials, both thought to be burials of women.

== Finds ==
The items uncovered in Kleinaspergle include: a bronze bowl, a bronze cordoned bucket, a bronze Etruscan stamnos, two Greek ceramic kylikes with gold additions, a beaked flagon, two golden drinking horns, iron belt-fittings, a gold plaque on an iron base, some gold foil pieces, and a lignite ring. These items are now in the collection of the Landesmuseum Württemberg.

The goods deposited in the side grave are representative of the La Tène A (450–380 BC). Individual grave goods are generally dated to the late 5th century BC; the kylikes, since their authors are known, can be dated to before 450 BC. Burial mounds associated with hillforts are generally dated earlier than this, within Hallstatt D (600-450 BC). Kimmig has dated this burial to just after the transition from late Hallstatt to early La Tène, around 430-420 BC.

The scale of cultural transfer that these items represent has been noted. The kylikes are perhaps an import from Italy. The stamnos and cordoned bucket are both of Southern European origin. The gold plaque has an inlay for coral, a Mediterranean import. The bronze flagon and gold drinking horns, though locally made, betray Etruscan influence. Dennis Harding has noted that the geographical distributions of such imported items above the Alps do not otherwise intersect, suggesting that this burial represents a society with an uncommon command of "trans-alpine communications".

The stamnos and cordoned bucket were likely used in a wine service; residue of an alcoholic drink has been found on the stamnos. The drinking equipment found in La Tène graves is often imported. Harding has suggested that such finds indicate a society in which "feasting and drinking on a sumptuous scale for at least ceremonial occasions" occurred.

=== Greek kylikes ===
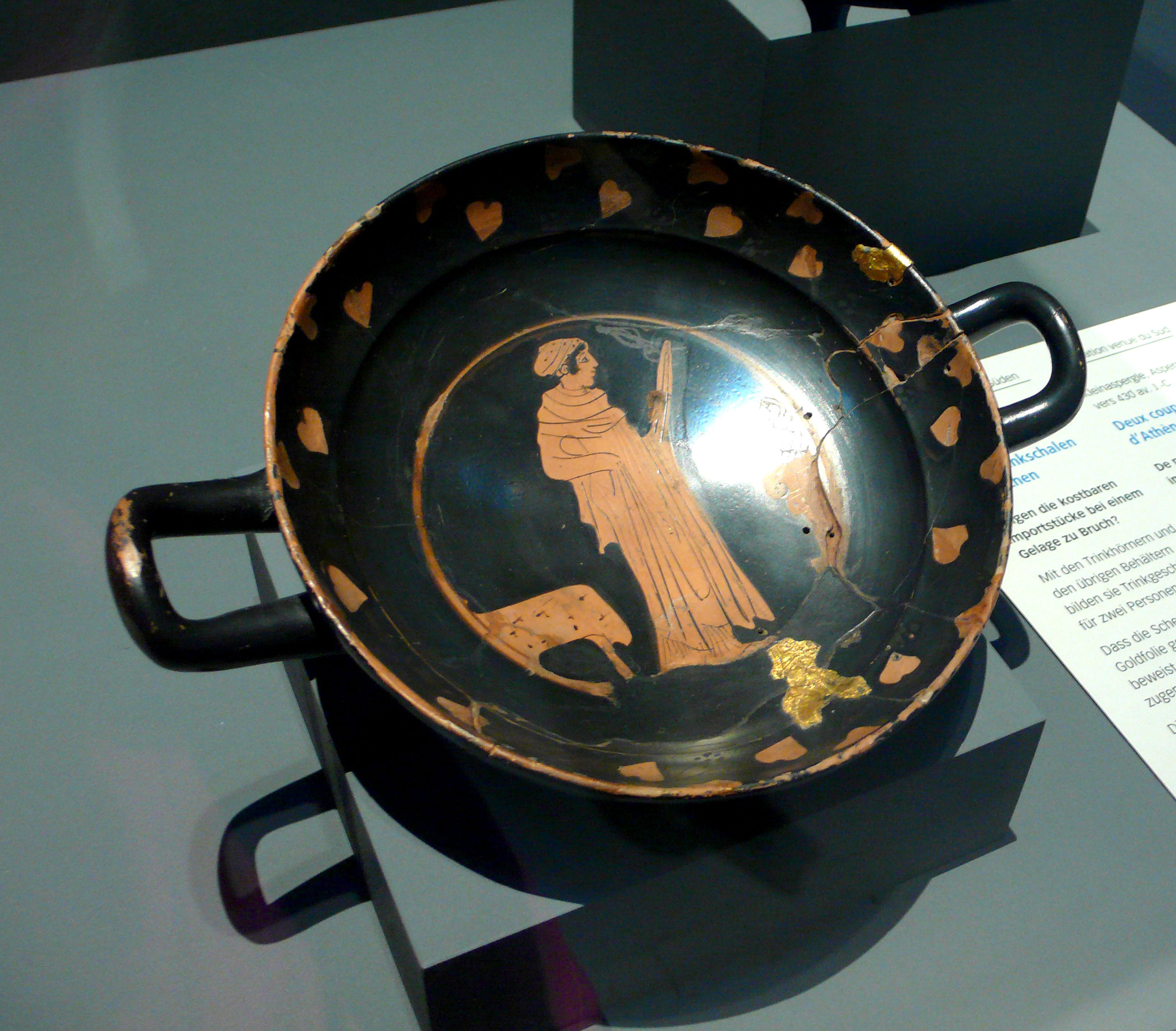
Kylix of the Amphitrite Painter

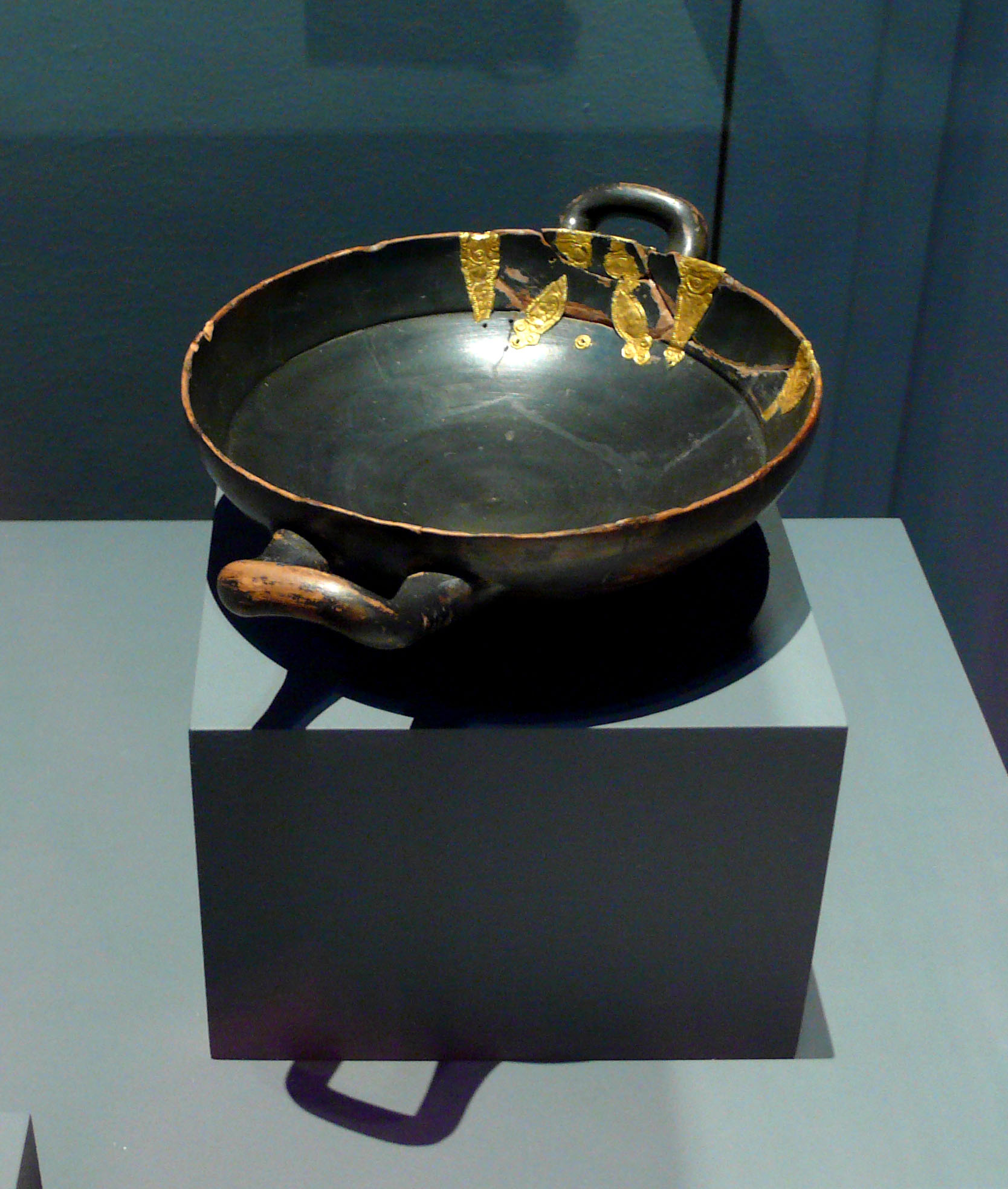
Kylix of the Sotades Painter

Two kylikes, Ancient Greek two-handled cups, were found in Kleinaspergle. One has red figures painted on it and is identifiable as the work of the Amphitrite Painter (fl. 470-460 BC). The other has a plain black glaze and is assigned to the Sotades Painter (fl. 470-450 BC). Both kylikes are damaged and were repaired using bronze clasps, covered up with patterned gold foil. Other examples of Celtic pottery repair-work survive, but such embellishment is rare on local pottery. This repair-work therefore reveals the high value which was attached to such pieces of Attic pottery. It has also been noted that this repair-work makes no attempt to replicate the motifs of the Attic painters. Instead, the repairer has chosen to incorporate La Tène design elements into the kylikes through the gold embellishments.

The kylikes, since their authors are known, set a terminus post quem for the Kleinaspergle burial. Though of no especial aesthetic value, the kylikes are vivid testaments to the scale of cultural transfer possible in the early La Tène period. The red-painted kylix was the piece of La Tène art which first captured the imagination of Paul Jacobsthal, doyen of the study of early Celtic art. (Note: Jacobsthal: "[O]ne day in the cold and hungry winter of 1921 when I was studying Greek vases in Stuttgart, I was attracted to the painted Attic cup from the Klein Aspergle chieftainly grave, not because of its beauty or its importance for the history of Greek vase-painting [...] what struck me was the fact that a Greek cup has been found in this hyperborean country, and the gold plaques of a strange style mounted on it. [...] There were two problems: trade between the Mediterranean and the North and this odd gold with seemed to reflect in a peculiar way, Greek forms." The former problem gave rise to Jacobsthal's Die Bronzeschnabelkannen (1929) and Gallia Graeca (1933); and meditation on the latter gave rise to his Early Celtic Art (1944).) The kylikes probably do not represent trade directly from Greece since other works of the Amphitrite Painter have been found in Italy, suggesting an Italic intermediary. However, these cups could also have been imported from the Greek colony of Massalia (located in modern Marseille).

=== Beaked flagon ===
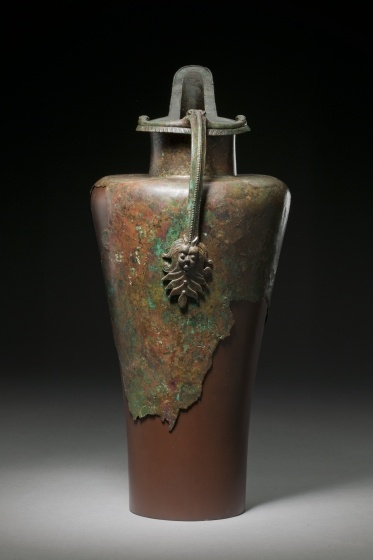
Bronze flagon from Kleinaspergle

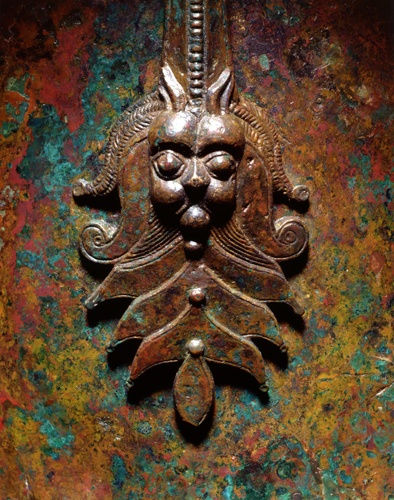
Bronze flagon detail

A fragmentary, bronze flagon was uncovered in Kleinaspergle. In its most recent reconstruction, the flagon is tall, slender, and tapering with a beaked spout. Four faces decorate the base of the handle and the rim. These faces are somewhat grotesque: with bulbous noses, bulging eyes, and puffed-out cheeks. On the rim, one demoniacal face at the head of the handle is joined by two dog-like faces on either side. At the base of the handle, a face with pointed ears and a large beard suggests an Italic satyr. This face bears a strong resemblance to the satyr-head on the Etruscan stamnos. The two S-shaped scrolls which adorn the head of the satyr-like face perhaps represent an early Celtic leaf crown.

This flagon strongly resembles the Etruscan beaked-flagons produced from the mid-6th to late-5th centuries BC, known from many Hallstatt period graves. However, the striking faces identify this as Celtic work. It seems the Celtic metalworker adapted the Etruscan design to make a flagon which would better suit expressive and face-centric Celtic tastes. Vincent Megaw has described it as "the most striking and probably the earliest surviving example of the ability of Celtic craftsmen to transmute imported forms and styles". Megaw has suggested that this flagon is among the earliest native pieces in the grave.

=== Drinking horns ===
External image
- One drinking horn on its side

A pair of gold mantles for drinking horns were uncovered at Kleinaspergle. The mantles are not identical. One is 14.5cm long while the other is 17.5cm and they bear different decorations. Both have a guilloche rope-pattern which traces their length. The larger horn has a wave-like pattern down its side. Sheep's heads are riveted onto the base of both horns, perhaps intended as a ram and an ewe.

Megaw identifies these as products of a workshop whose goldwork is also evidenced in grave finds from Schwarzenbach I and Eigenbilzen. The sheep's heads have been assumed to represent a Greco-Etruscan or even Near Eastern influence.
