= Tobelbach =

River in Germany

Location
- Country: Germany
- State: Baden-Württemberg

Physical characteristics
- Mouth
  - location: Stehenbach
  - coordinates: 48.2243°N 9.6830°E
- Length: 13.5 km (8.4 mi)

Basin features
- Progression: Stehenbach→ Danube→ Black Sea

Tobelbach is a river of Baden-Württemberg, Germany. It flows into the Stehenbach near Rottenacker.

== See also ==
- List of rivers of Baden-Württemberg
