= Hohenasperg =

Fortress and prison in Baden-Württemberg, Germany

Coordinates: 48°54′36″N 9°08′18″E

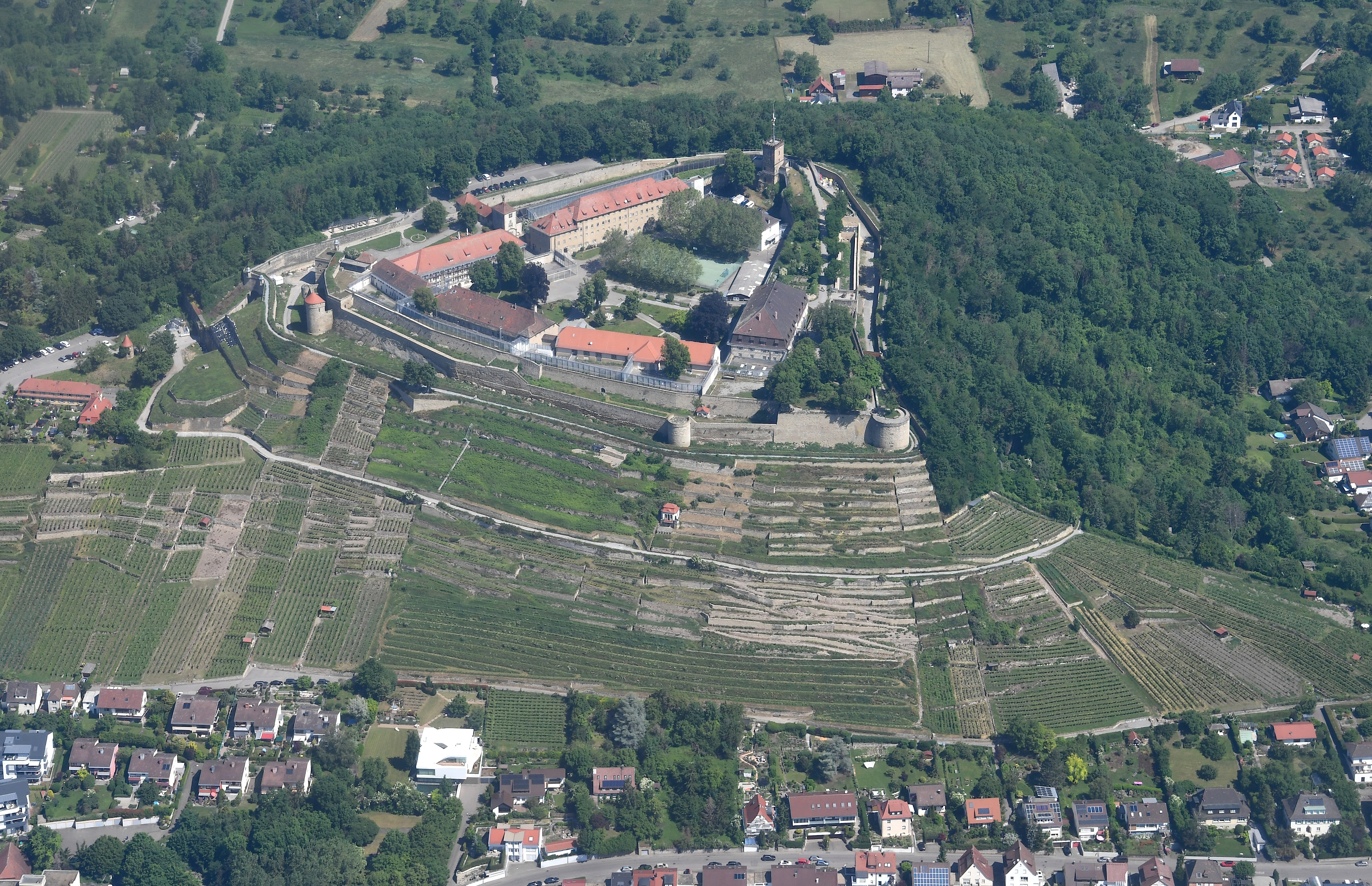
Aerial image of the Hohenasperg fortress

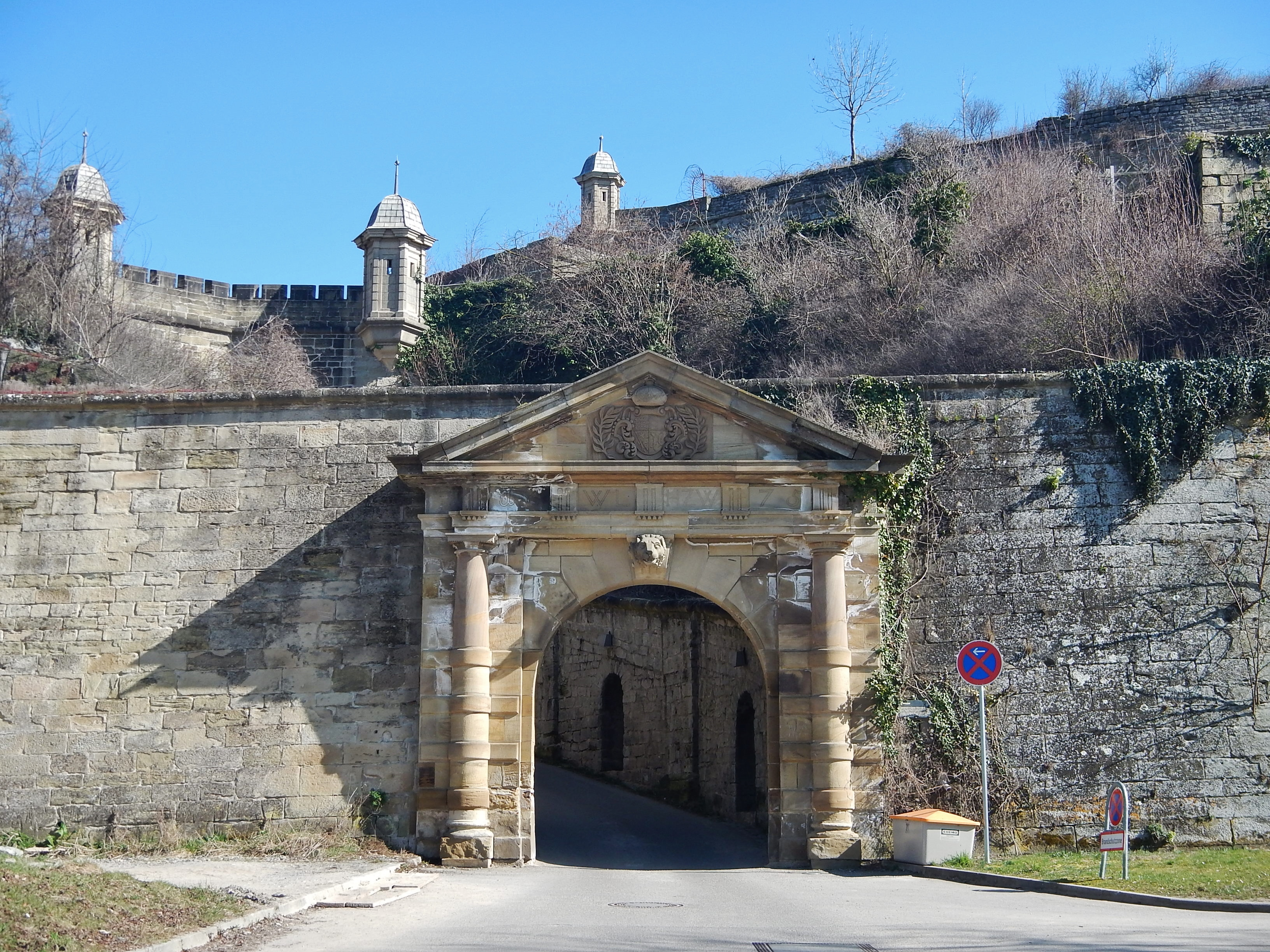
Entrance to the Hohenasperg fortress

Hohenasperg, located in the federal state of Baden-Württemberg near Stuttgart, Germany, of which it is administratively part, is an ancient fortress and prison overlooking the town of Asperg.

It was an important Celtic oppidum, and a number of very important "princely" burials are close by, in particular the Hochdorf Chieftain's Grave.

== Geography ==
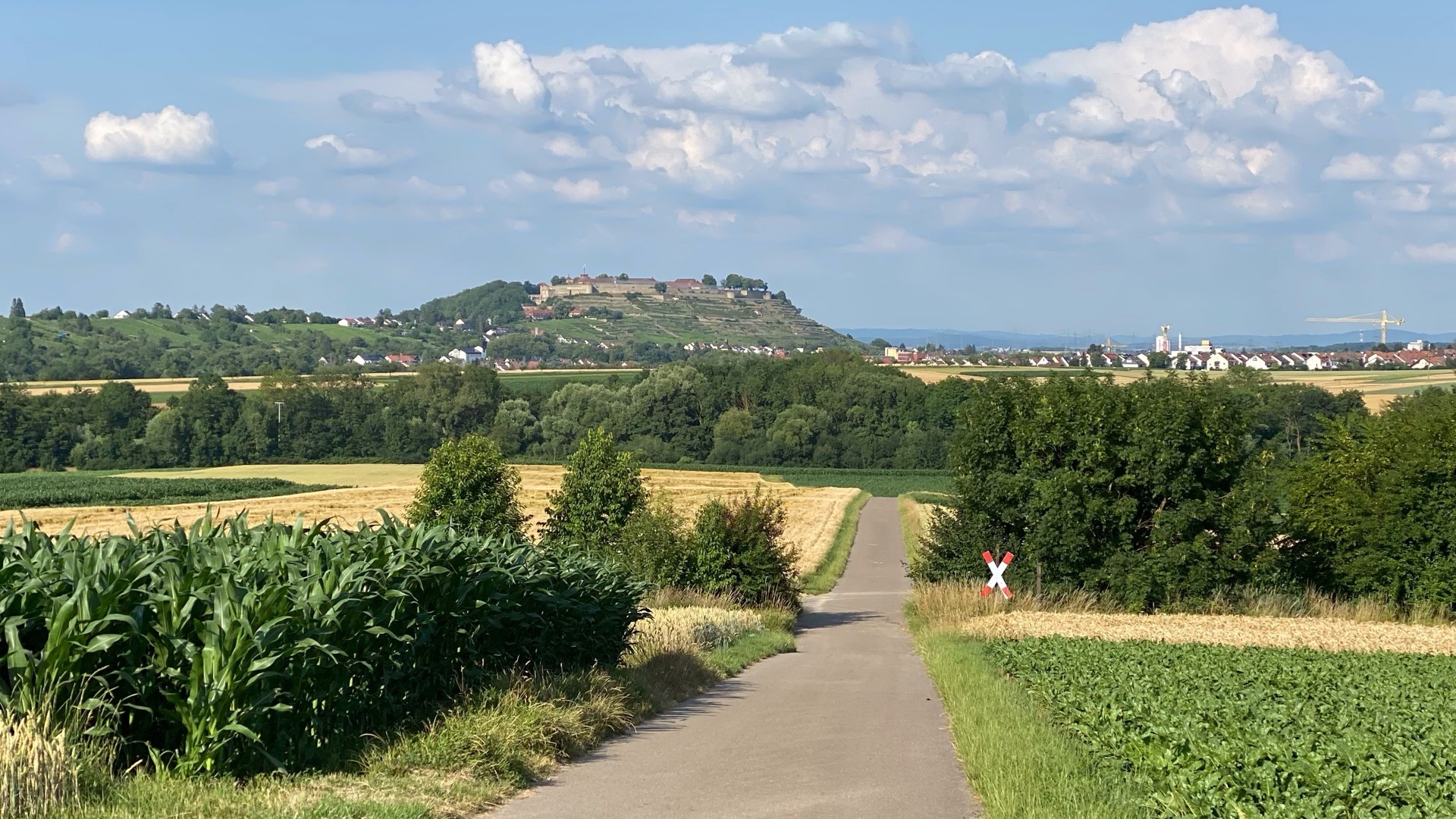
View of Hohenasperg

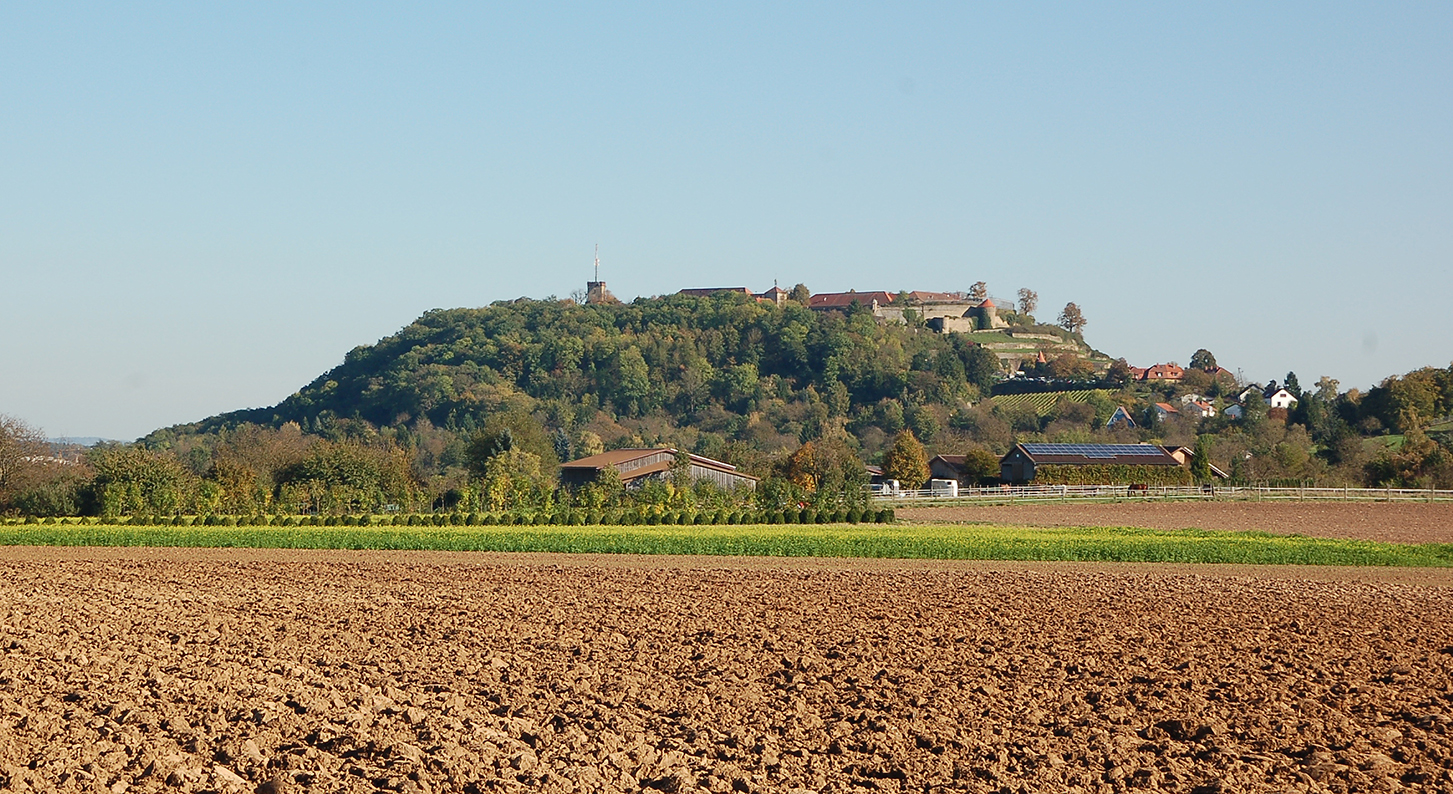
View of Hohenasperg from the northwest

Hohenasperg is located on a 90-metre-high Late Triassic hill. The hill is located in an upland area, but because of its steep overhangs and wide plateau, it is visible from a long distance and offers an ideal location for a fortification.

== History ==
=== Iron Age ===
Around 500 BC, during the Hallstatt period, the Hohenasperg was a Celtic principality with a fortified settlement, known as a 'princely seat'. Numerous Celtic burial sites in the surrounding area are aligned so as to offer a line of sight to the Hohenasperg, e.g. the large Hochdorf Chieftain's Grave, the Ludwigsburg-Römerhügel grave, and the Grafenbühl grave on the Katharinenlinde by Schwieberdingen. Kleinaspergle, which has been well-known since an excavation in 1839, is a burial mound lying 1,000 metres south of Hohenasperg, which offers an exceptionally good view of the Hohenasperg.

==== Iron Age finds ====
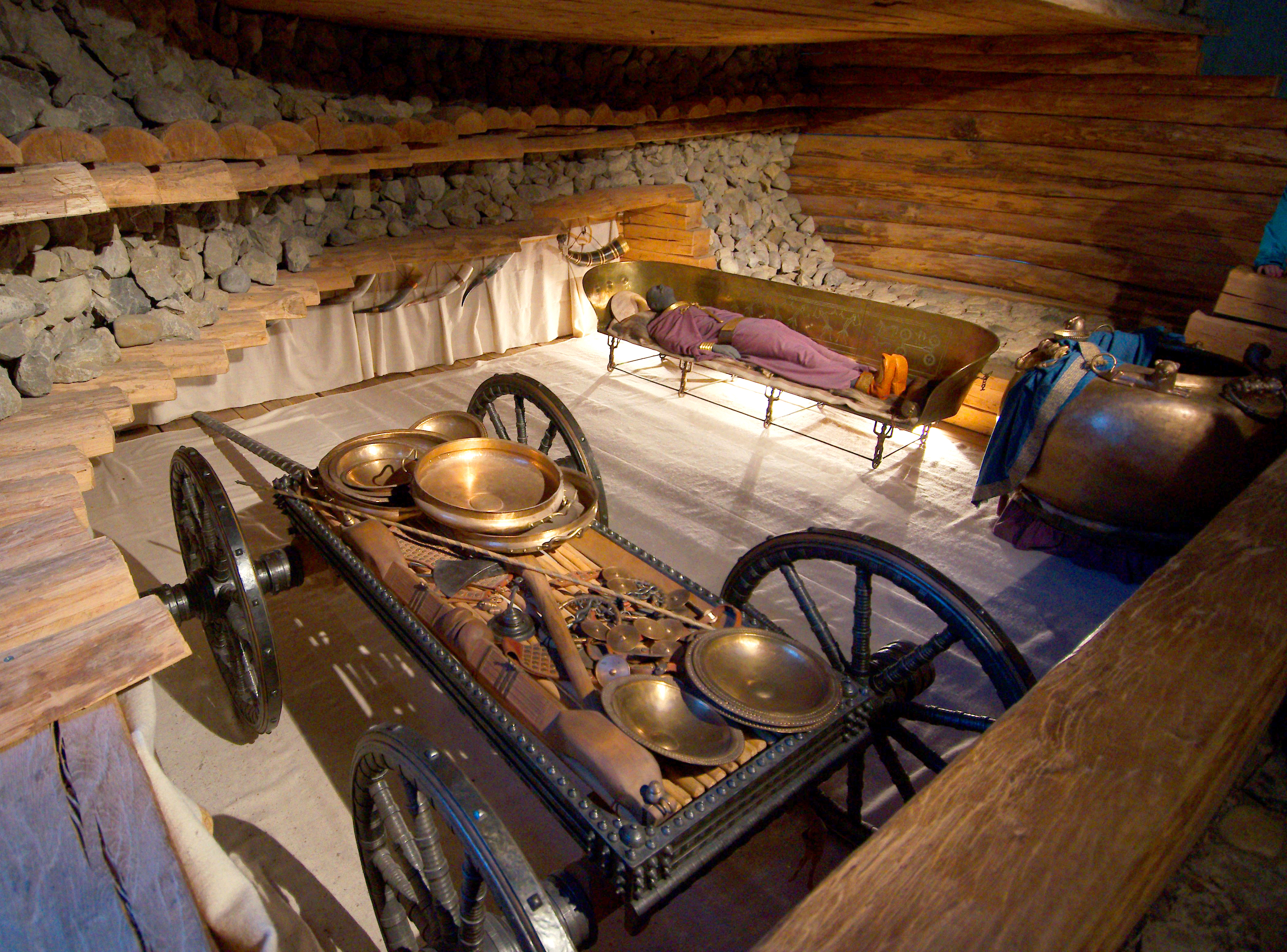
The Hochdorf Chieftain's Grave

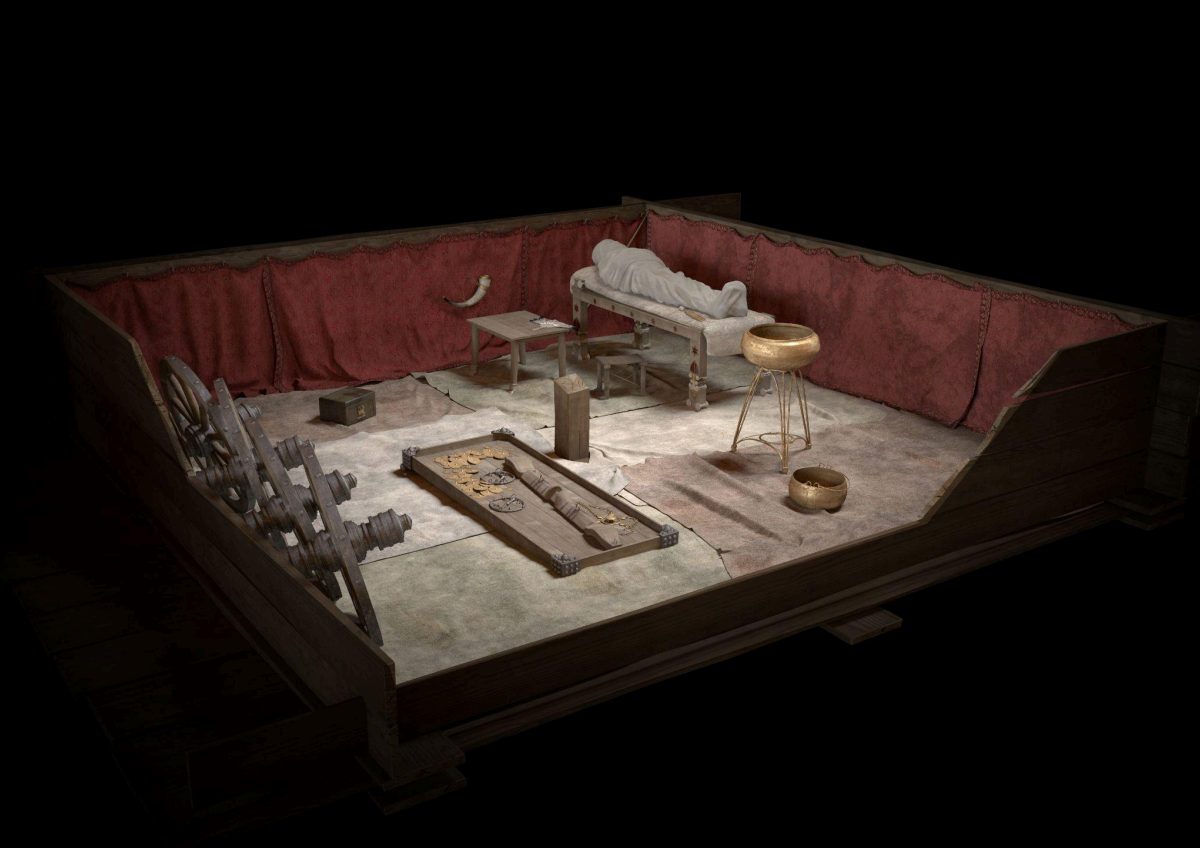
The Grafenbühl grave

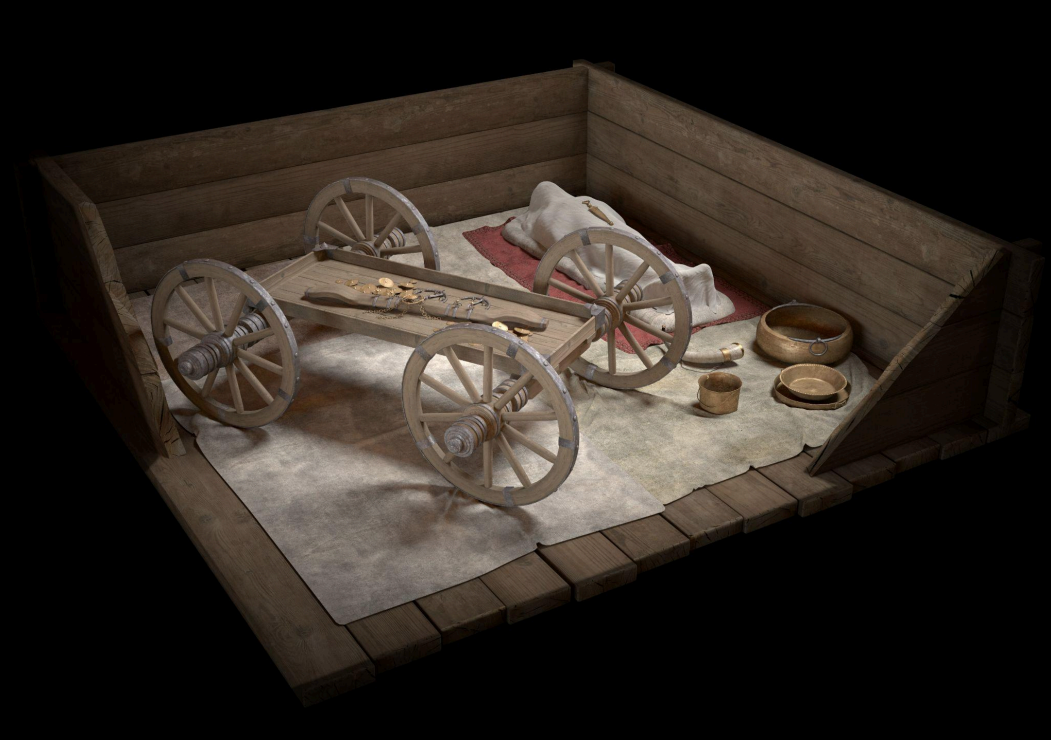
The Ludwigsburg-Römerhügel grave

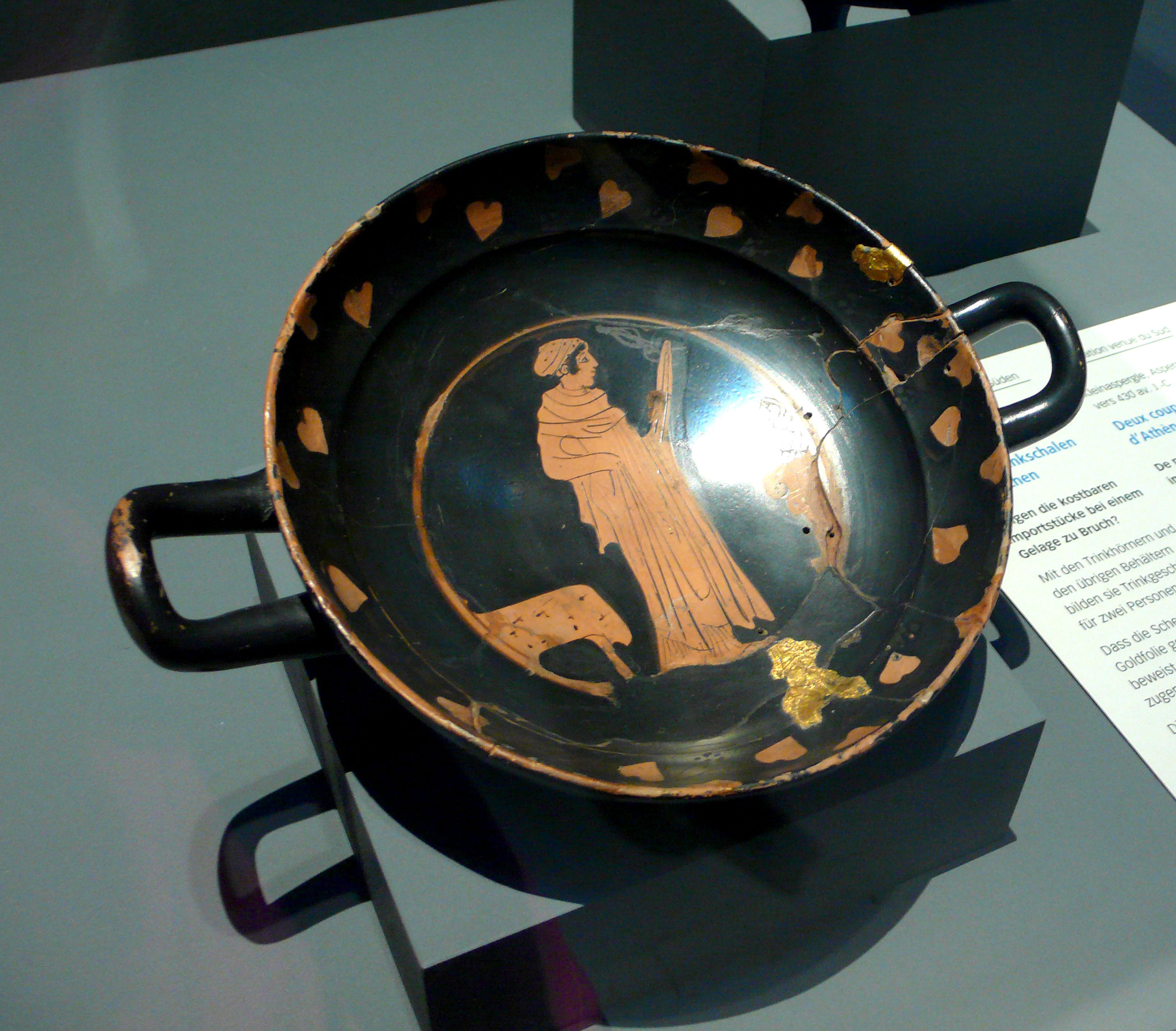
Greek pottery from the Kleinaspergle burial mound

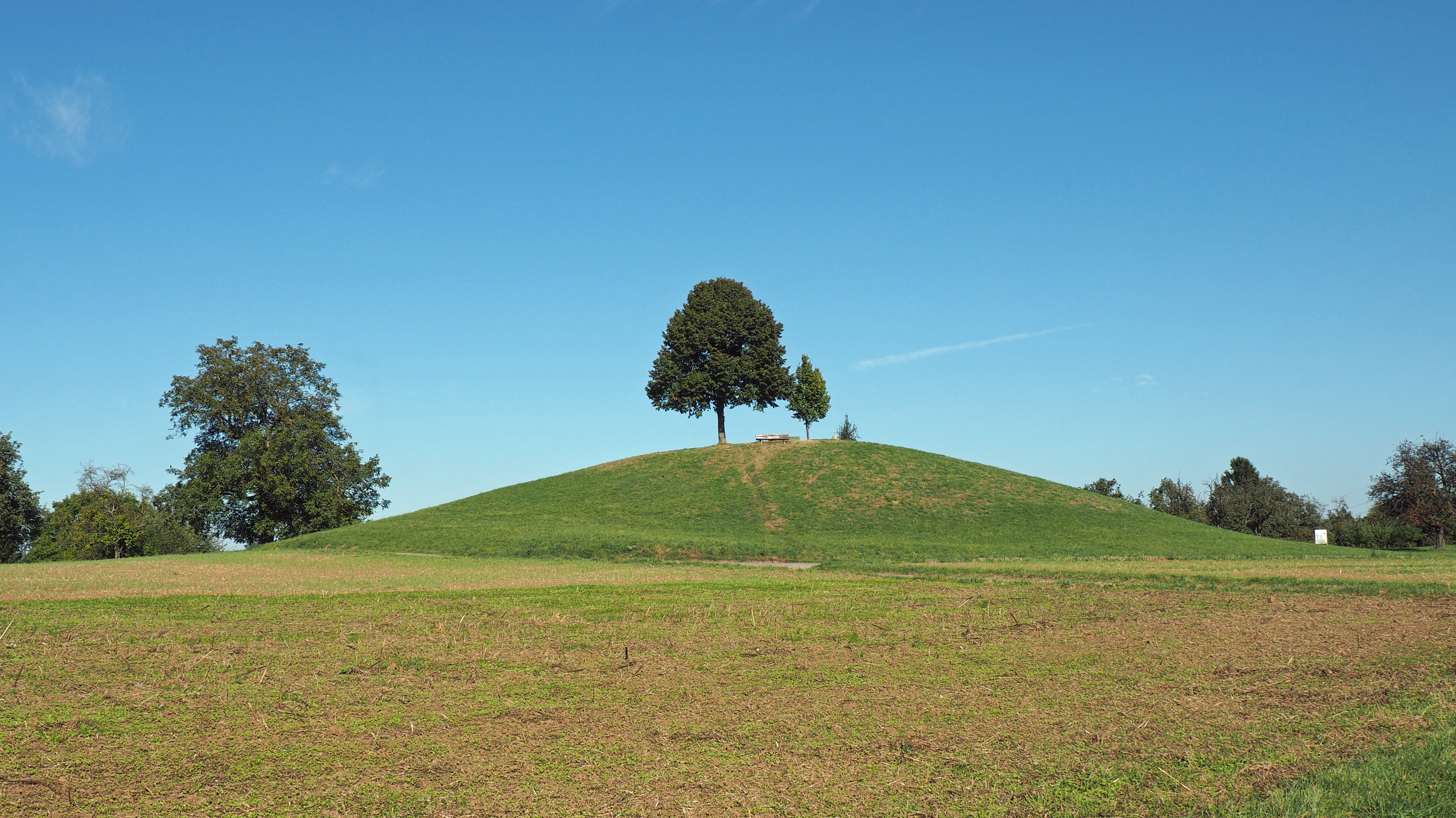
The Kleinaspergle burial mound

=== Middle Ages ===
Around 500 AD, after the victory of the Franks over the Alamanni, Hohenasperg became the seat of the Frankish Lord and Frankish Thing, the legislative assembly. At this time Hohenasperg was called "Ascicberg."

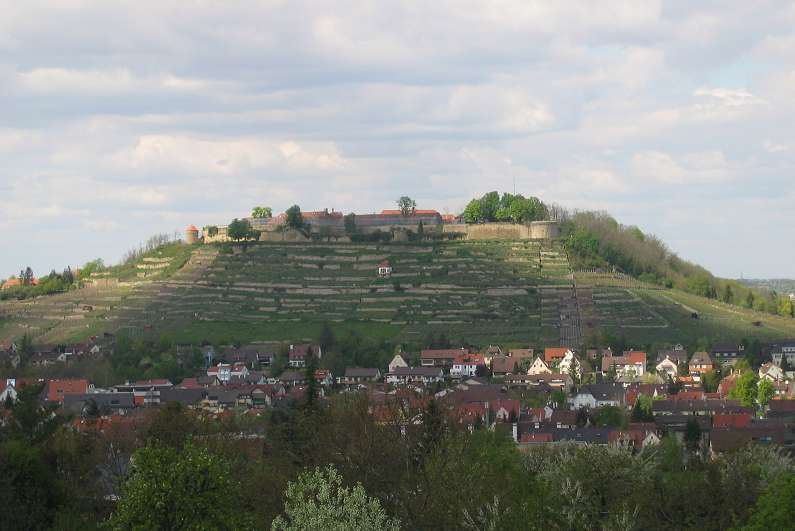
View of Hohenasperg from the Kleinaspergle tumulus

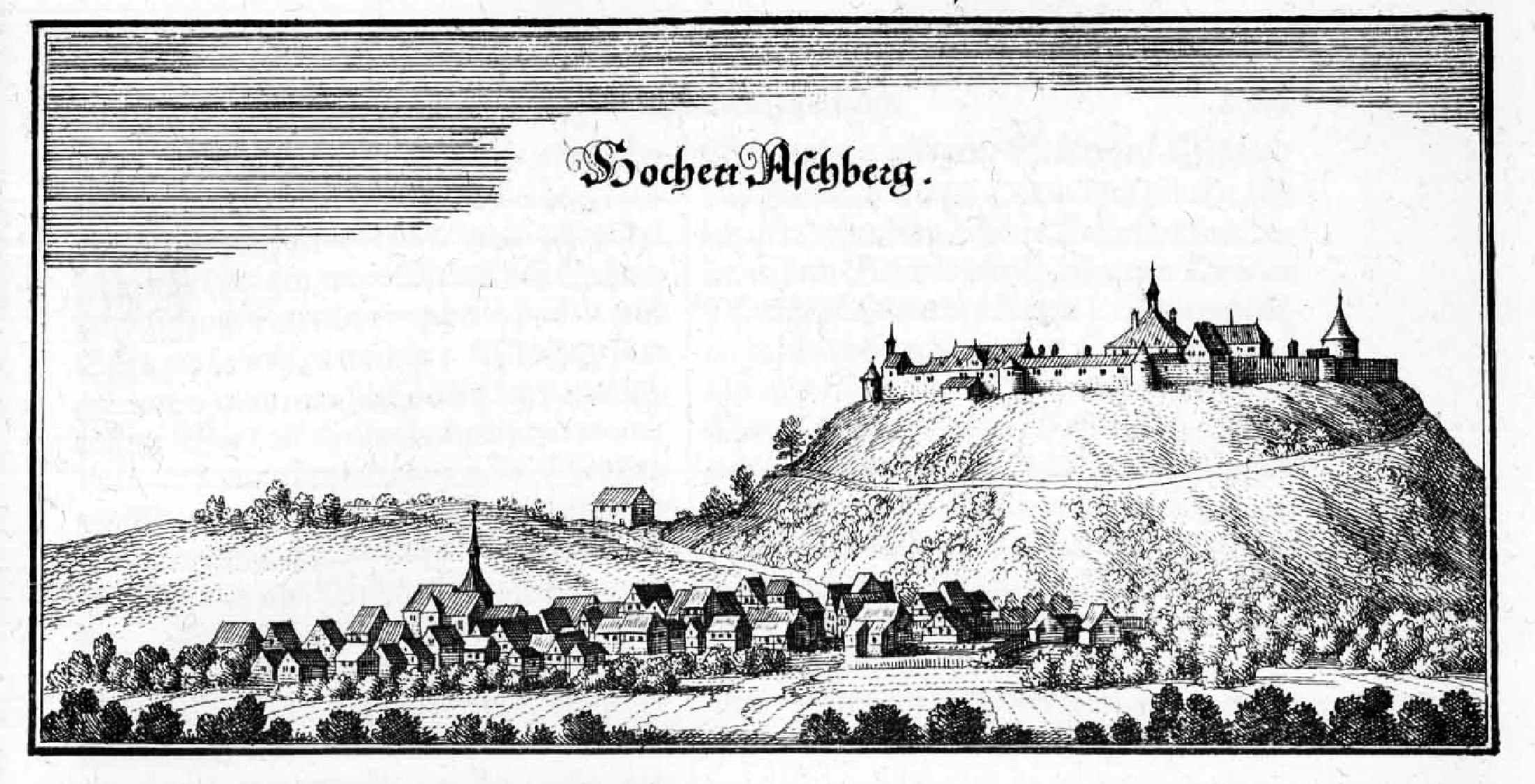
Illustration of Hohenasperg, 1643

The first time Asperg was referred to was in the year 819, as the Shire Gozberg granted local suzerainty to Weissenburg Abbey in the Alsace. The location however achieved more importance in the 13th century with the founding of the independent town of Hohenasperg, which lasted until 1909.

=== Early Modern period ===
Hohenasperg was officially chartered in 1510. In 1519, forces of the Swabian League under George von Frundsberg laid siege to Hohenasperg where Duke Ulrich of Württemberg was holding out.

On 12 May 1525, the peasant leader, Jäcklein Rohrbach, was taken prisoner by the governor of Asperg. He was held there until the surrender of the Steward of Waldburg-Zeil. After 1535, the castle was expanded and turned into a fortress. The residents were resettled at the foot of the hill.

Between 1634 and 1635, during the Thirty Years War, the castle was defended against imperial troops by a garrison of Protestants from Württemberg, reinforced by Swedish forces. The siege ended finally with the surrender to the imperial troops, who occupied the fortress until 1649.

After the Thirty Years War, the fortress was returned to the rule of Württemberg. In 1688 and 1693, it was occupied by French troops; afterwards it lost its importance as a defensive fortress and became a garrison and a state prison. In 1718, Asperg was integrated into the district Ludwigsburg, but 17 years later became its own district. In 1781, Asperg was permanently incorporated into the district of Ludwigsburg.

== Prisoners ==
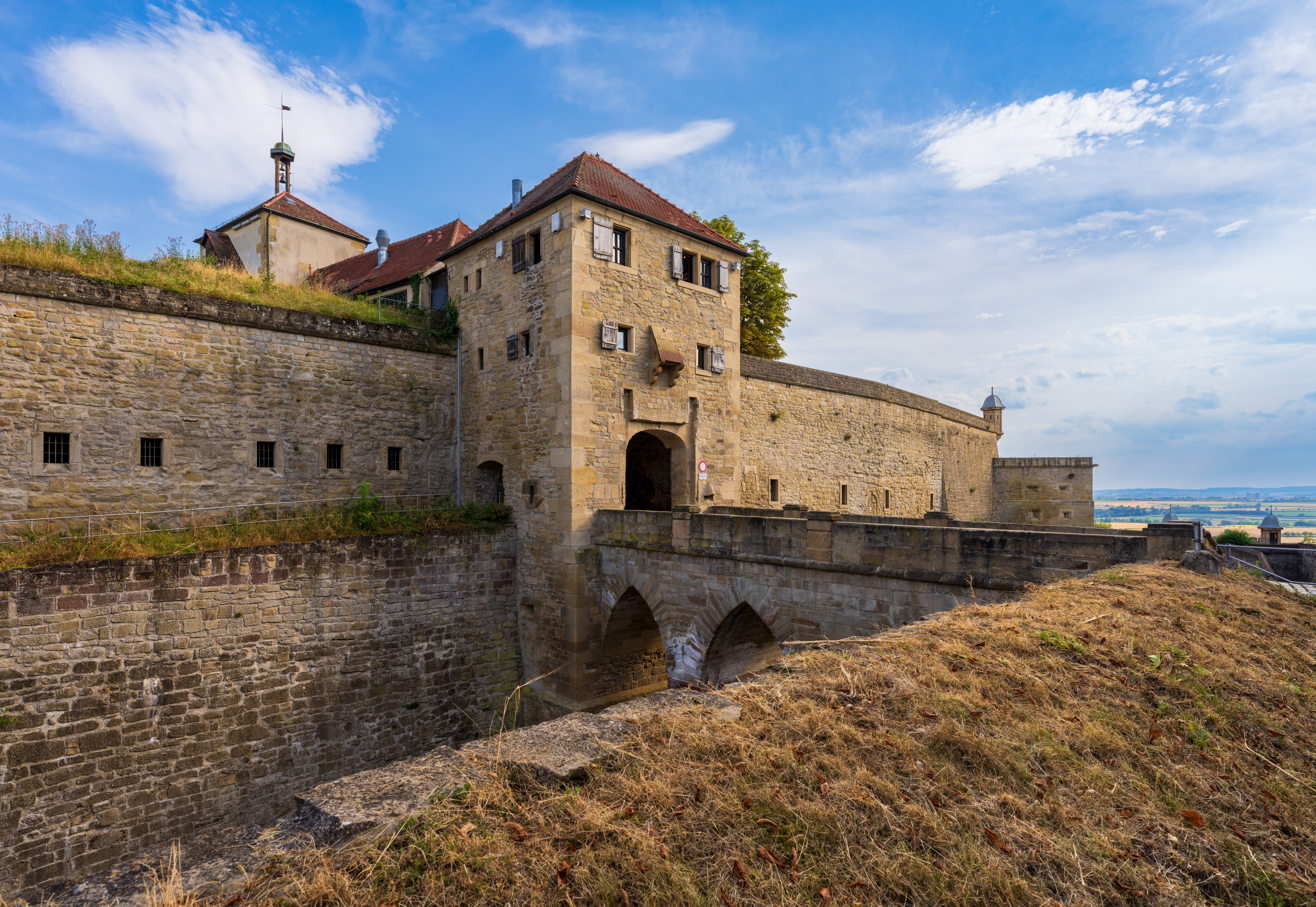
Hohenasperg Fortress

The use of the fortress as a prison is responsible for the fact that Hohenasperg is jokingly referred to as "Württemberg's highest mountain" as they say "it takes only five minutes to come to the top, but years to come back down again."

=== Holy Roman Empire ===
In 1737, Joseph Süß Oppenheimer, a Jew and the financial adviser to the Duke of Württemberg, was arrested and held at Hohenasperg for seven months before being executed in Stuttgart. The poet C. F. D. Schubart was held prisoner there between 1777 and 1787; Friedrich Schiller was mindful of Schubart's fate when he wrote his play "The Robbers," inspired by one of Schubart's short stories. Schiller himself escaped imprisonment in the Hohenasperg by fleeing to Mannheim in the neighboring Electorate of the Palatinate.

=== 19th century ===
During the rule of King Frederick of Württemberg, deserters, military prisoners, and separatists from the Radical Pietist group from the circle of Rottenacker were kept at Fort Hohenasperg. By 1813, about 400 prisoners were arrested on the fortress. When his son King William I of Württemberg became ruler in 1817, corporal punishment, such as running the gauntlet, was abolished.

Further inmates in Fort Hohenasperg included the writer Berthold Auerbach, who was kept here between 1837 and 1838; Friedrich Kammerer (1833); the doctor and poet Theobald Kerner (1850–1851); the theologian Karl Hase; the satirist Johannes Nefflen; the poet Leo von Seckendorff, the writer Theodor Griesinger; and many more, mostly political dissidents, who in general were held prisoner because of their anti-monarchistic views.

In 1887 and 1888 a water tower, was constructed, which also supports police radio antennas.

Since 1894, a prison for the civil penal system has been located on Hohenasperg hill. In the meantime the central hospital for the Baden-Württemberg penal system was placed on the Hohenasperg.

=== Early years of the Nazi era ===
During spring and summer 1933, numerous members of Hitler's opposition, the Social Democrats and Communists, were imprisoned at Hohenasperg. Amongst these prisoners was the Governor of Württemberg, Eugen Bolz, who was murdered during Aktion Gitter in Berlin in 1945. At least 101 prisoners died in Hohenasperg under its hard penal system, and 20 of their names have been identified by the Ludwigsburg VVN, an antifascist organization. These names are remembered on a plaque in the Prisoner's Cemetery.

=== Transit camp for deportation to concentration camps (1940–1943) ===
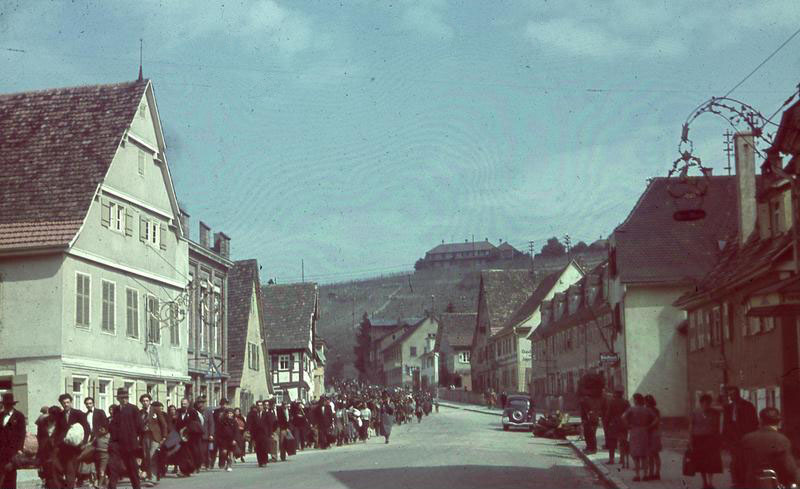
Sinti were escorted by foot through the village under police surveillance.

In May 1940, the prison was used as a way station during the first centrally planned deportation of Sinti out of southwest Germany, west of the Rhine River (Mainz, Ingelheim, Worms). The deportation was carried using a special train, families were escorted through the village by foot, with police surveillance. In the prison, examinations were conducted by the Ritter Research Institute, which decided the fate of the inmates. The institute was named for the scientific racist Robert Ritter. Further deportations were sent to the General Government, the area of Germany-occupied Poland. Non-gypsies were sent back.

At least until the beginning of 1943, the prison was used as a way station for Sinti who were being sent to concentration camps. Later deportations led to the Gypsy Family Camp, the concentration camp of Auschwitz-Birkenau, where prisoners were murdered.

=== Post-war period ===
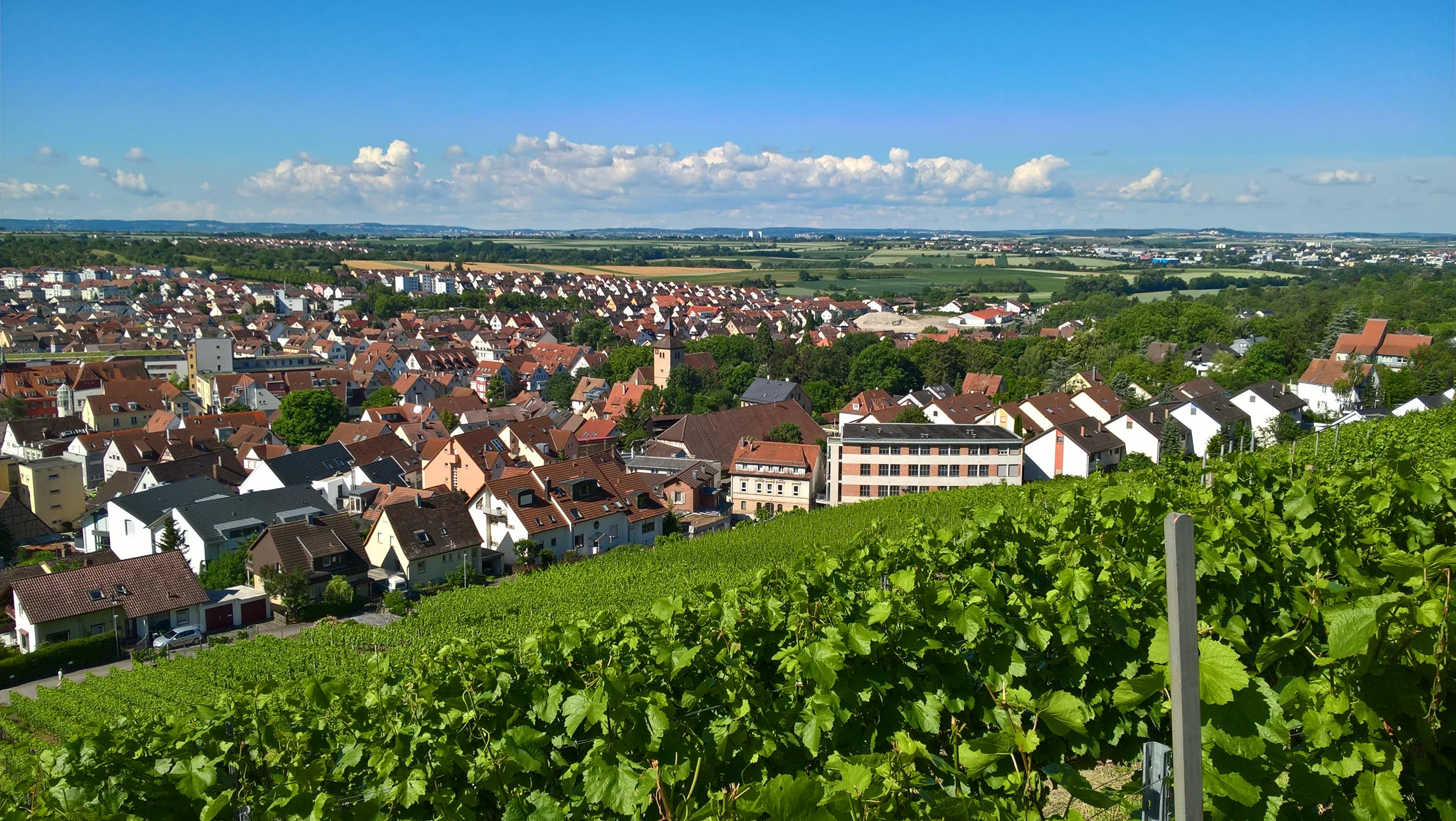
View of Asperg from Hohenasperg

The U.S. Seventh Army used Hohenasperg as an Internment camp 1946-1947. In the book, "The Prison Called Hohenasperg", American born and raised author Arthur D. Jacobs provides his experience as a twelve- and thirteen-year-old prisoner in Hohenasperg.

In June 1959 Karl Jäger, a former Einsatzgruppen officer, hanged himself in Hohenasperg prison.

=== Today ===
The prison later became a civil prison for the detention of non-political prisoners and now also houses the central hospital of the prison service in Baden-Württemberg. The serial killer Heinrich Pommerenke died in Hohenasperg in the central hospital on 27 December 2008.

There is a small museum detailing the lives of some of the prison's notable inmates ("Hohenasperg. Ein deutsches Gefängnis").
