= Reutibach =

Location
- Country: Germany
- State: Baden-Württemberg

Physical characteristics
- Mouth
  - location: Stehenbach
  - coordinates: 48.1981°N 9.6901°E
- Length: 13.2 km (8.2 mi)

Basin features
- Progression: Stehenbach→ Danube→ Black Sea

Map of Germany

Reutibach is a river of Baden-Württemberg, Germany. It flows into the Stehenbach in Unterstadion. Reutibach has an elevation of 506 metres. Reutibach is situated nearby to Unterstadion, close to Weiherbach.

== See also ==
- List of rivers of Baden-Württemberg
- List of rivers in Germany
