= Beak-spouted ewer =

Form of pitcher with a long spout

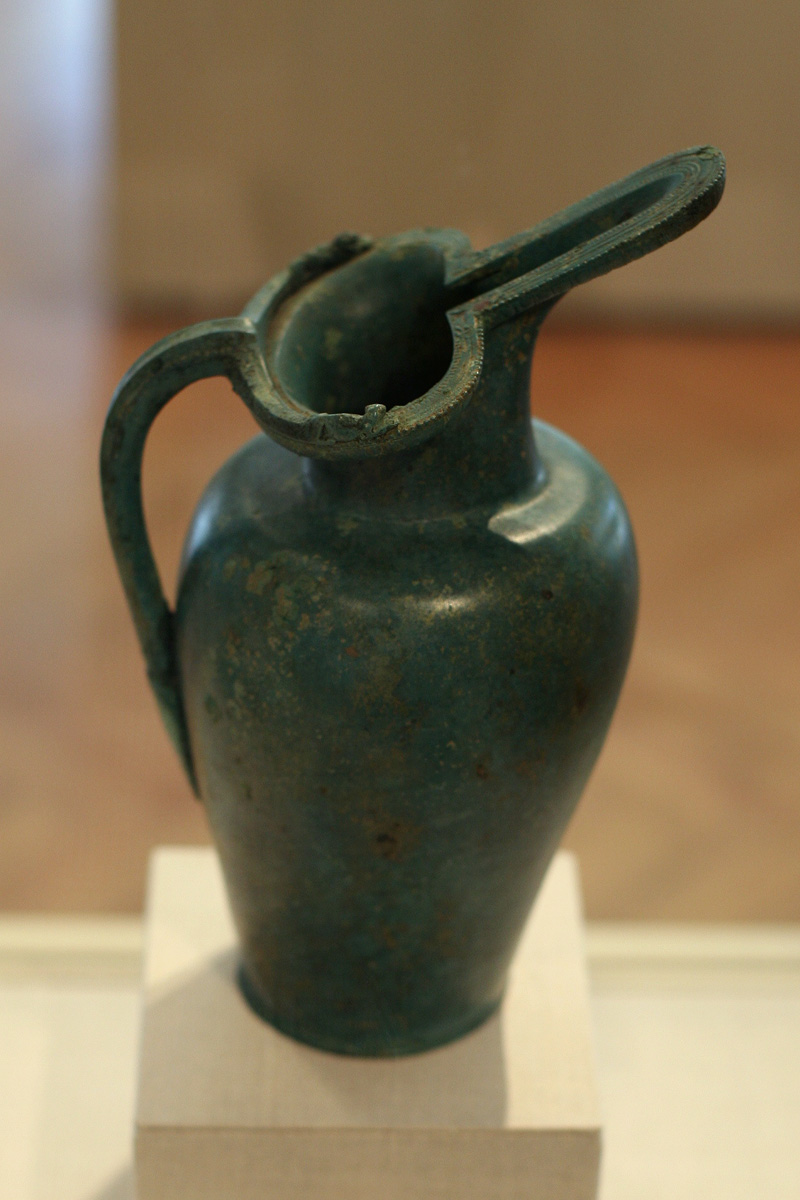
Etruscan Schnabelkanne

A beak-spouted ewer (German: Schnabelkanne) is a ewer, jug, pitcher or flagon with a spout formed in the shape of a beak.

Beak-spouted ewers were initially made and used by the Etrurians. The Celts imported some of these vessels and started to copy them. They developed variants according to their liking. The containers were either made from bronze or from clay.

Famous Celtic beak-spouted ewers have been found at the Glauberg in Hessia, at Kleinaspergle in Baden-Württemberg, and the Dürrnberg near Hallein in Austria. A modern variant was made by the Workshop of Christian Knütgen (active 1568–1605) in Siegburg (Germany), 1597 and is now kept at The Metropolitan Museum of Art.
