= Hochdorf Chieftain's Grave =

Celtic burial chamber and museum in Germany

Coordinates: 48°53′21″N 9°00′12″E

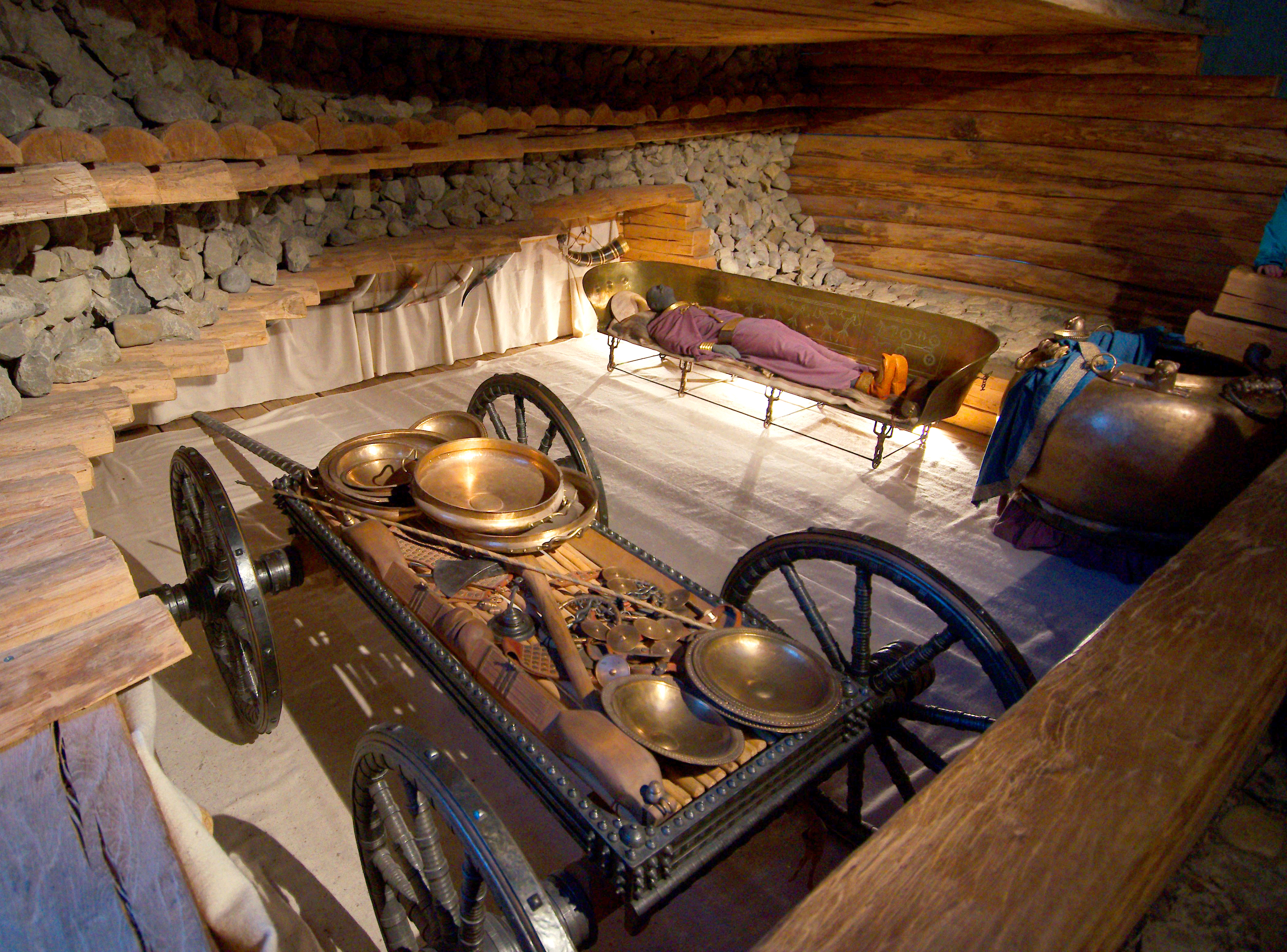
Hochdorf Chieftain's Grave reconstruction

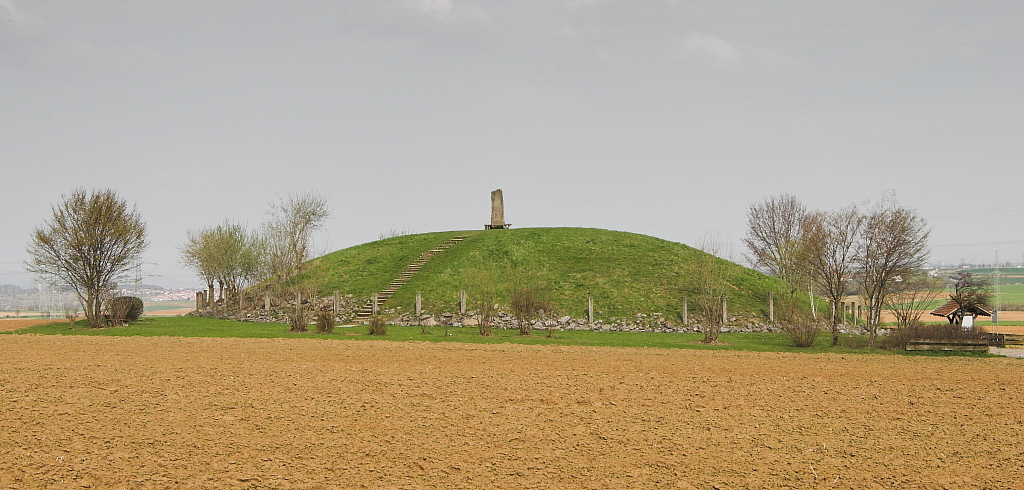
Hochdorf burial mound

The Hochdorf Chieftain's Grave is a richly-furnished Celtic burial chamber near Hochdorf an der Enz (municipality of Eberdingen) in Baden-Württemberg, Germany, dating from 530 BC in the Hallstatt culture period. It was discovered in 1968 by an amateur archaeologist and excavated from 1978 to 1979 by the State Historical site office known as the Baden-Württemberg Landesdenkmalamt under the direction of German archeologist Jörg Biel with association from excavation technician Fritz Maurer. By then, the burial mound covering the grave, originally 6 m (20 ft) in height and about 60 m (200 ft) in diameter, had shrunk to about 1 m (3 ft 3 in) in height and was hardly discernible due to centuries of erosion and agricultural use.

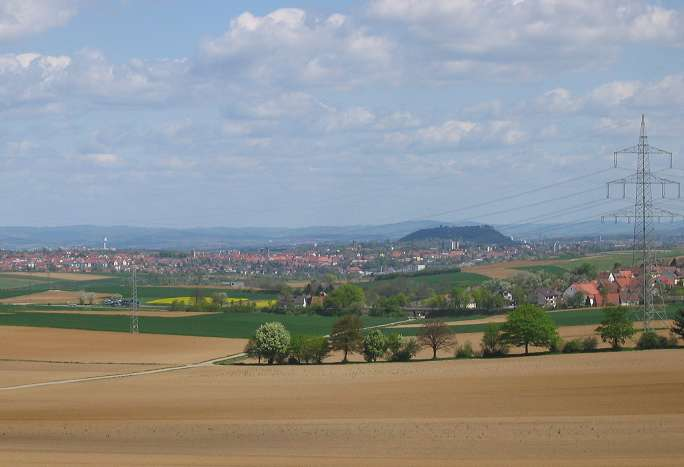
View of the Hohenasperg from the Hochdorf burial mound

A man, roughly 50 years of age and 180 cm (71 in) tall, was laid out on an exceptionally richly decorated 275 cm (108 in) bronze recliner with eight wheels inside the burial chamber. Judging by other objects found there, this man probably had been a Celtic chieftain: He had been buried with a gold-plated torc on his neck, a bracelet on his right arm, a hat made of birch bark, a gold-plated dagger made of bronze and iron, rich clothing, amber jewelry, a razor knife, a nail clipper, a comb, fishing hooks, arrows, and most notably, thin embossed gold plaques which were on his now-disintegrated shoes. At the foot of the couch was a large cauldron decorated with three lions around the brim, originally imported from Magna Graecia but subsequently altered. This cauldron was originally filled with about 400 L (88 imp gal; 110 US gal) of mead. Hemp or cannabis was also found in the Hochdorf grave. The east side of the tomb contained an iron-plated wooden four-wheeled wagon holding a set of bronze dishes—along with the drinking horns found on the walls enough to serve nine people. The whole burial chamber was lined with elaborate textiles.

Krausse (1999) has argued that the material in the Hochdorf burial may denote the combined position of a chief and a priest, or Sakralkönig (sacral king).

According to Gaspani (1998) the diagonals of the rectangular burial chamber were aligned with the major lunar standstill, which occurs every 18.6 years.

The Hochdorf grave is located within sight of the Hallstatt-era fortified settlement and 'princely seat' of the Hohenasperg, which is surrounded by other elite burials such as the Grafenbühl grave and the Kleinaspergle.

Following the excavations of the grave the burial mound was reconstructed to its original height. The Keltenmuseum Hochdorf was subsequently built nearby and opened in 1991. During the construction of the museum the foundations of an ancient Celtic village were found, possibly the one to which the chieftain belonged. These were incorporated into the museum.

== Gallery ==
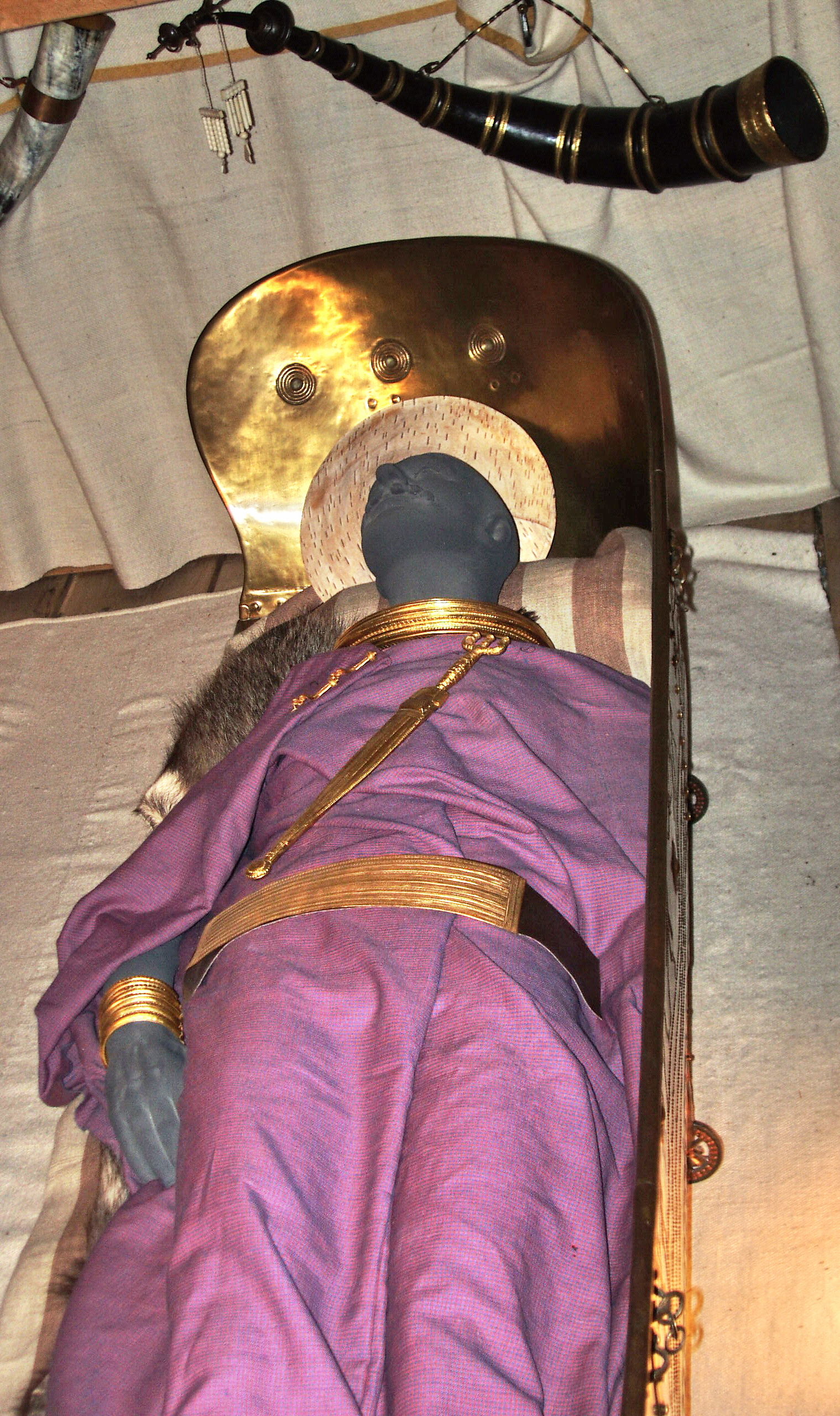
Reconstruction with gold ornaments and dagger

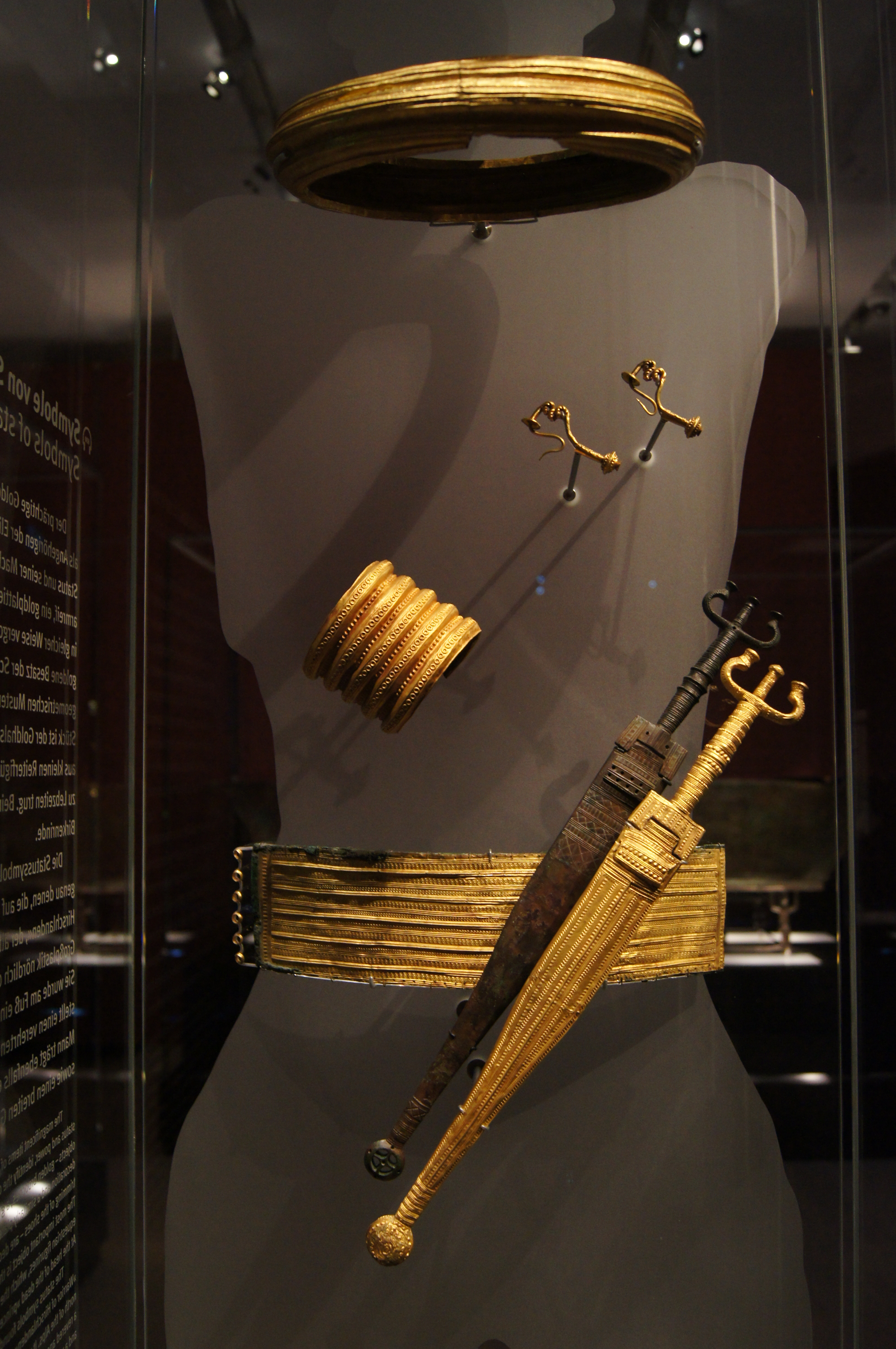
Gold artefacts

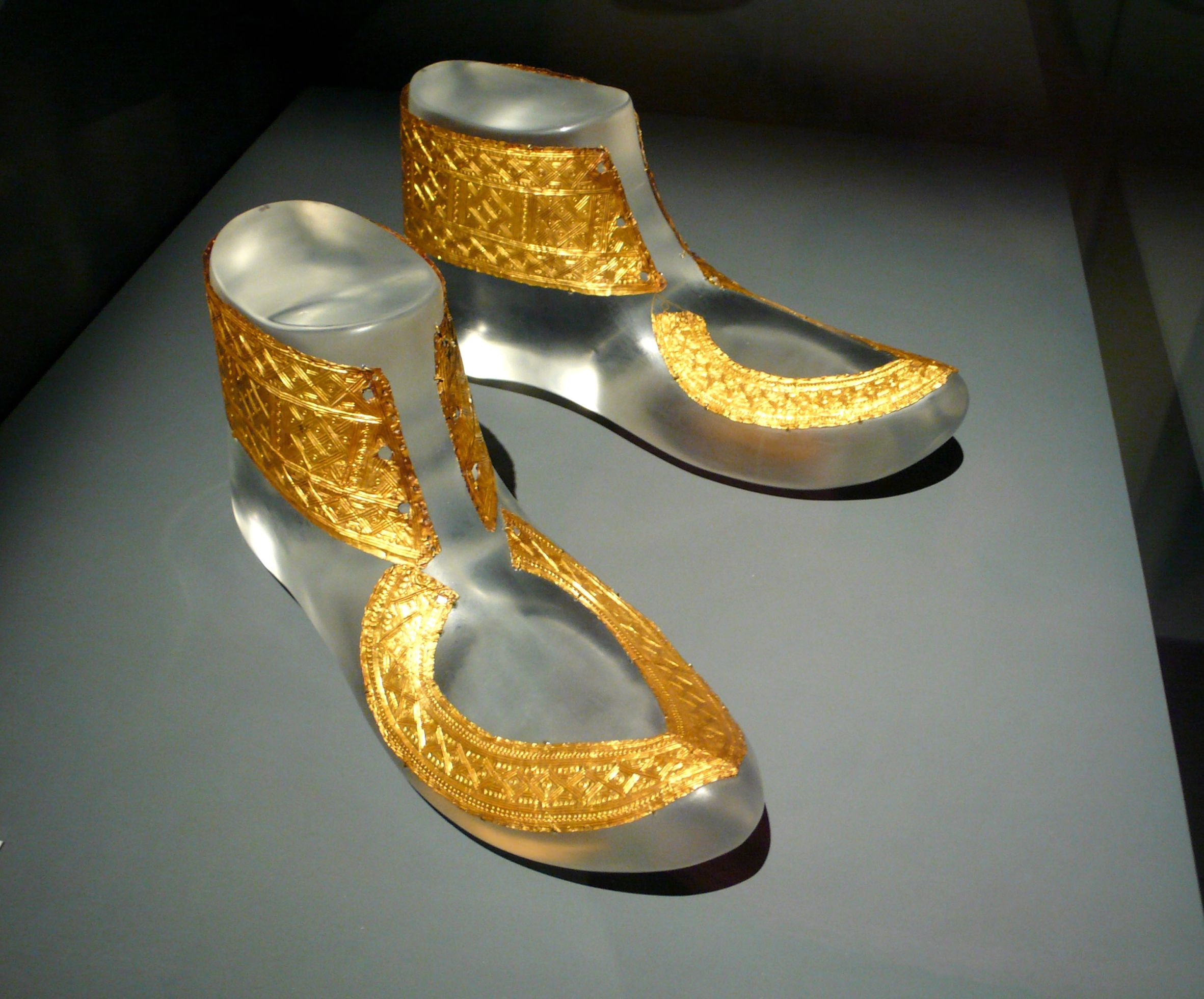
Golden shoe ornaments

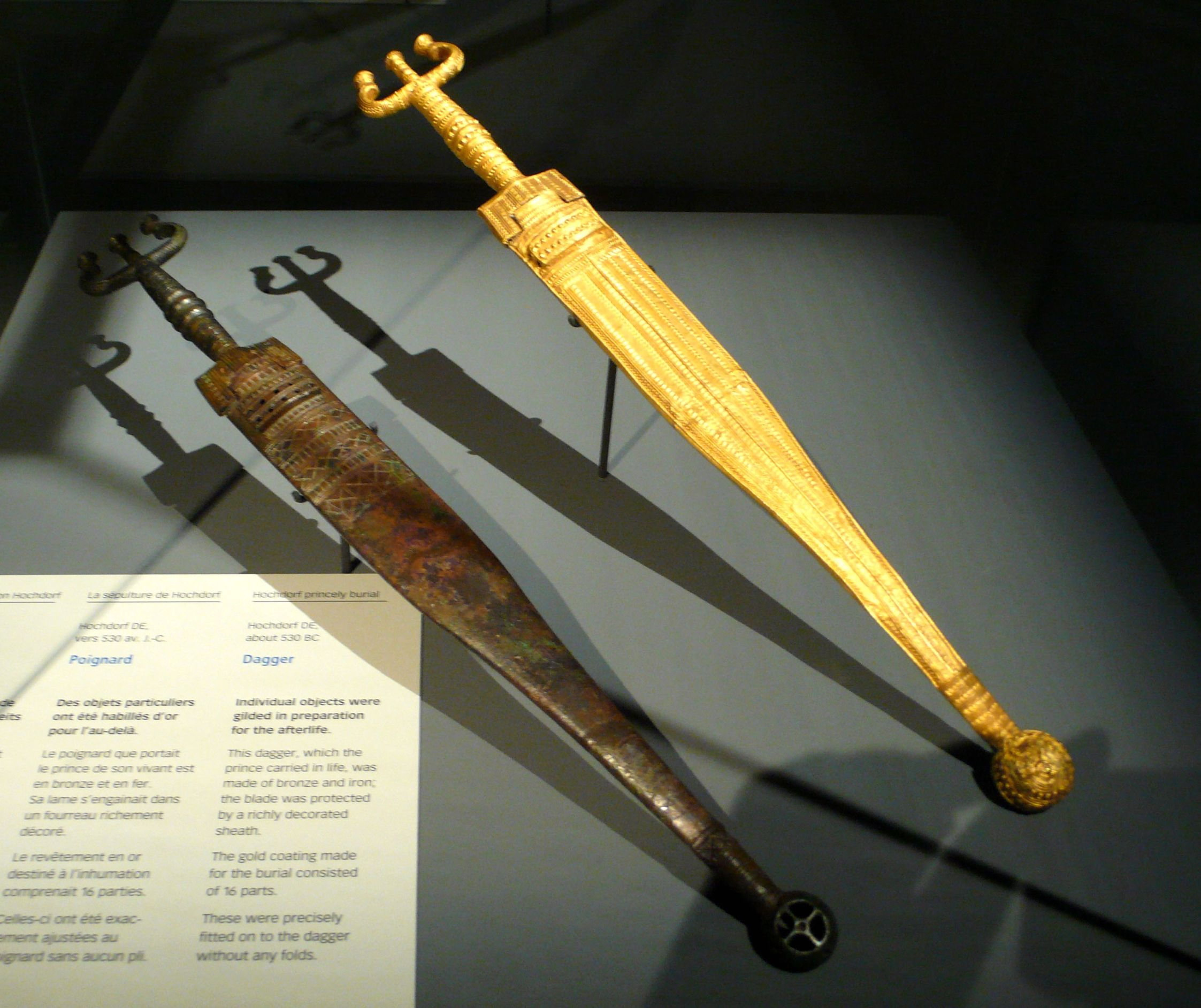
Dagger with gold foil

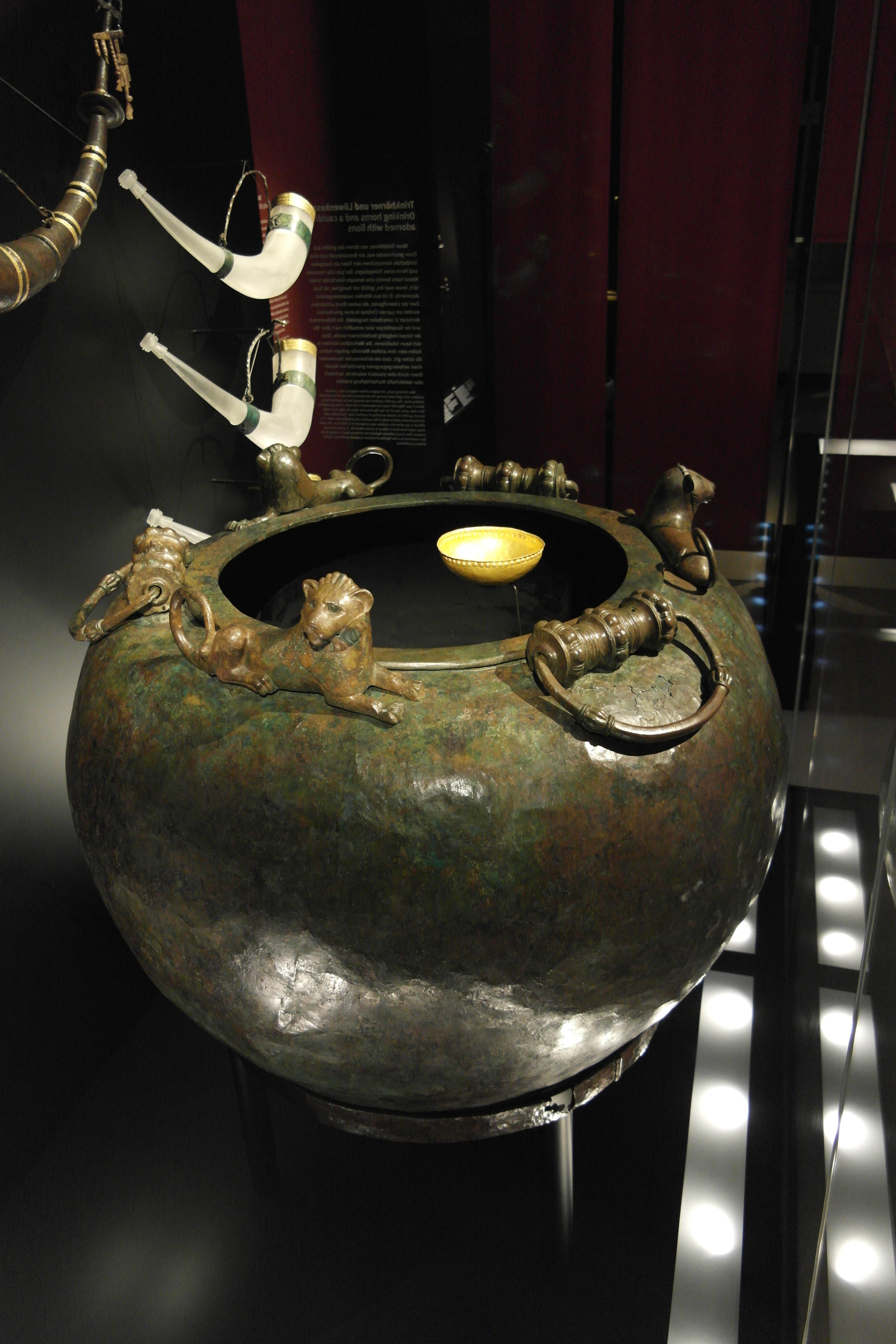
Cauldron and gold bowl

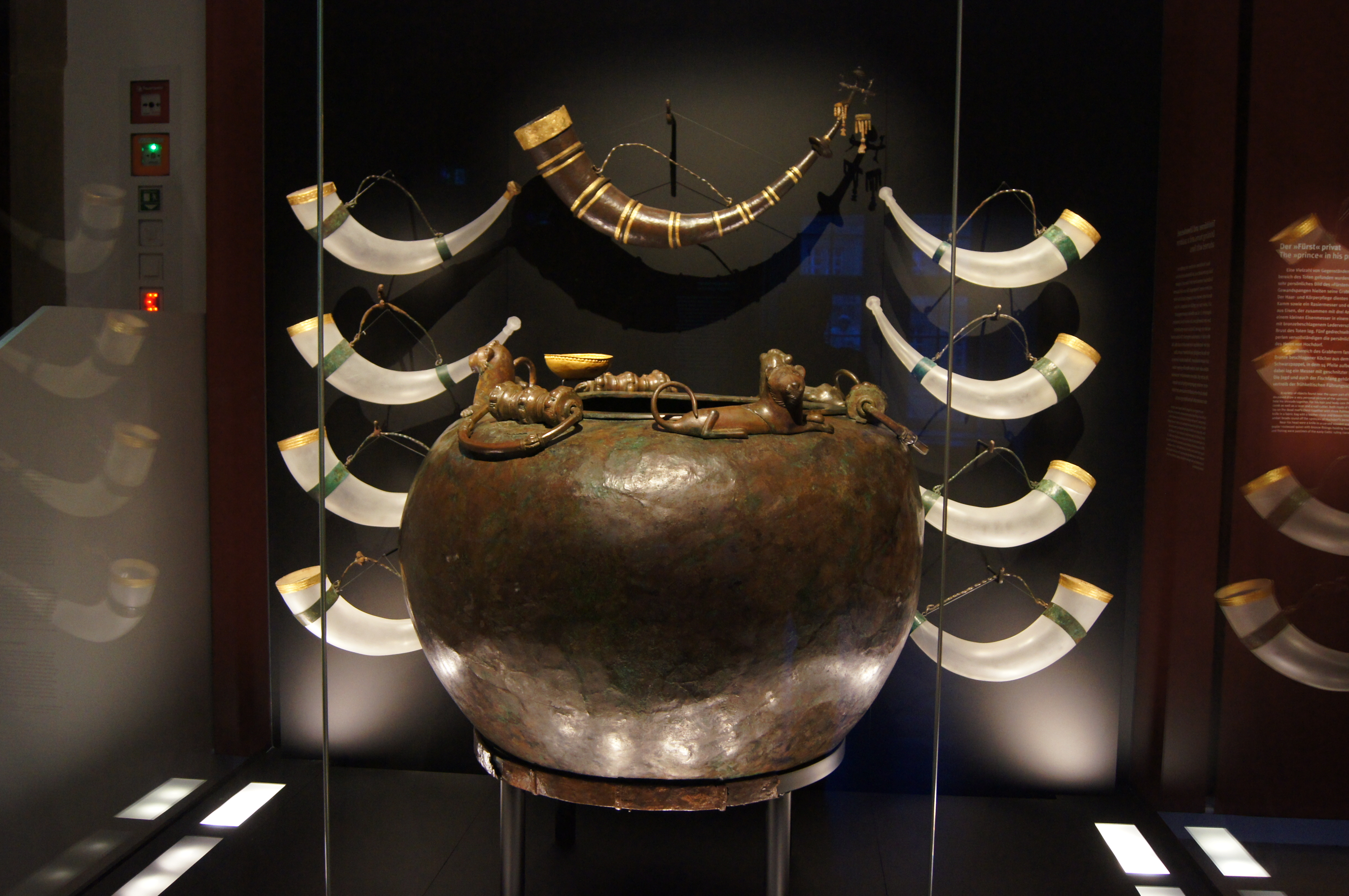
Cauldron with drinking horns

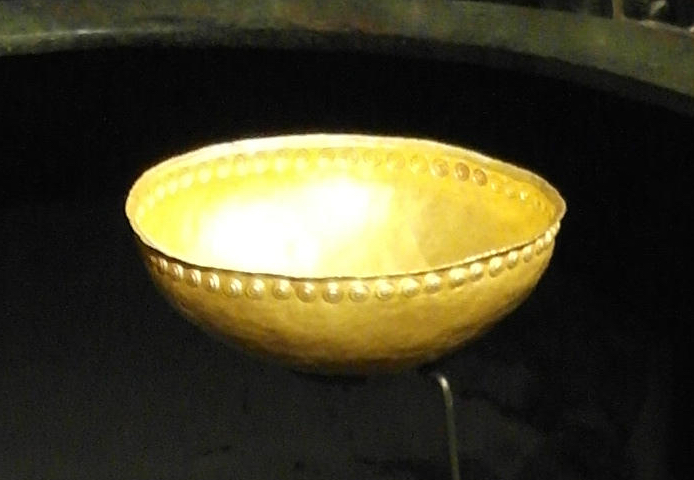
Gold serving bowl

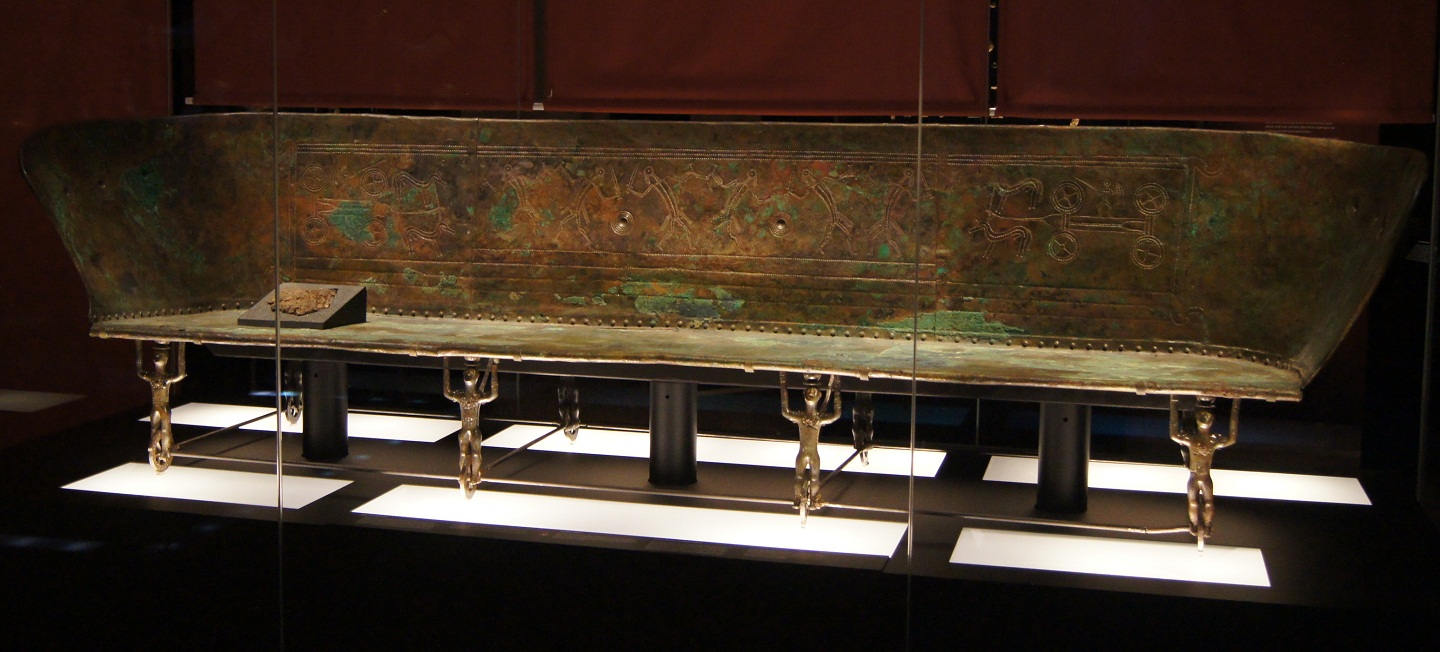
Bronze recliner

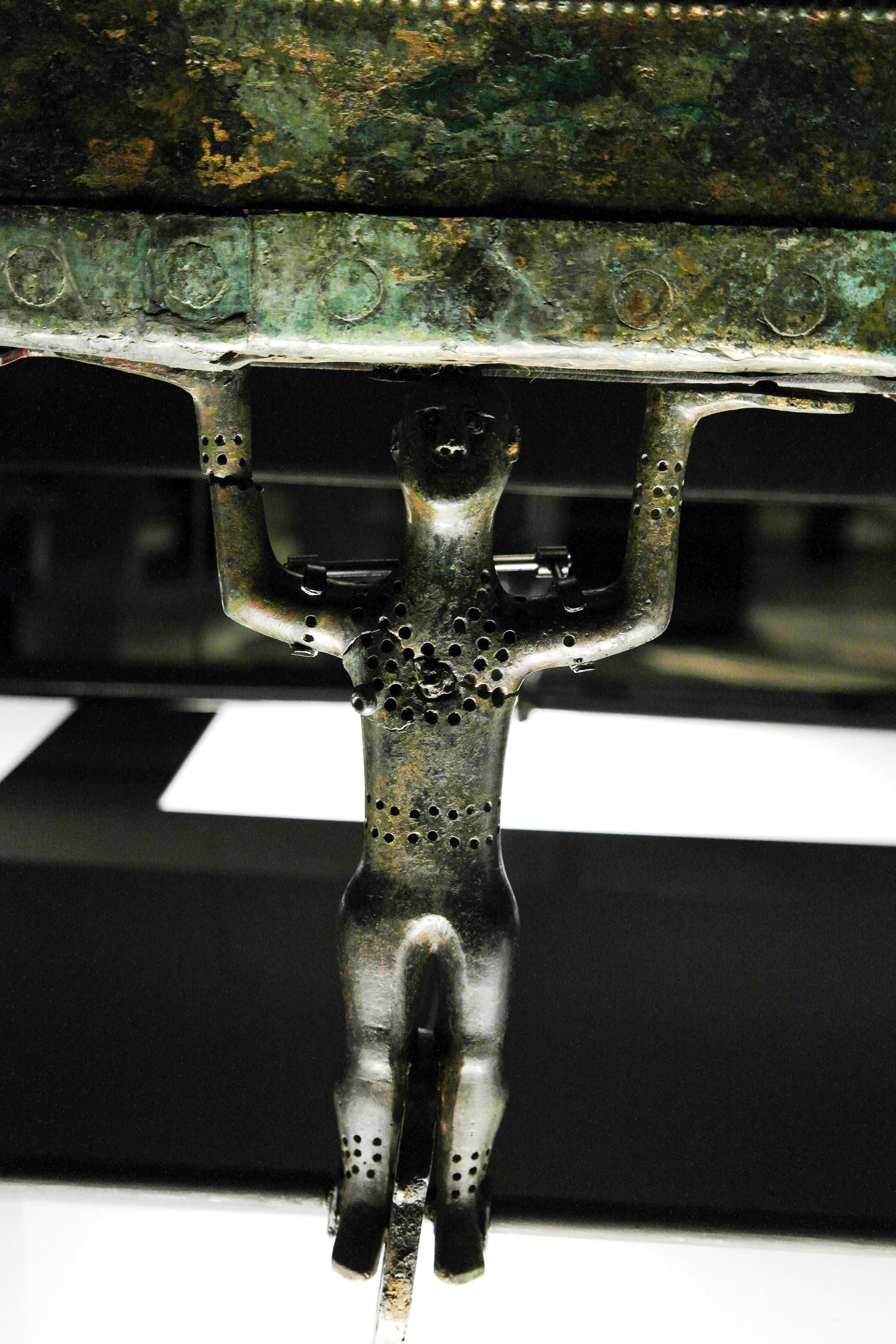
Figurine supporting the bronze recliner

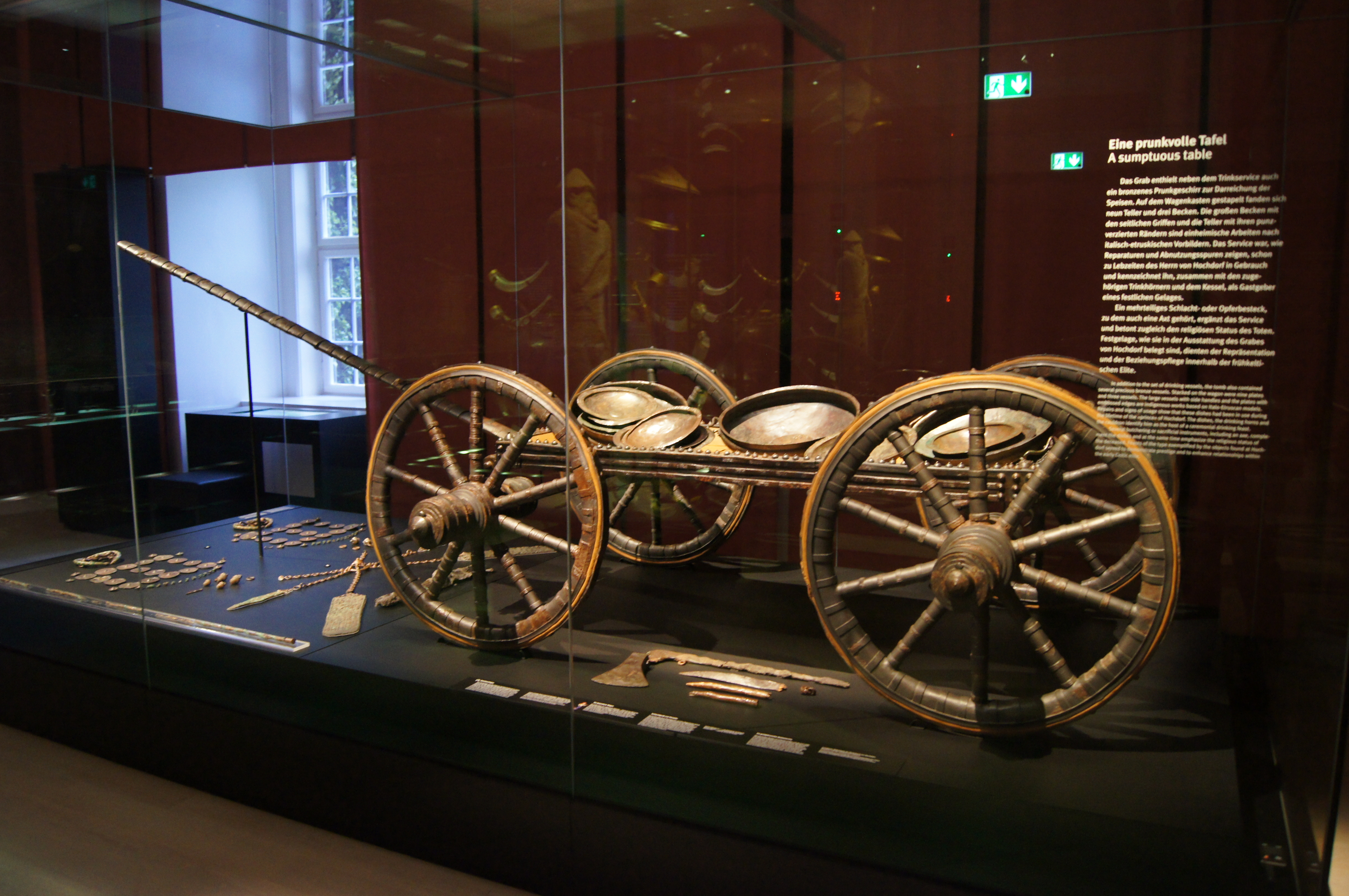
Funerary wagon reconstruction and display

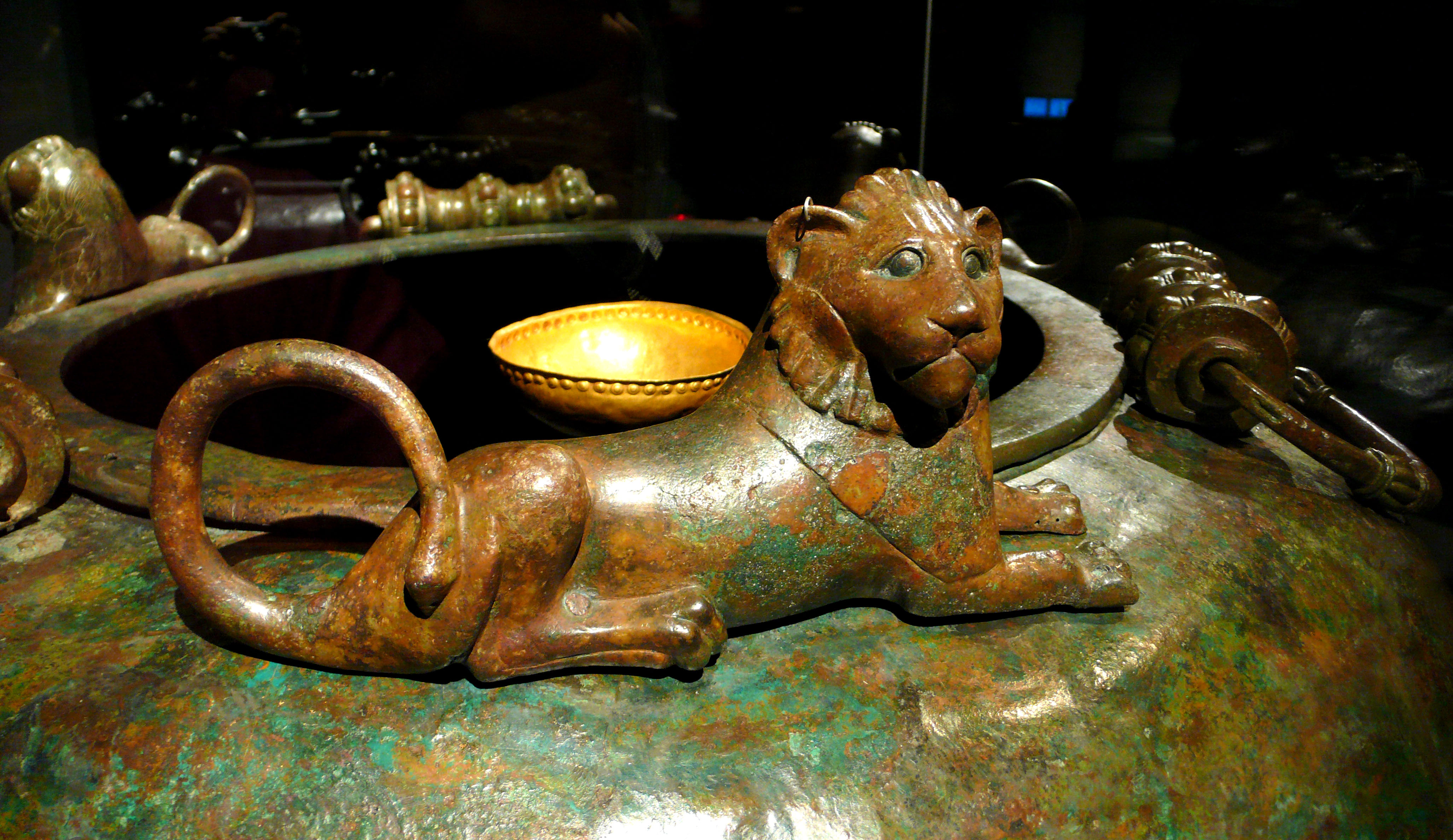
Bronze lion

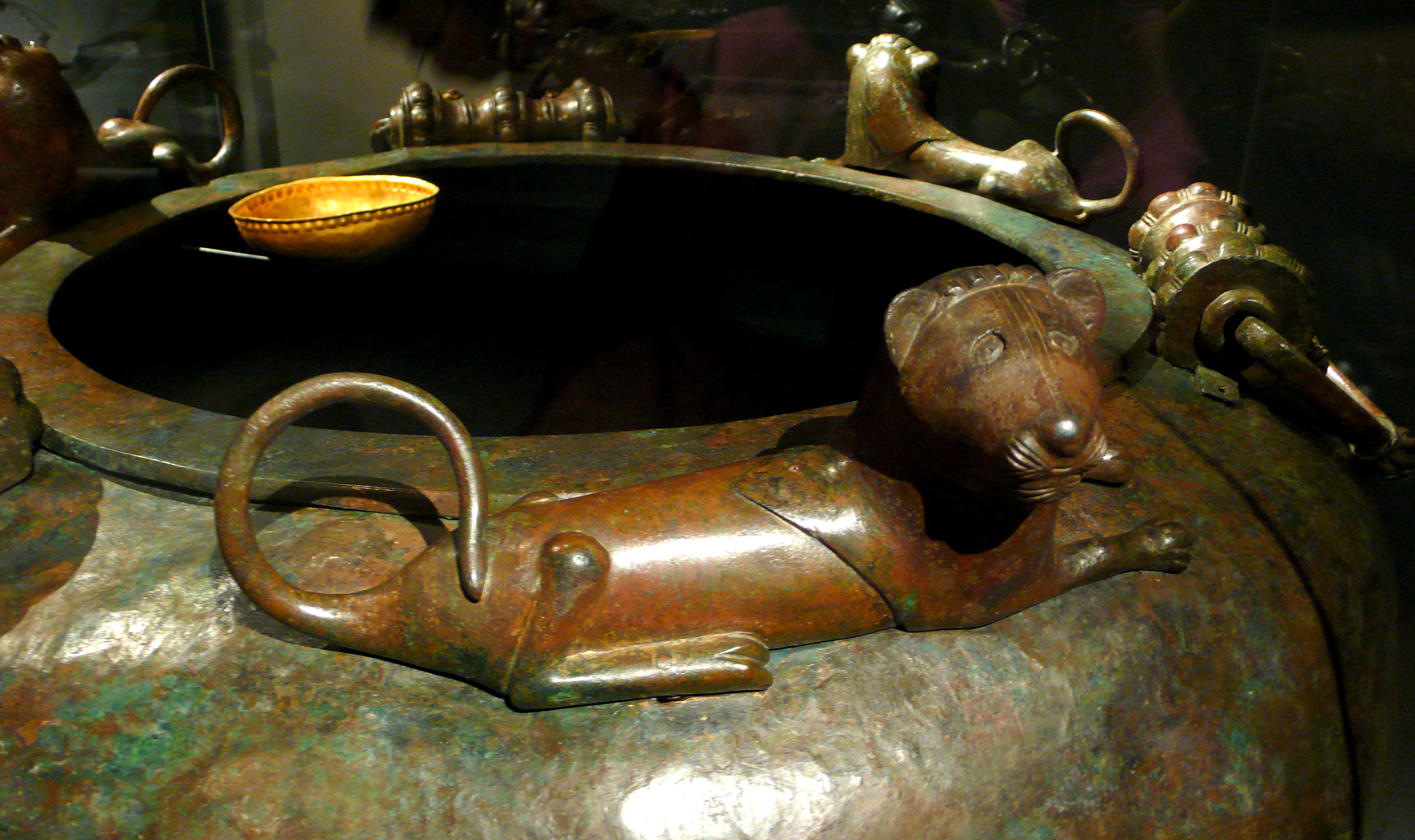
Bronze lion

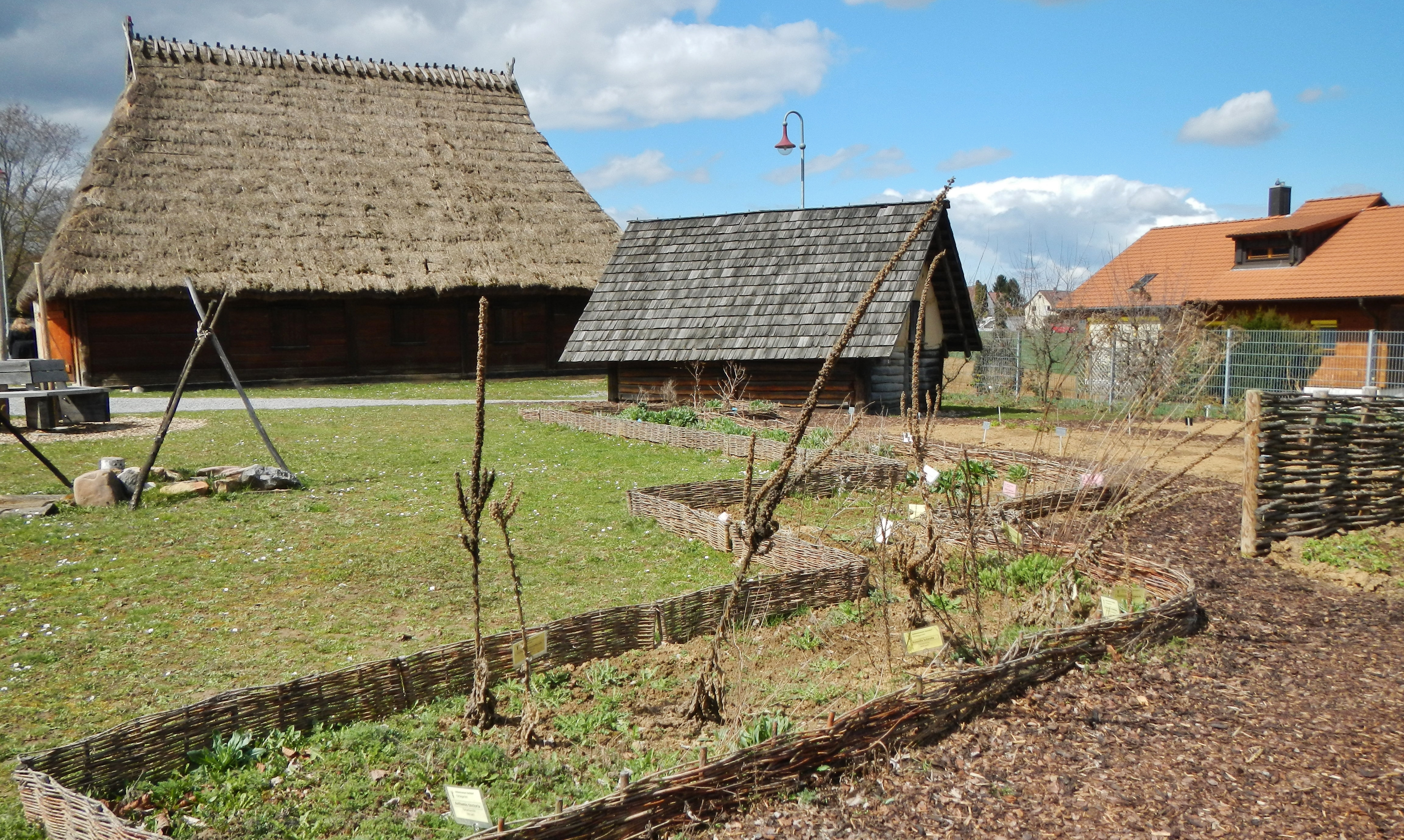
Reconstructed buildings from the Celtic village at Hochdorf

== See also ==
- Prehistoric Europe
- Vix Grave and Mont Lassois
- Heuneburg
- Glauberg
- Hohenasperg
- Ipf
- Burgstallkogel
- Alte Burg
- Sainte-Colombe-sur-Seine
- Lavau
- Grafenbühl grave
- Grächwil
- La Tène culture
- Battersea cauldron
- Caergwrle Bowl

== Sources ==
- James, Simon. 1993. Exploring the World of the Celts. London: Thames & Hudson ISBN 0-500-27998-5: pp. 26–27.
- The Celts at IMDb. This 1986 BBC documentary refers to the Hochdorf chieftain as "The Man with the Golden Shoes".
