= Bohnacker Systeme =

German furniture company

Bohnacker Systeme GmbH
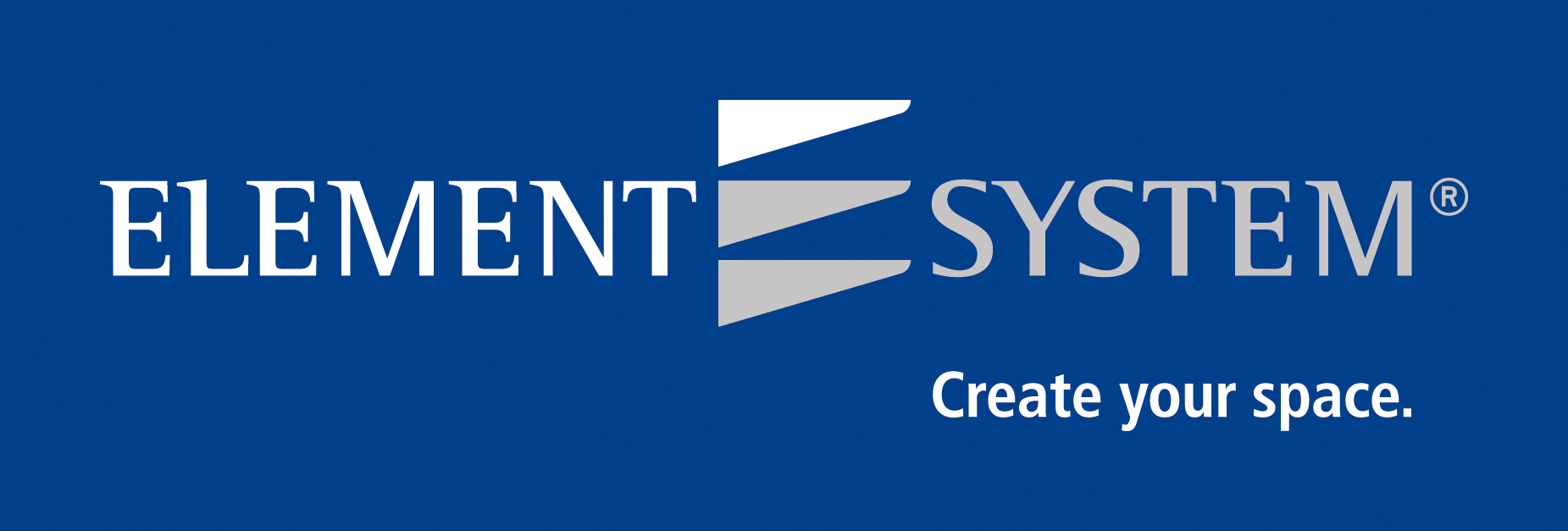
- Type: GmbH
- Industry: steel, furniture, DIY
- Founded: 1954
- Headquarters: Rottenacker, Germany
- Key people: Günther Steudle (CEO)
- Products: furniture, frame, shelf systems
- Revenue: ca. 60.000.000 € (2008)
- Number of employees: ca. 500 (2008)
- Website: www.bohnacker-systeme.com

The Bohnacker Systeme GmbH is a German SME with its headquarters in the Swabian Rottenacker near Ulm. The Bohnacker Systems GmbH produces mainly shelving systems for consumers and pharmacies and shopfitting systems. Bohnacker Systeme is European market leader in the shelves and storage systems for the end consumer.

== Structure ==
The strategic business areas are within DIY Element System. About the brand Element System shelving system are mainly sold for DIY in building centers.

In rack systems in the DIY sector is DIY Element System GmbH European market leader, it is the market share in France and Austria at 80%, in the Benelux at around 70% and in the Switzerland and in Greece at around 50%. For several years, also tried to tap new markets such as in Turkey and South America.

== Locations ==
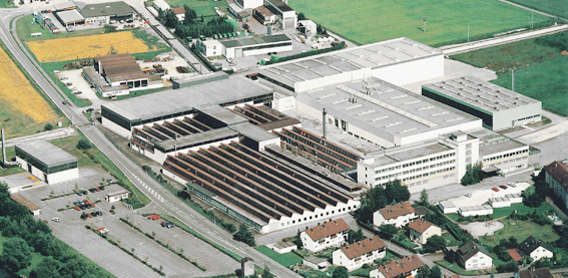
Aerial view of Bohnacker plant Rottenacker

- Rottenacker, Germany
- Csót, Hungary

== History ==
In 1954, the company in Blaubeuren founded by Rudolf Bohnacker. 1959 was the move to a new plant in Rottenacker. 1977, the company received connected to the European rail network. In 1986, the tool making to separate WMB Ltd. outsourced. In 1992 a plant in Hungary Csót opened.
