= Cordoned bucket =

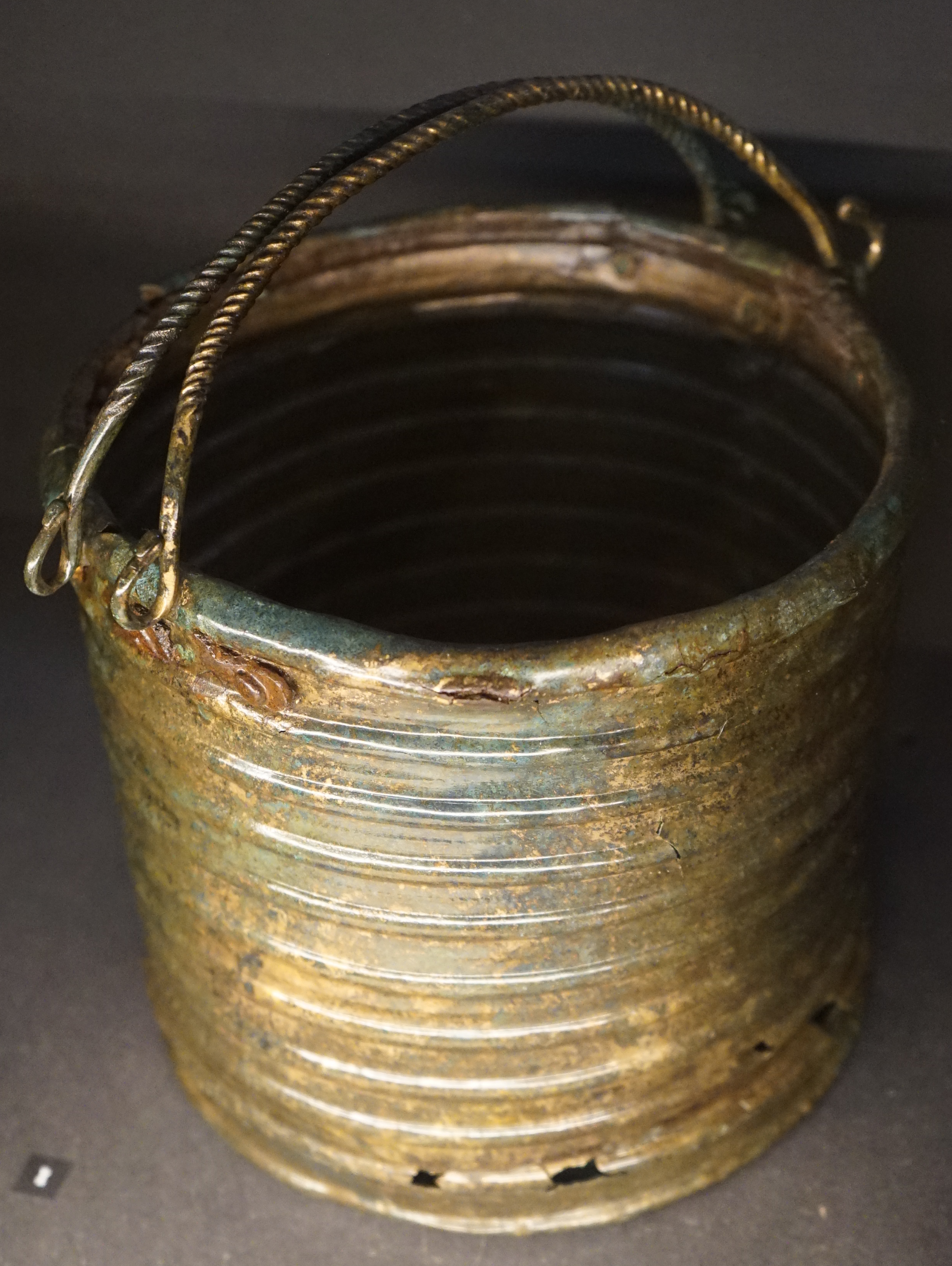
Cordoned bucket found in Estissac.

A cordoned bucket or ribbed cista (Italian: Cista a cordoni, German: Rippenziste) is a type of Iron Age ribbed, cylindrical bronze bucket. Examples have been found across Europe, though especially in Italy, Istria, and Slovenia. Cordoned buckets date to between the 8th and 4th centuries BC, within the Hallstatt and early La Tène cultures. The earliest were produced within central-northern Europe, spreading quickly outwards. Cordoned buckets were probably used by elites in wine service.

== See also ==
- Cista
- Stamnos
