= Stehenbach =

River in Germany

Location
- Country: Germany
- State: Baden-Württemberg

Physical characteristics
- Mouth
  - location: Danube
  - coordinates: 48.2323°N 9.6923°E
- Length: 12.3 km (7.6 mi)

Basin features
- Progression: Danube→ Black Sea

Stehenbach (also: Stehbach) is a river of Baden-Württemberg, Germany. It flows into the Danube in Rottenacker.

== See also ==
- List of rivers of Baden-Württemberg
