= Sotades Painter =

5th-century BCE Athenian vase painter

The Sotades Painter (fl. 470 BCE–450 BCE) was a 5th-century BCE Athenian vase painter, "one of the most familiar names in vase painting".

Sotades is the potter's signature on his vases; it may have also been the name of the painter himself.

Sotades worked in both red figure and white ground technique.
