= Norath =

- Municipality
- Coat of arms

- Location of Norath within Rhein-Hunsrück-Kreis district
- Interactive map of Norath
- Location within Germany Location within Rhineland-Palatinate
- Coordinates: 50°7′35″N 7°34′35″E
- Country: Germany
- State: Rhineland-Palatinate
- District: Rhein-Hunsrück-Kreis
- Municipal assoc.: Hunsrück-Mittelrhein

Government
  - Mayor (2019–24): Arno Morschhäuser

Area
  - Total: 3.3 km^{2} (1.3 sq mi)
- Elevation: 460 m (1,510 ft)

Population (2025-12-31)
  - Total: 491
  - Density: 150/km^{2} (390/sq mi)
- Time zone: UTC+01:00 (CET)
  - Summer (DST): UTC+02:00 (CEST)
- Postal codes: 56291
- Dialling codes: 06746
- Vehicle registration: SIM
- Website: www.norath.de

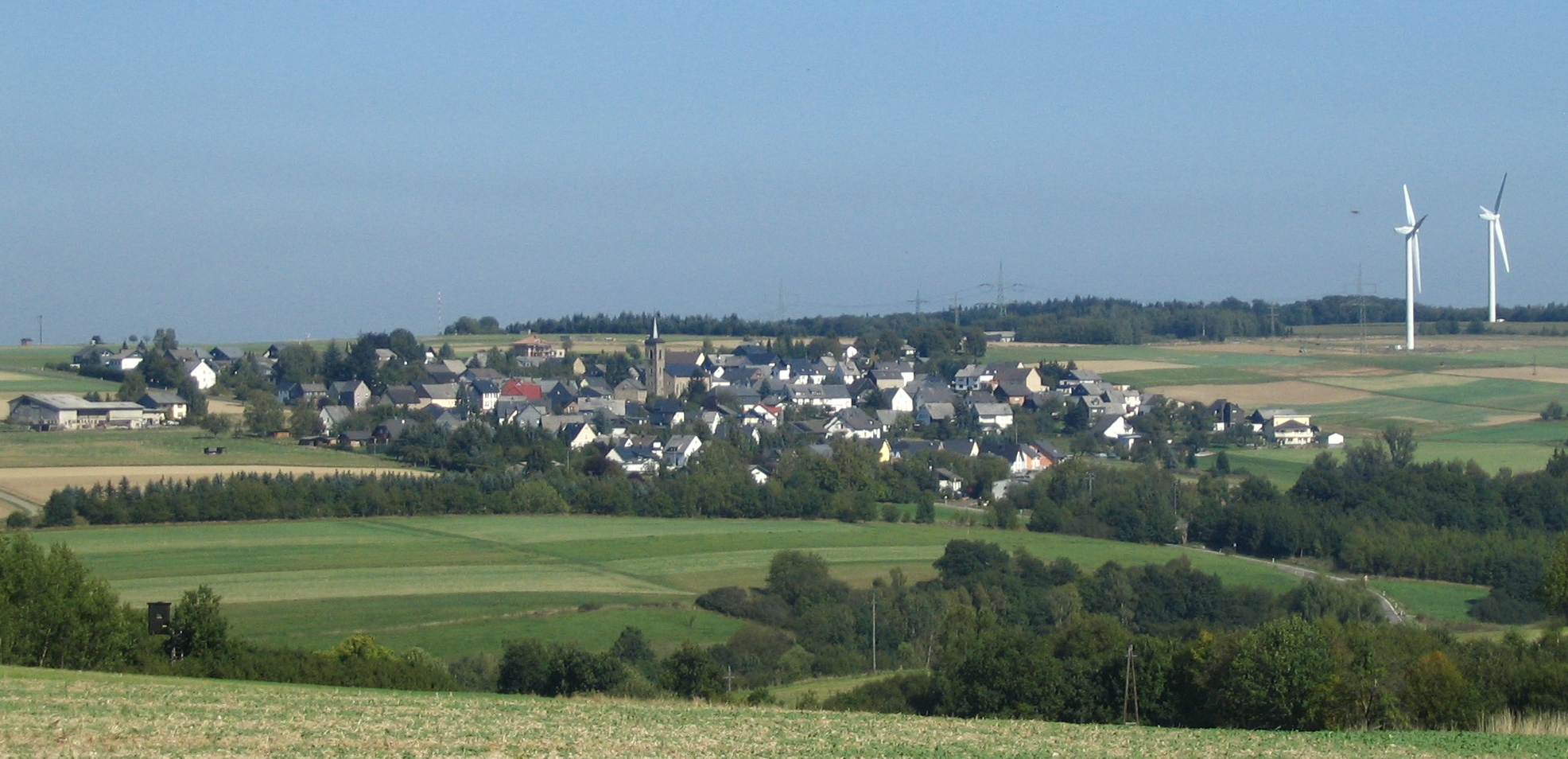
Norath seen from the southwest

Norath is an Ortsgemeinde – a municipality belonging to a Verbandsgemeinde, a kind of collective municipality – in the Rhein-Hunsrück-Kreis (district) in Rhineland-Palatinate, Germany. It belongs to the Verbandsgemeinde Hunsrück-Mittelrhein, whose seat is in Emmelshausen.

== Geography ==
=== Location ===
The municipality lies in the eastern Hunsrück nestled within a greenbelt of woodland and meadowland, roughly 3 km southeast of Emmelshausen, right on Schinderhannes-Radweg (cycle path).

== Name ==
Norath's name comes from the old word rod, from the same stem as the German verb roden, meaning “clear (woods, trees)”. When early settlers began to move into the Hunsrück seeking new lands for living and raising crops, they at first settled at the place now known as Hungenroth, some 10 km west of Sankt Goar on the Hunsrück heights. After only a few years, though, it had become quite clear to the settlers that the soil there was too infertile and boggy. Even hard work never yielded harvests that were good enough to keep the settlers fed. This led them to call their new home Hungerrodung (“Hunger Clearing”). A further clearing only 3 km to the east, however, held greater promise of agricultural bounty. This became known as Neurodung (“New Clearing”). Over time, the pronunciation changed to “Norath”.

== History ==
About 1000 BC, it seems that the Celts, coming from the east, crossed the Rhine and settled the lands between that river on the one side and the Atlantic Ocean and the Pyrenees on the other. Germanic peoples from east of the Rhine, however, eventually crossed the river, too, invaded the Celts’ lands and dislodged them therefrom. The Germanic conquerors then themselves settled these lands. Between 60 and 50 BC, Julius Caesar extended the Roman Empire’s hegemony from the west over to the Rhine. The Romans called the lands between the Rhine and the Atlantic Ocean Gallia (rendered “Gaul” in English), and their rule lasted more than 500 years. They farmed land that in places had been considered wasteland, built paths and in places roads. Even today, an old Roman road runs from Bingen by way of Rheinböllen, Kisselbach, Maisborn, Pfalzfeld, Norath, Dörth and Pfaffenheck to Koblenz.

In the 4th century AD, the Franks appeared on the Lower Rhine. These were tribes that had long held the lands on the Middle Rhine’s right bank, but now, down on the Lower Rhine, they were beginning to settle on the left bank. From their new foothold there, they pushed south towards the Moselle, later spreading across that river into the Hunsrück. In 455, under Merovingian King Childeric I, the Franks put an end to Roman rule throughout the Middle Rhine region and established their own ascendancy over it. Under Childeric’s son, Clovis I, Christianity was introduced throughout the Frankish Empire, including Norath. In those days, there were royal palaces in Koblenz, Boppard and Oberwesel. The Franks divided their whole empire up into dukedoms, which themselves were further divided into Gaue (singular, Gau; roughly, a region), and these further still into Hundertschaften.

In the early 9th century, and thus in Charlemagne’s and his successors’ time, the Norath area belonged to the Dukedom of Moselania. After the partition of the Carolingian Empire in the 843 Treaty of Verdun, Norath passed to the Dukedom of Lotharingia, named after Emperor Lothair I. After Lothair II's death, Charles the Bald of France and Louis the German agreed in the 870 Treaty of Meerssen that all the late Lothair's lands on the Moselle's and the Meuse's left bank were to pass to Charles, while all those east of these rivers were to belong to the German Empire.

In Emperor Otto I's time, the Dukes of Lotharingia revolted against the Emperor. To break their power, the Dukedom was sundered in 959 into two parts, Upper and Lower Lotharingia, lying south and north of Andernach respectively. Norath lay in Upper Lotharingia, which was put under the Emperor's immediate authority. The Emperor enfeoffed Gaugrafen (roughly, “regional counts”) with the area. These counts held judicial and military power, although these rights were later transferred to bishops, and thus grew the bishops’ lordly power. Many counts proved too weak to guard their holdings against robber knights, and chose to hand them over to the bishops and then had themselves enfeoffed with their own former holdings. Among the knights in the Norath area were the Knights of Brunshorn, whose castle stood near today's Braunshorn. This put Norath within the Knights’ territory, which was a fief from the Electors of Trier. Later, the fiefs passed back to Trier, and the Lords of Metternich received the Elector's blessing as the new feudal lords. Thereafter, Norath was ruled by the Lords of Metternich-Beilstein.

At the time of the Reformation, Lord of Beilstein and Landgrave of Hesse-Cassel Philip I's conversion to Lutheran teaching meant that everyone on the Vogtei of Pfalzfeld, and therefore in Norath, too, had to do the same. These lords forced their subjects to forswear their old beliefs.

In 1581, the Plague broke out. Many people died, and Norath's population, too, shrank. The Thirty Years' War brought Norath hardship and misery, as was so throughout Germany. Soldiers came robbing and plundering villages, and then set many of them on fire. In some places, people were massacred. In the Vogtei of Pfalzfeld, only ten of originally forty families are said to have survived the onslaught.

In 1650, Norath had been utterly destroyed and nobody lived there. In the century that followed, many people settled there and repopulated it. In 1793, the village fell into French hands. What there was left to destroy, the French destroyed. After they had occupied the whole left bank of the Rhine, Norath belonged to the subprefecture of Simmern, the canton of St. Goar and the Mairie (“Mayoralty”) of Pfalzfeld. For a time, between 1813 and 1842, the mayor had his official seat in Norath (the Mayoralty was by now called a Bürgermeisterei under the Prussians), but as of 1843, the mayor's office had moved back to Pfalzfeld. It cannot be denied that the French under Napoleon did much for the Rhineland. For example, they built a road along the Rhine, now known as Bundesstraße 9. Nevertheless, Rhinelanders did not like French rule. It ended quickly enough with the War of the Sixth Coalition and then the Congress of Vienna, under which the Rhine's left bank was assigned in 1815 to the Kingdom of Prussia, and along with it, so was Norath. More locally, Norath found itself in the Rhine Province, the Regierungsbezirk of Koblenz, the district of St. Goar and the mayoral Amt of Pfalzfeld. After the Second World War, Norath found itself in the French zone of occupation. In 1949, when the Federal Republic (in its initial form, West Germany) was formed, Norath became part of the then newly founded state of Rhineland-Palatinate.

The Wirtschaftswunder since the Second World War changed the village forever. Whereas before everyone worked small farm plots and thought merely about their daily bread, more and more families now let their fields and meadows out and either move to the industrial centres or become craftsmen and craftswomen at big and small businesses in the neighbouring towns and cities. Modern amenities, such as watermains, sewers, tarred streets and freezing facilities have changed the village's face. The Hunsrück has become a recreational region for city dwellers, which has prompted Norath to lay on lodging and supplies for those from the Rhineland and the Ruhr industrial areas seeking recreation. There are several inns and pensions.

=== Grube Camilla ===
The Grube Camilla, a lead and zinc mine, was built in the late 1940s and early 1950s. The mineshaft up which the ore was lifted was about 200 m deep. At the 50 and 100 m levels, galleries were driven out towards Badenhard. By the early 1960s, though, the ore yield had shrunk to unprofitable proportions and as a result, the mine was closed. Norath's coat of arms still bears the hammer and pick as a charge in reference to the Grube Camilla. The mine was owned by Stolberger Zink AG, which also ran two ore mines in Werlau.

== Politics ==
=== Municipal council ===
The council is made up of 8 council members, who were elected by majority vote at the municipal election held on 7 June 2009, and the honorary mayor as chairman.

=== Mayor ===
Norath's mayor is Arno Morschhäuser, and his deputies are Robert Michel and Hubert Stahl.

=== Coat of arms ===
The German blazon reads: Von silber über rot geteilt, oben ein mit drei goldenen Kugeln belegtes blaues Buch, begleitet vorne schrägrechts ein schwarzer Schlägel, hinten schräglinks ein schwarzer Hammer, unten drei silberne Hifthörner.

The municipality's arms might in English heraldic language be described thus: Per fess, argent a book azure surmounted by three bezants, the whole between a hammer bendwise and a pick bendwise sinister sable, and gules three bugle-horns of the first.

The central charge in the escutcheon’s upper field, the book, is Saint Nicholas’s attribute, thus representing the municipality's and the church's patron saint. This is flanked by a hammer and a pick, together a traditional symbol for mining, which was once undertaken at the Grube Camilla, a lead and zinc mine, where prospecting was being done as early as the 18th century. The escutcheon's lower half is a reference to the village's former allegiance to the Lordship of Braunshorn.

== Culture and sightseeing ==
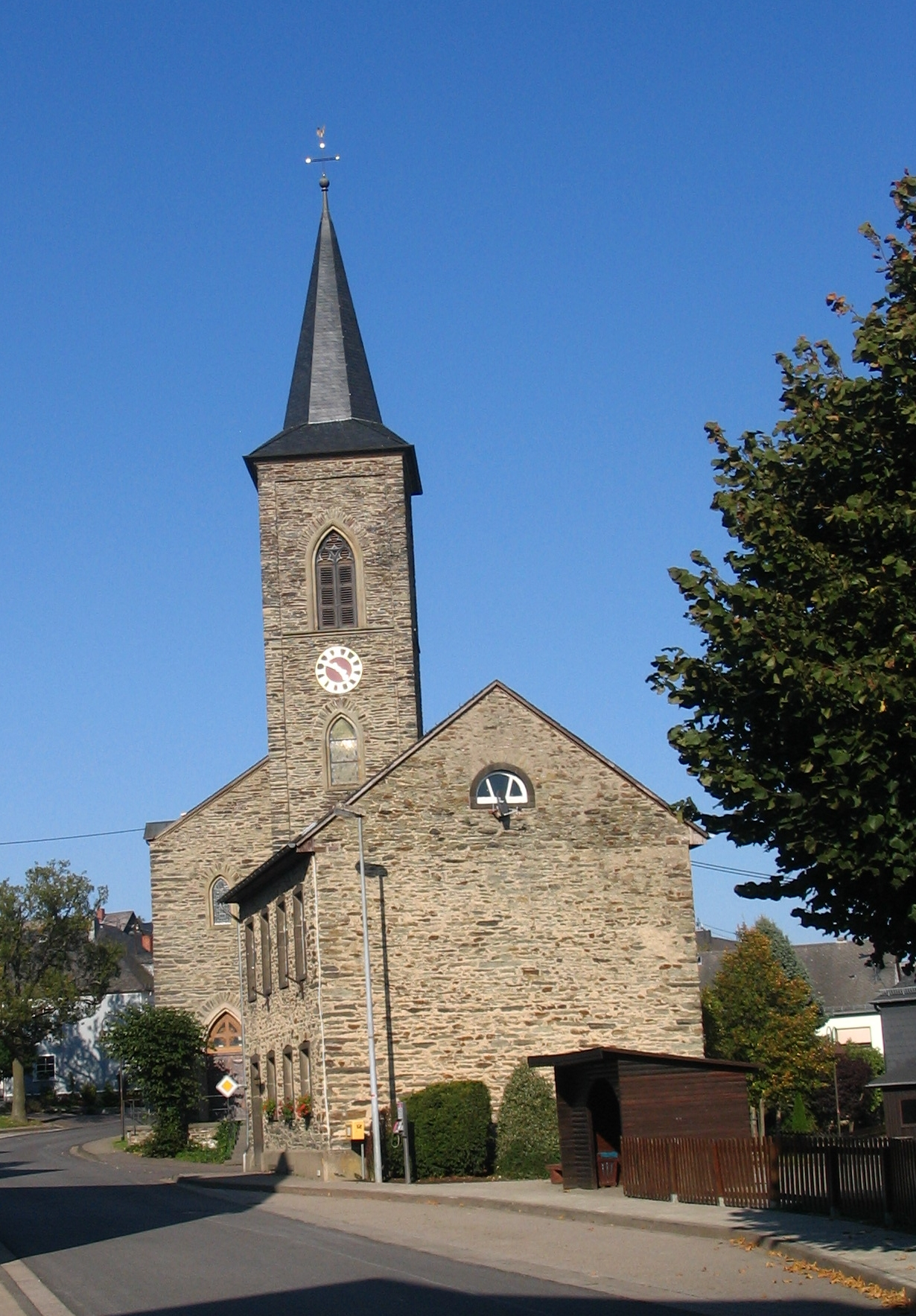
Hauptstraße 10 and 12: former school and Saint Nicholas's Catholic Parish Church

=== Buildings ===
The following are listed buildings or sites in Rhineland-Palatinate’s Directory of Cultural Monuments:

- Saint Nicholas’s Catholic Parish Church (Pfarrkirche St. Nikolaus), Hauptstraße 12: Gothic Revival quarrystone aisleless church, towards 1859
- Hauptstraße 10: former school; quarrystone building, about 1840, emulating Johann Claudius von Lassaulx
- Hauptstraße 25: estate complex along the street; timber-frame house, partly slated, earlier half of the 19th century; whole complex of buildings

=== Clubs ===
- Musikverein St. Nikolaus Norath 1958 e.V. (music club)

=== Regular events ===
- Veilchendienstags-Zug (Shrove Tuesday parade)
- Kermis
