= Celtic leaf-crown =

Celtic art motif

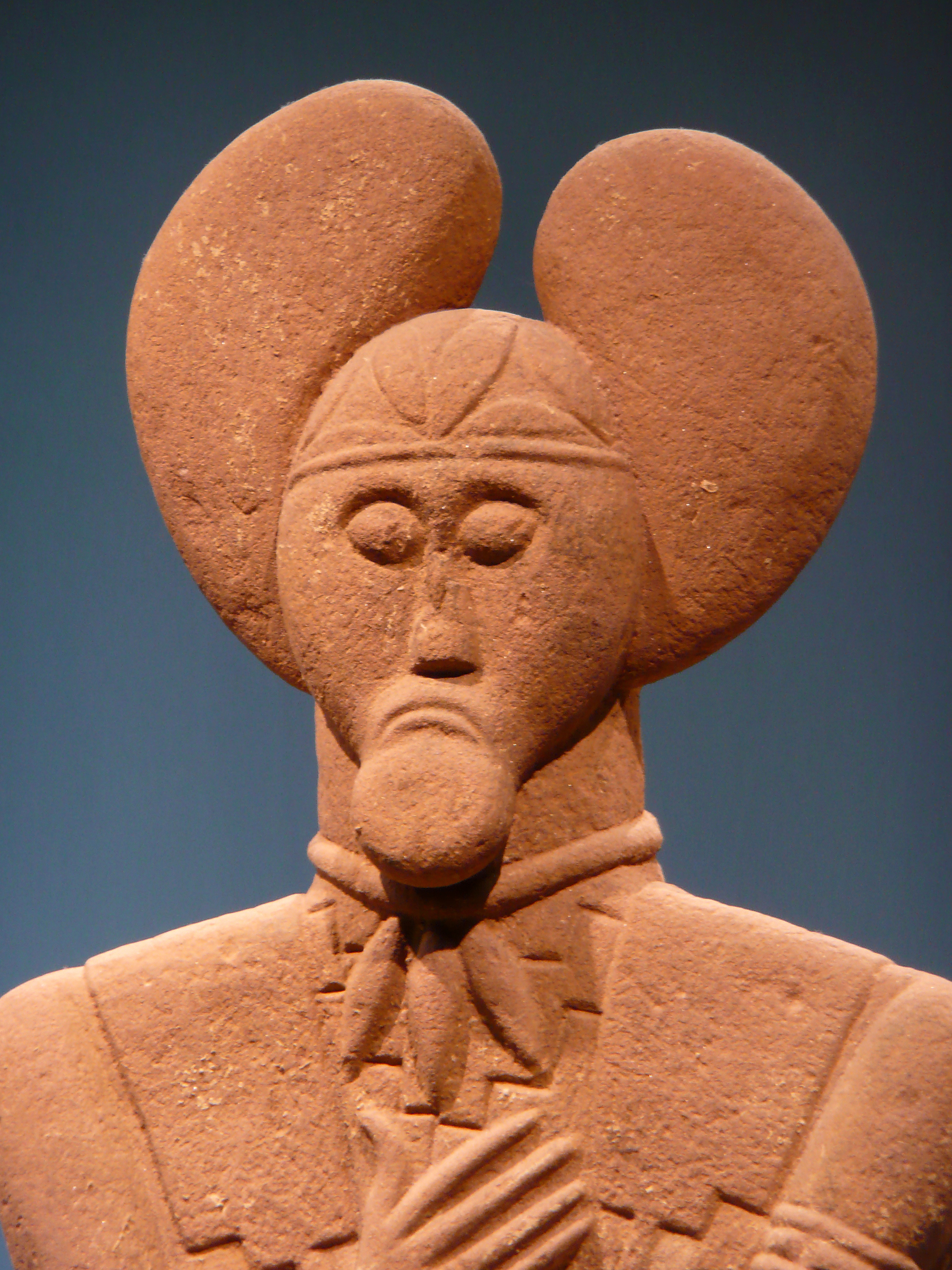
The Glauberg prince wears an asymmetrical leaf-crown.

The Celtic leaf-crown (German: Blattkrone) is a motif of Celtic art from the early La Tène period. A leaf-crown is composed of two broad lobe-shaped elements. The crowns adorn the heads of anthropomorphic figures, almost always male and often bearded. The lobes have been identified with mistletoe leaves. The interpretation of this motif is doubtful, but it has been suggested to bear connotations of high status or divinity.

== History of the term ==
The term "leaf-crown" was introduced by art historian Paul Jacobsthal in his 1944 book Early Celtic Art. This motif had been previously termed the "fish-bladder" (German: Fischblasen) design. Jacobsthal wrote of the leaf-crown that it was "more than mere 'ornament'", and conjectured that it was a symbol of "superhuman beings, gods or deified mortals." (Note: Others had made conjectures about the meaning of this motif before Jacobsthal. Robert Knorr interpreted the lobes as wings and took the figures bearing them to be identifiable with the Roman god Mercury (who wears a winged hat). Peter Goessler took the lobes for stylised hair. Goessler and Jacobsthal roundly reject Knorr's conjecture.)

== Description and history ==
Leaf-crowns adorn the heads of anthropomorphic figures, almost always male (Note: One possible exception to this is the leaf-crowned figure on the Waldalgesheim chariot, which has been conjecturally identified as female.) and often bearded. (Note: Exceptions to this rule are clustered around the Rhineland area. One notable such exception is a reversible figure made out of gold foil, uncovered in Bad Dürkheim. Oriented one way up it depicts a clean-shaven face adorned with a leaf-crown; oriented the other way, an old, bearded man.) The leaf-crown is a ubiquitous motif in early La Tène art, surviving on precious metalwork and on stone monuments. Leaf-crowns have been found as far east as Hořovičky in Bohemia. Celtic fibulae are often decorated with leaf-crowned faces. Such metalwork has been found in the burials of elite men and women, such as that of the Reinheim 'princess'. Some have suggested, on the basis of fragmentary archaeological evidence, that actual leaf-crowns of leather were made by the Celts (discussed below). Sometimes the leaf-crown is depicted in concert with other motifs, such as gold torcs or lotus flower designs, but the leaf-crown was apparently symbolically potent enough that it was often allowed to stand on its own.

Artefacts bearing leaf-crowns are generally dated to the early La Tène period, with the earliest dated leaf-crowns in metalwork. Celtic leaf-crowns belong to a period when Central Europe was open to Mediterranean influences, for example from the Etruscans and Greeks. There is no doubt that design elements from these cultures were adopted by the Celts and adapted to fit their belief systems. For example, the leaf-crown is depicted in concert with the Near Eastern Master of Animals motif on a belt-clasp found at the Weiskirchen barrow and on the Dürrnberg beaked jug. Archaeologist Venceslas Kruta has suggested that the leaf-crown arose from a combination of the palmette and lotus flower designs, both broadly Mediterranean motifs.

Some have detected traces of the leaf-crown in later Celtic art. A stater of the Bodiocasses, dating to the 2nd or 1st century BC, has an obverse depicting a human head with horn-like protrusions which T. G. E. Powell has connected with the leaf-crown. Megaw has suggested that the handle-like helmet which adorns a head on the 1st-century BC Aylesford bucket perhaps represents a very late leaf-crown.

== Interpretation ==
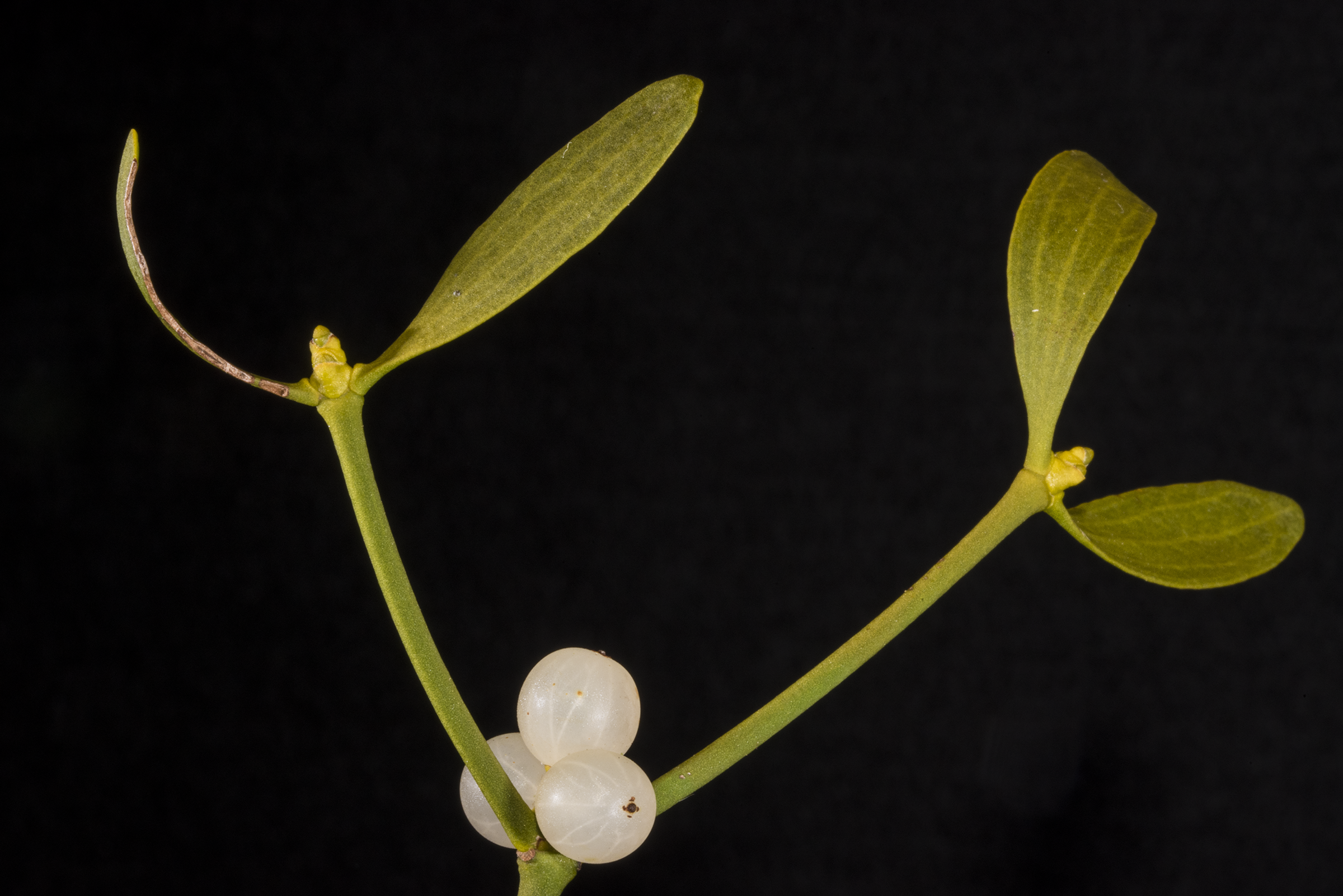
Leaves of European mistletoe. The lobes of the Celtic leaf-crown have been identified with mistletoe leaves.

For the Celts, the head (and especially the severed head) was an extremely important motif and site of veneration. As Vincent Megaw has put it, "to the Celt the human head was regarded as all-important, the heart and soul in one, the symbol of divinity and the Otherworld". Mistletoe also seems to have been religiously important. Pliny describes a Celtic ritual in which druids cut mistletoe from an oak and mixed it to make a fertility potion. With this context, some scholars have identified the lobes of the leaf-crown with leaves of mistletoe.

Important context for the leaf-crown comes from princely grave at the Celtic oppidum of Glauberg. A life-sized sandstone statue found here, called the Glauberg prince or warrior, is one the best known leaf-crowned figures in early La Tène art. Notable is that much of the equipment the person had been buried with is mirrored in the garb of the statue. This suggests there was some level of identification between the statue and the high-status person whose burial this was. The metal lining of a leather bonnet found in Glauberg has been reconstructed by Renate Fröhlich in the shape of the leaf-crown. The ceremonial Agris Helmet, which bears the holes for some sort of crest, has also been suggested to have originally borne a leather leaf-crown. However, it is not clear from this whether the leaf-crown was "a real ruling attribute or if it is just a means for the dead person’s glorification for the passing into the afterlife".

Associations between the leaf-crown and divinity or supernatural power appear throughout early La Tène art. Multiple Janus-faced, leaf-crowned figures are known within early La Tène art: most prominently the Heidelberg head, Holzgerlingen figure, and a two-headed sculpture from the Celtic shrine at Roquepertuse (though its leaf-crown is now broken off). These are often believed to be Celtic cult images or even depictions of a dicephalic god. The lid of the Reinheim flagon is decorated with an anthropomorphic horse statuette, bearded and wearing a leaf-crown. Venceslas Kruta has suggested this statuette is a "representation of a divine being, probably of a solar nature". (Note: Original French: "représentation d’un être divin, très probablement de nature solaire".) The leaf-crowned heads of the Heidelberg head, Glauberg prince, and Pfalzfeld obelisk bear a common lotus motif on their foreheads. In the ancient world, the lotus was a symbol of rebirth, eternity, and of solar gods; here it perhaps possesses a divine meaning.

== Gallery ==
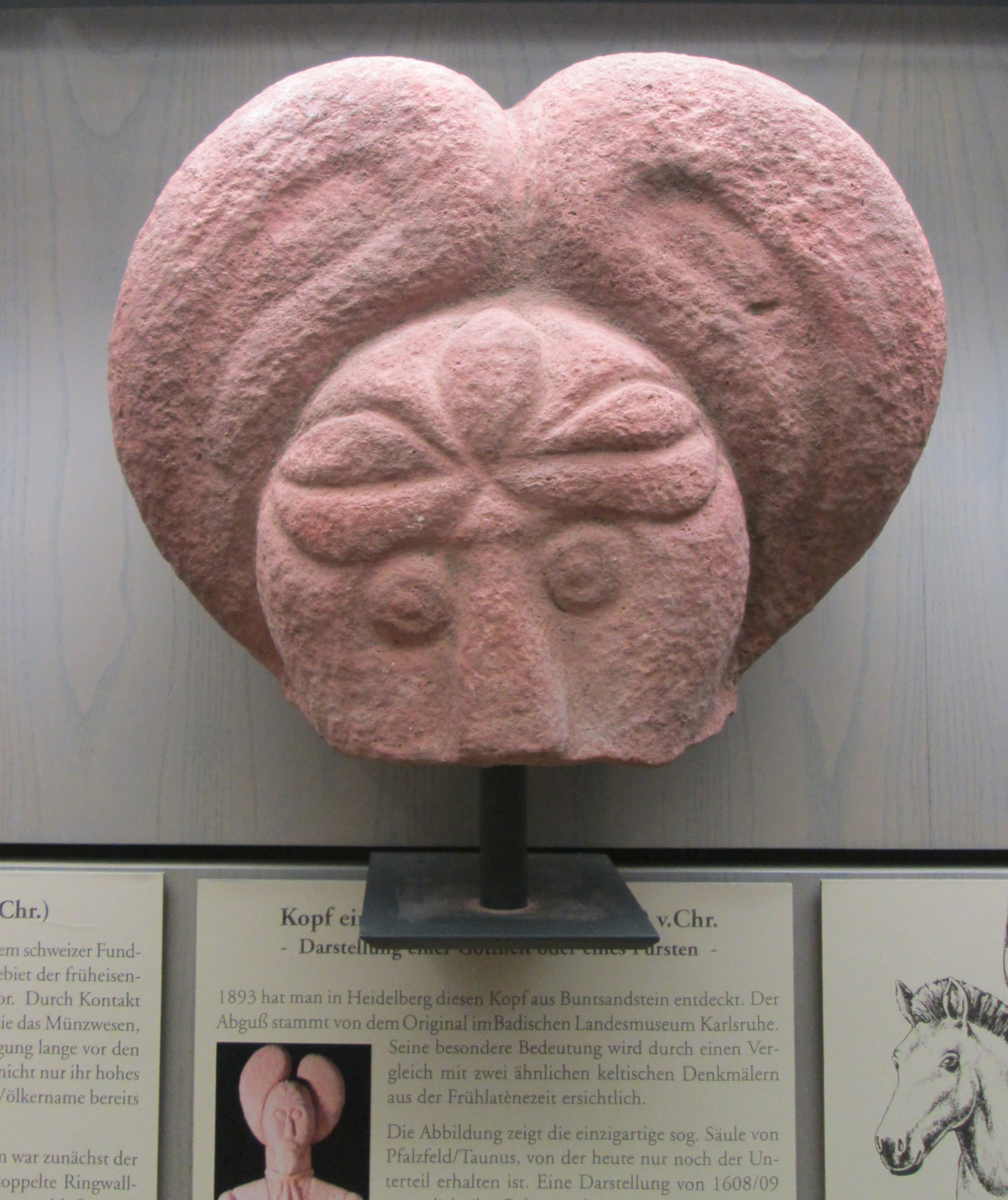
The Heidelberg head, Badisches Landesmuseum.

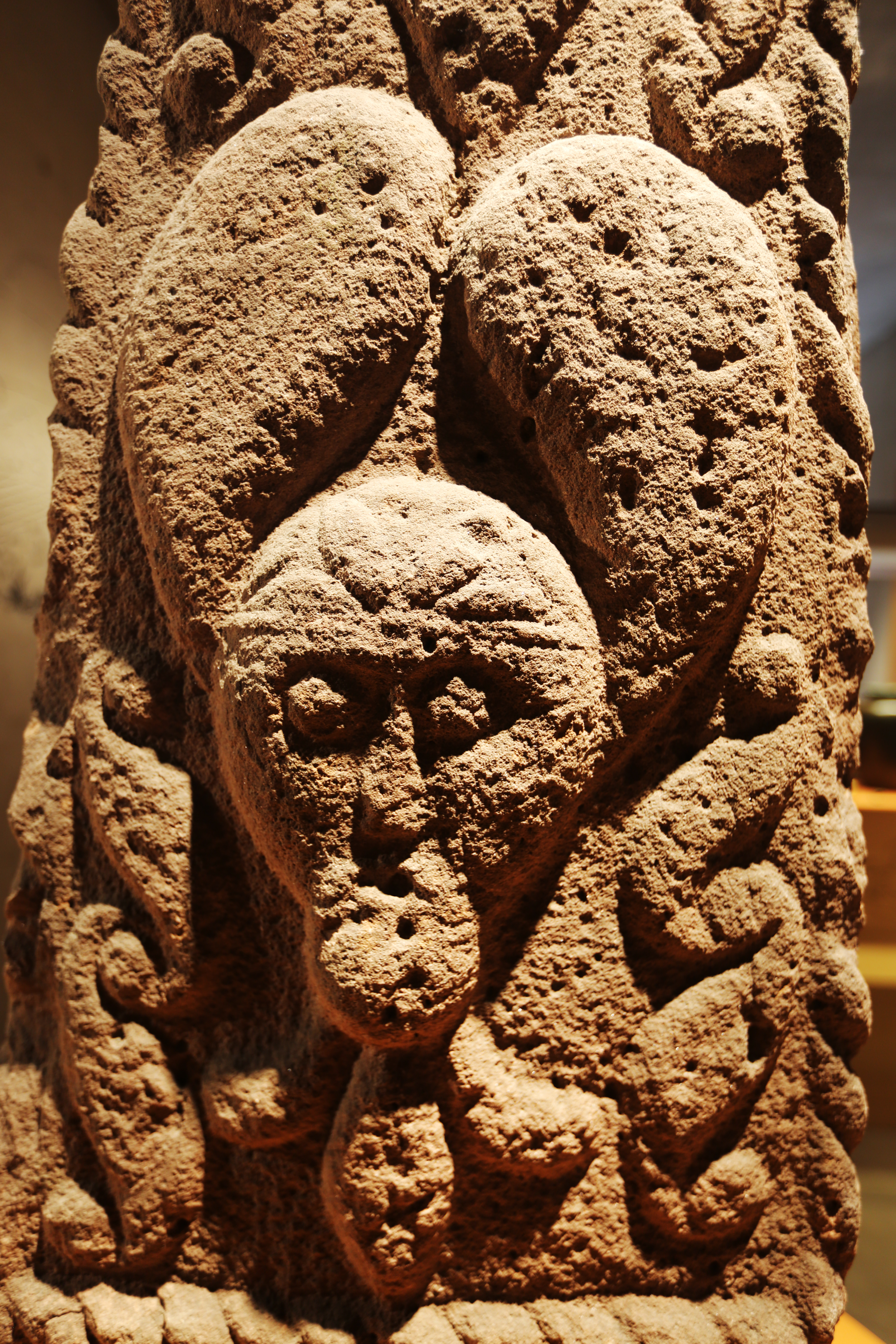
A head from the Pfalzfeld obelisk, Rheinisches Landesmuseum Bonn.

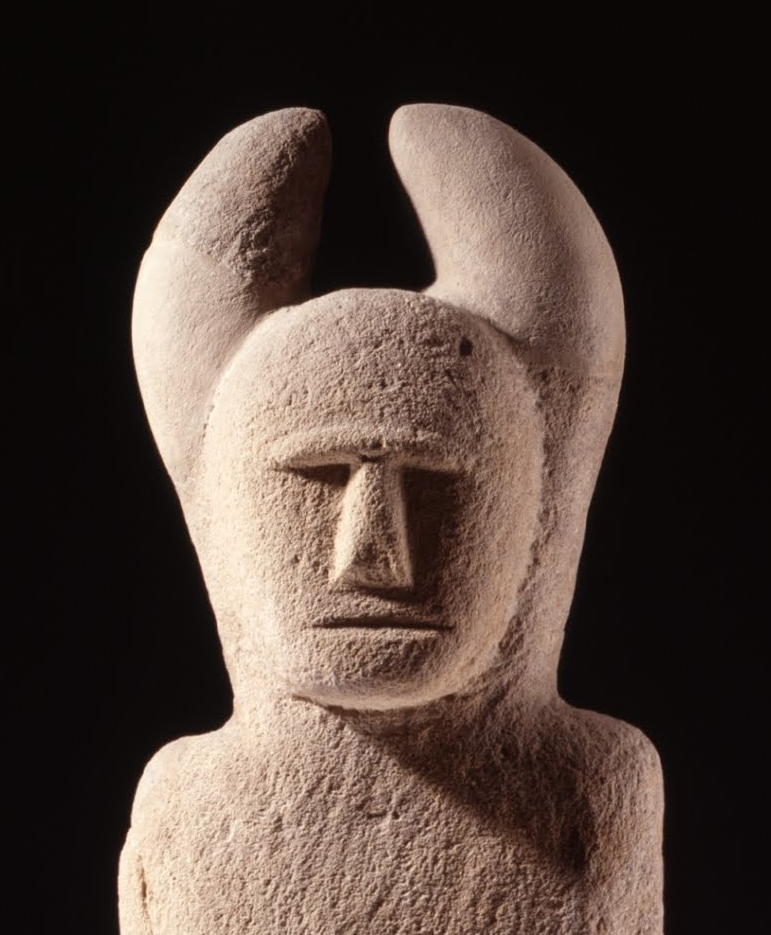
The head of the Holzgerlingen figure, Rheinisches Landesmuseum Bonn.

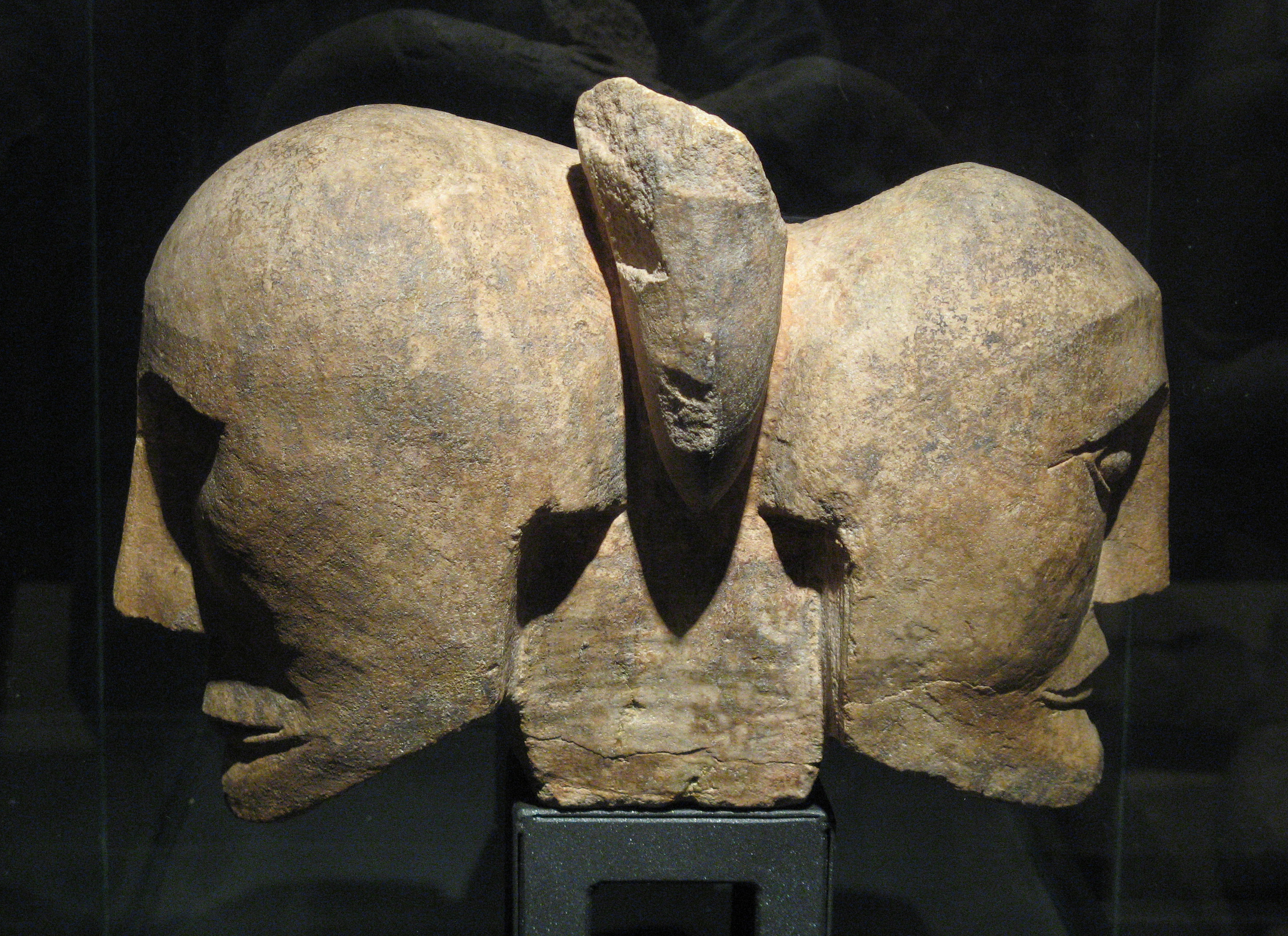
The two-headed sculpture from Roquepertuse, Museum of European and Mediterranean Civilisations.

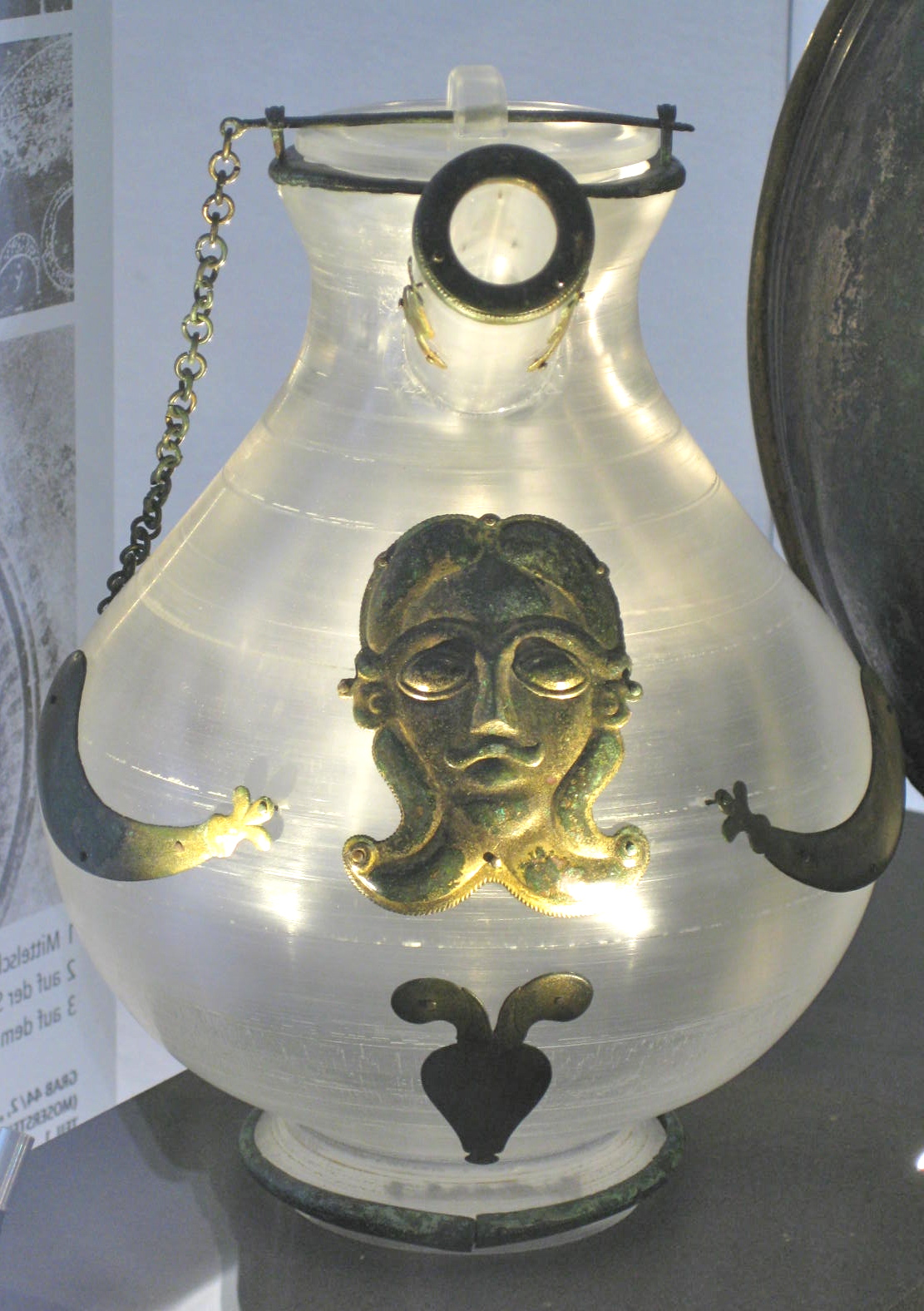
A jug from Moserstein, Keltenmuseum.

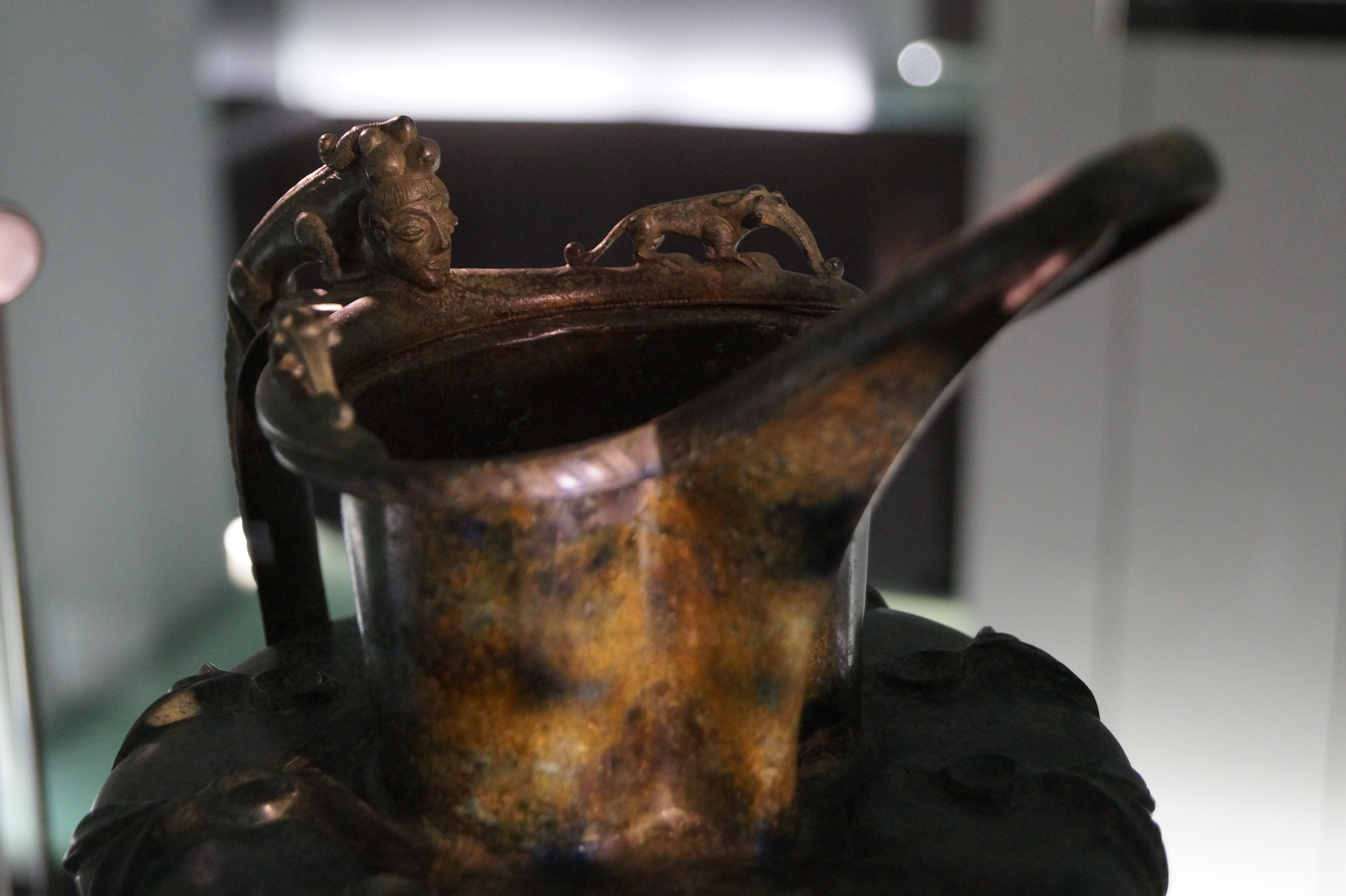
A face on the lip of the Dürrnberg beaked jug, Keltenmuseum.

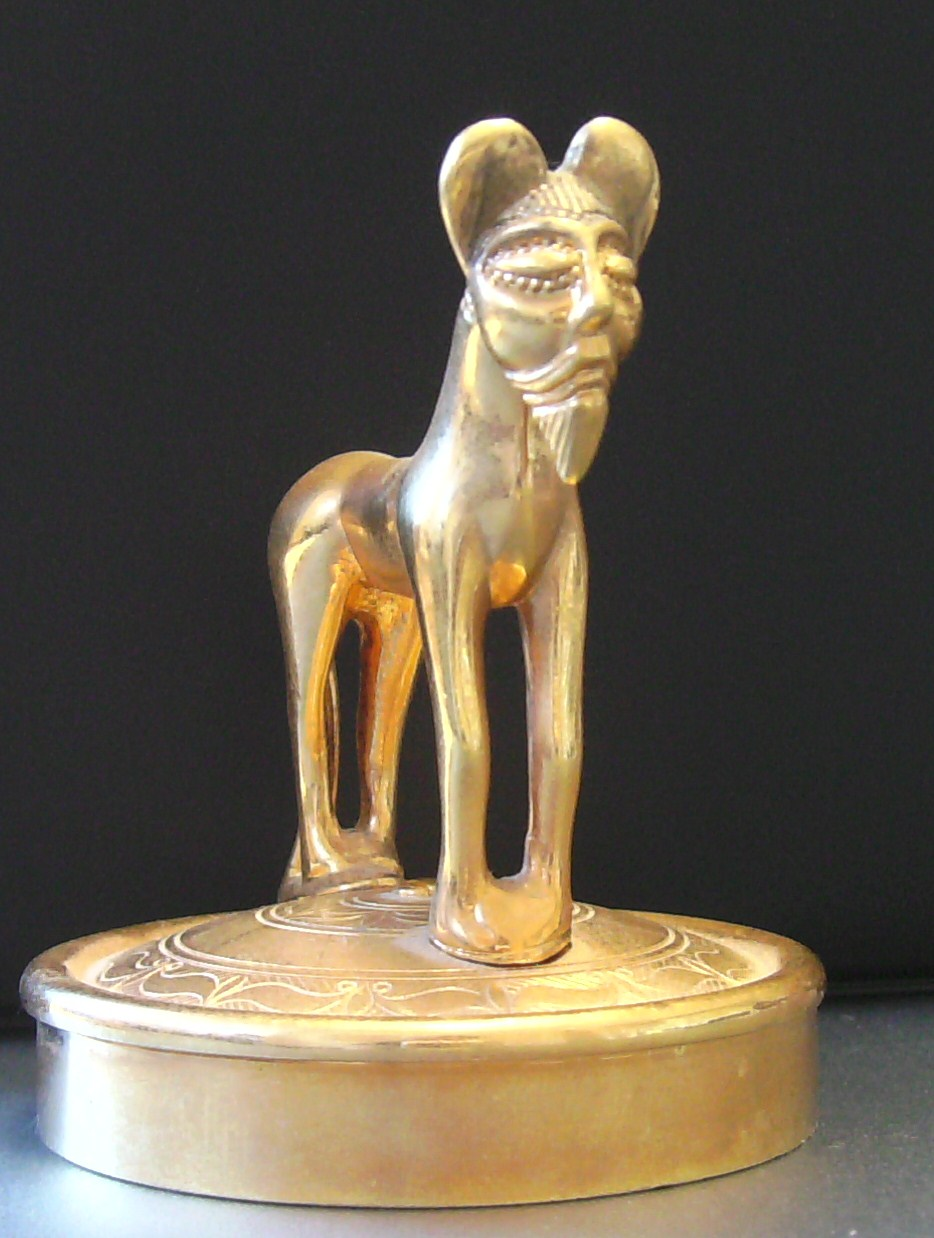
An anthropomorphic horse on the lid of a bronze flagon from Reinheim, European Archaeological Park of Bliesbruck-Reinheim.

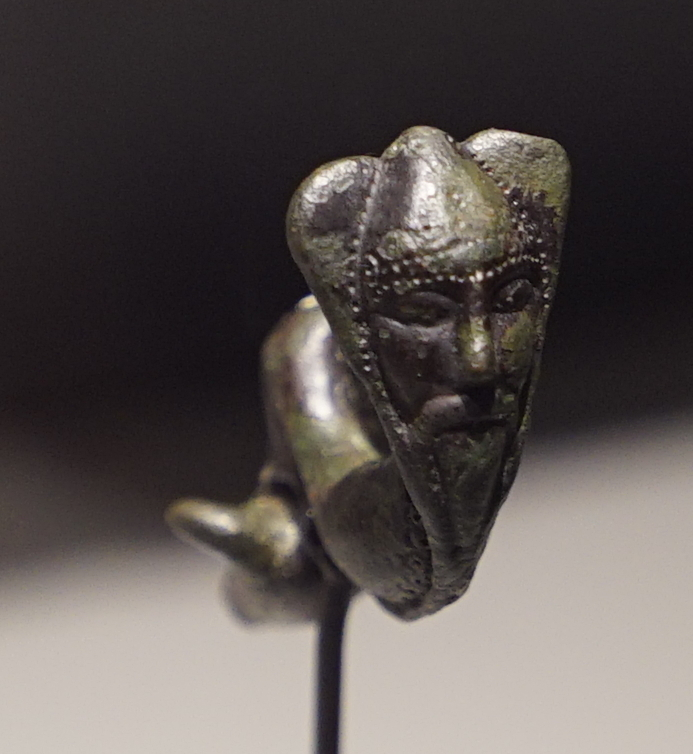
A copper fibula from Gué de la Marne, Musée d'Épernay.

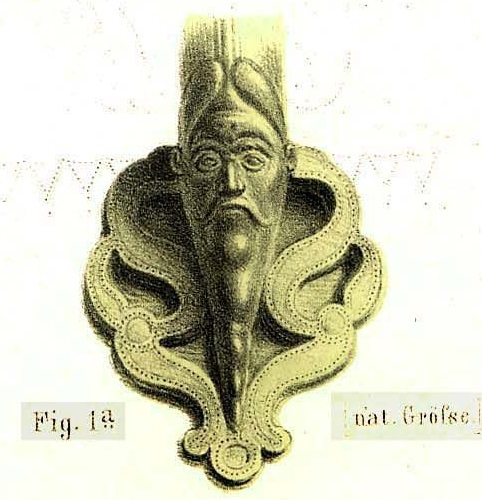
A head at the base of the handle of the Waldalgesheim flagon, Rheinisches Landesmuseum Bonn.

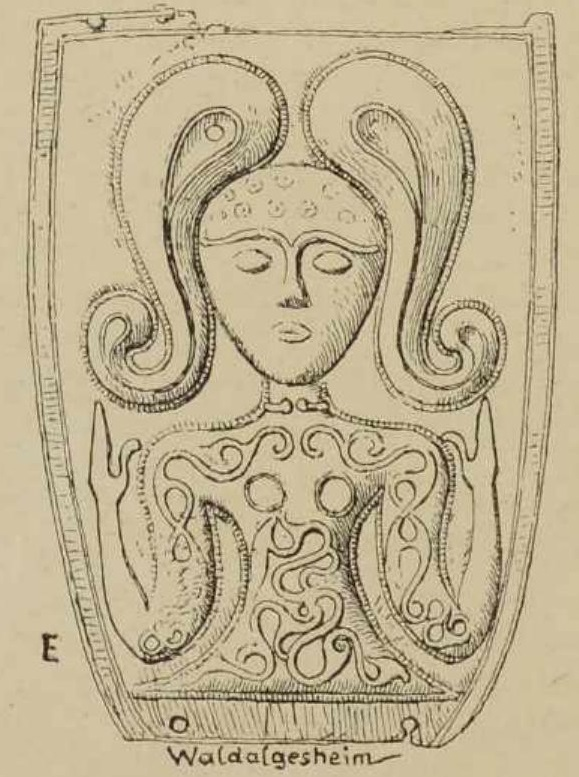
A reconstruction of the fragmentary bronze plates from the Waldalgesheim chariot, Rheinisches Landesmuseum Bonn.

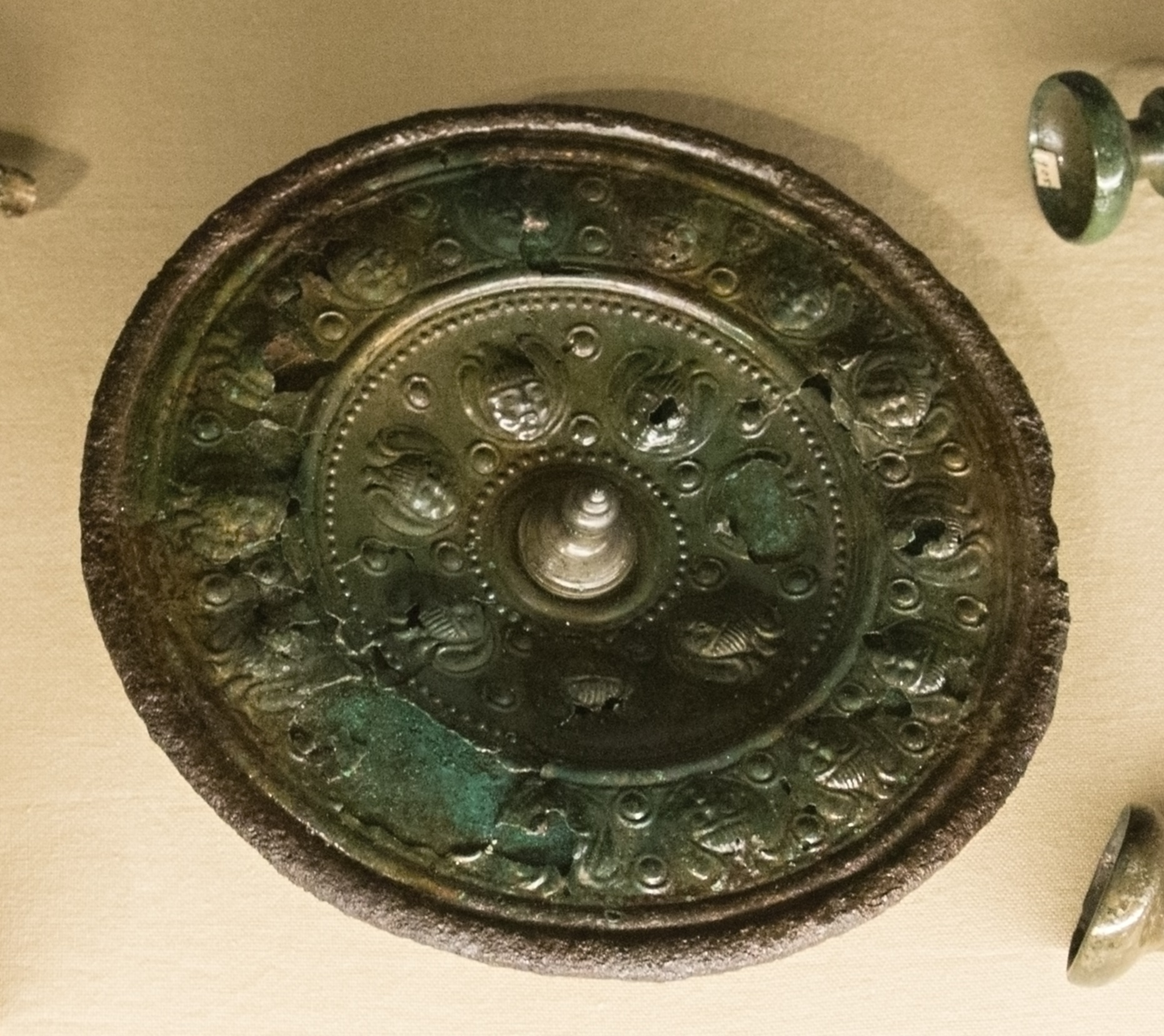
A bronze phalera found in Hořovičky, National Museum (Prague).<ref name='Green'>

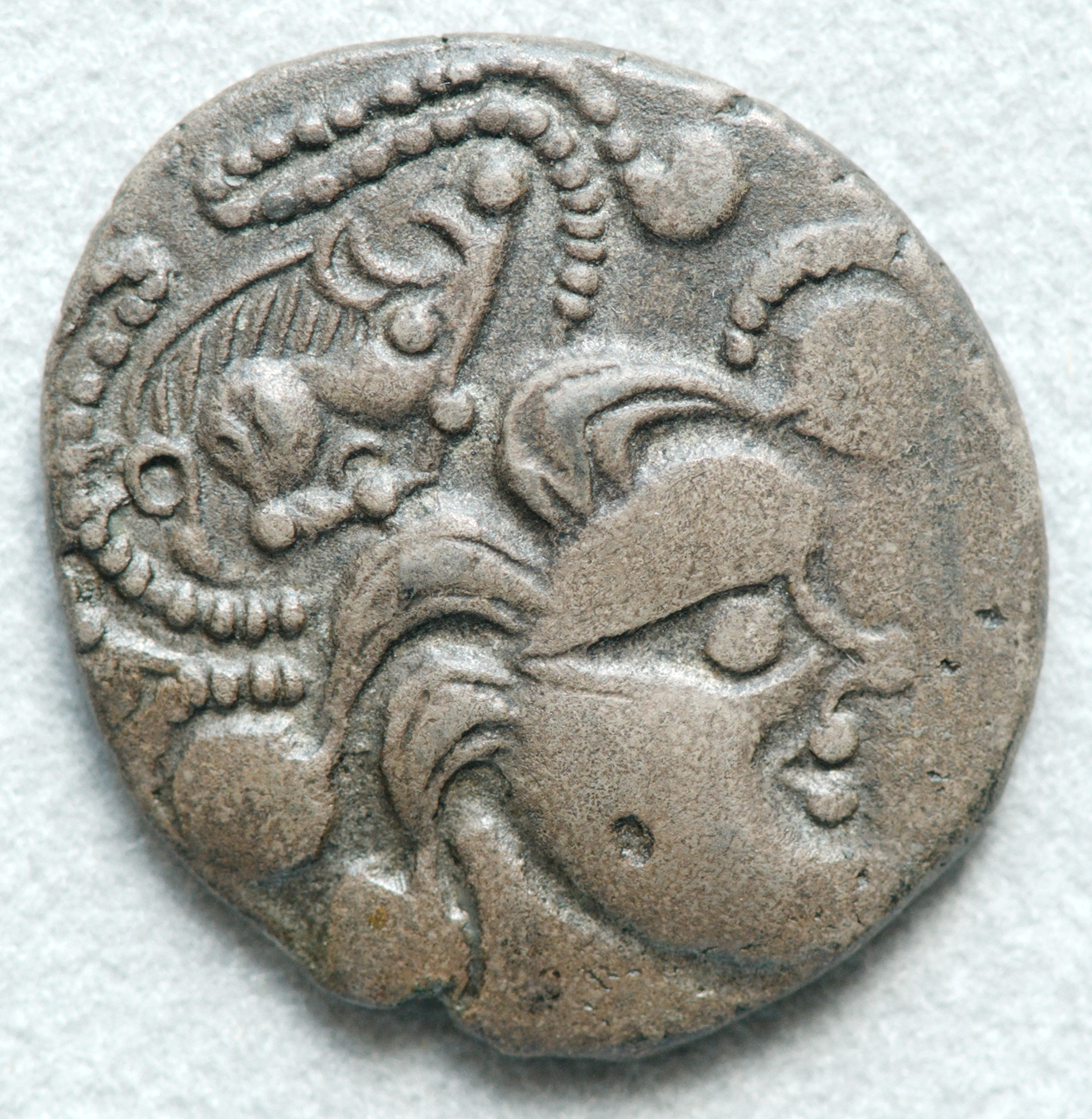
A stater of the Bodiocasses, BnF Museum.

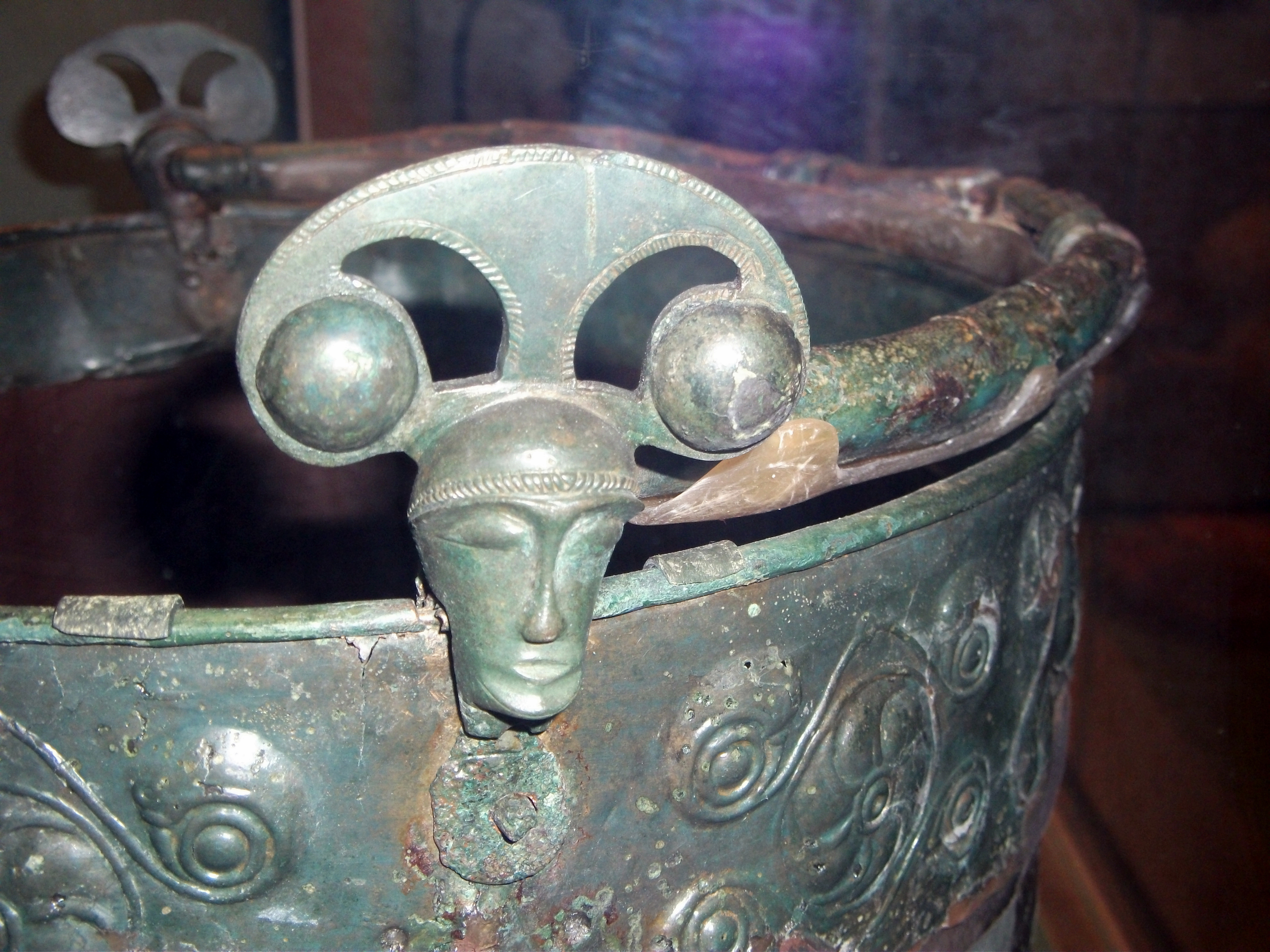
A copper head on the Aylesford bucket, British Museum.
