= Pfalzfeld obelisk =

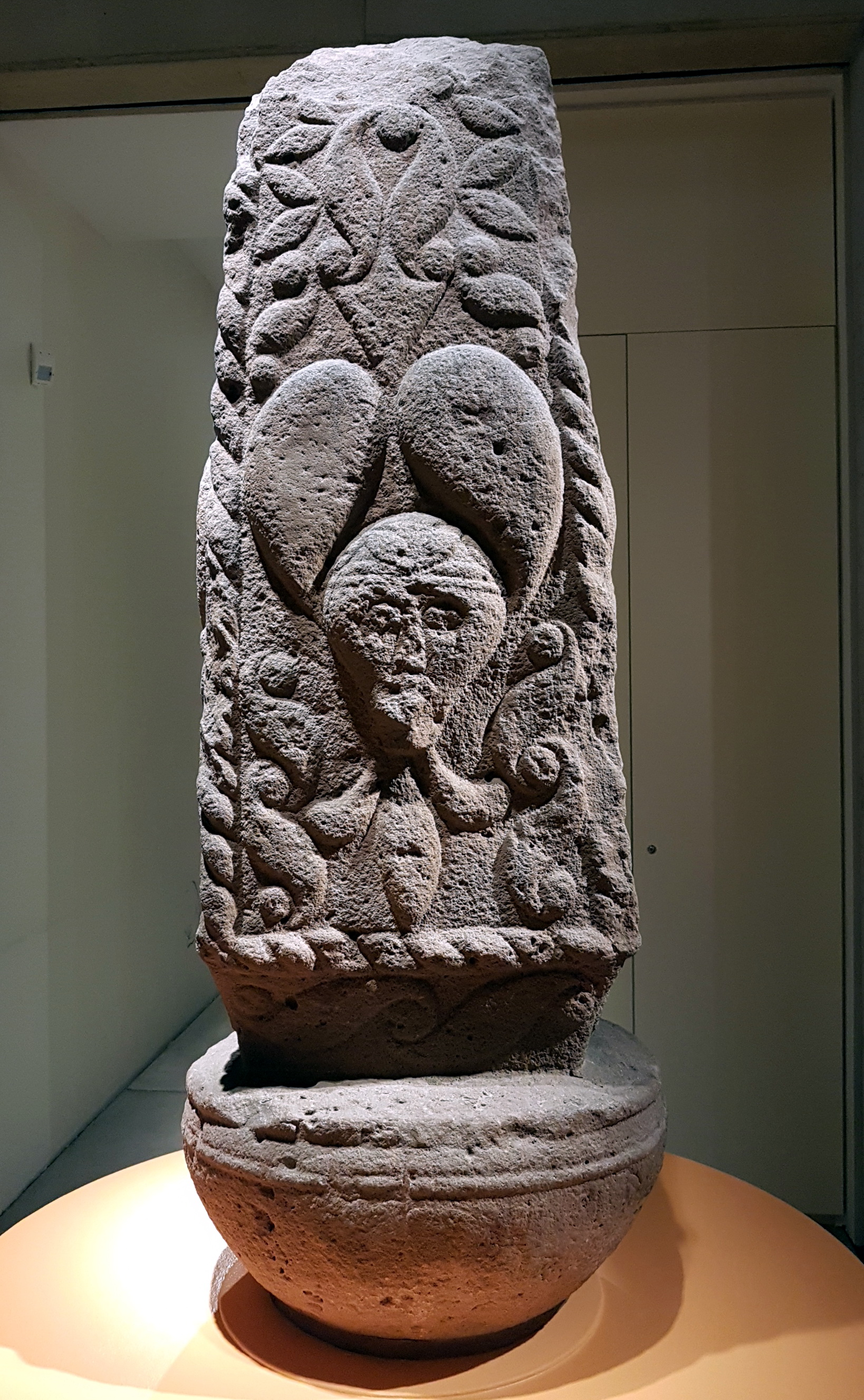
The Pfalzfeld obelisk, Side A. (Note: Designation of sides after Hans-Eckart Joachim's article.)

The Pfalzfeld obelisk (German: Pfalzfeld Säule or Flammensäule) is a Celtic carved sandstone monument, an example of the sculpture of the Iron Age La Tène culture. The obelisk, removed from its original site to the churchyard of Pfalzfeld, is believed to have been a funerary monument from one of the nearby burial grounds. The obelisk has been dated to the 4th or 5th century BC. It is currently in the collection of the Rheinisches Landesmuseum Bonn.

== Archaeological context and later history ==
There is no concrete indication of the stone's original location. The heads on the Pfalzfeld obelisk are stylistically and materially similar to the fragmentary sandstone head uncovered at Heidelberg, which may suggest they came from the same workshop, in which case the obelisk probably originated in the Odenwald. The stone has been identified as within the stylistic bounds of the Iron Age La Tène culture. Near Pfalzfeld are multiple burial grounds, identified as belonging to the early Hunsrück-Eifel culture, from which the obelisk could have been removed.

The first record of the stone is a drawing (described by archaeologist Hans-Eckart Joachim as "astonishingly careful" (Note: Original German: "erstaunlich sorgfältig".)) on a 1608/09 map of the Rheinfels district by cartographer Wilhelm Dilich. Another drawing was made in 1739, this one much less accurate. German antiquarian Constantin Koenen has mentioned a drawing of about 1845. When Dilich drew it, the obelisk was in the churchyard of Pfalzfeld, though it is not thought to have originated there. Antiquarians in the 18th century apparently believed it to be a Roman tombstone. Some futile excavations were carried out in 1737 in search of the tomb. The obelisk was moved to St Goar in 1737; moved to Koblenz in 1805; moved to the border of St Goar and Pfalzfeld in 1807; then to the cemetery of St Goar in 1845; and finally, to a room in Rheinfels Castle in 1932. In 1938, it was gifted to the Rheinisches Landesmuseum Bonn, where it remains today. The obelisk is now featured on the coat of arms of the municipality of Pfalzfeld.

In the 1608/09 drawing, the height of the stele from the round base up appears to have been about 2.20m. In the 1739 drawing it was 2m and the 1845 drawing apparently shows no major further loss of height. However, by 1901, when Koenen wrote about the obelisk, its height had been reduced to 1.48m. A portion of the base also seems to have broken off in this period. The stone therefore appears to have undergone significant damage in the latter half of the 19th century, caused by weathering in combination with frequent relocation. A witness in 1690, furthermore, related that the old people of Pfalzfeld recalled that the obelisk had originally had a human head on top of it, but that this head was torn down as idolatrous. The obelisk was perhaps crowned with a head similar to the Janus-faced Heidelberg head. Joachim estimates that originally the obelisk may have measured as much as 2.80m from the base and 3.50m altogether.

=== Gallery ===
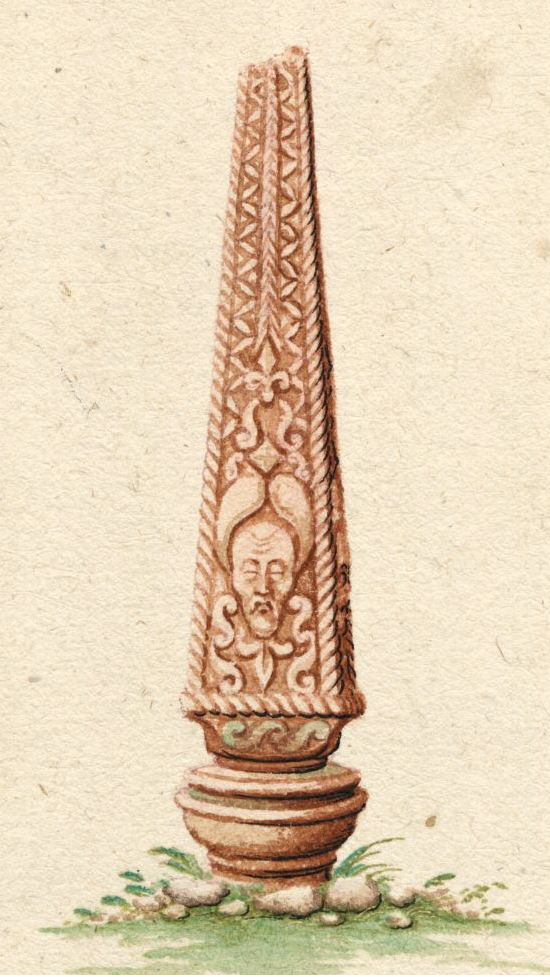
1608/09 drawing in the Dilich map

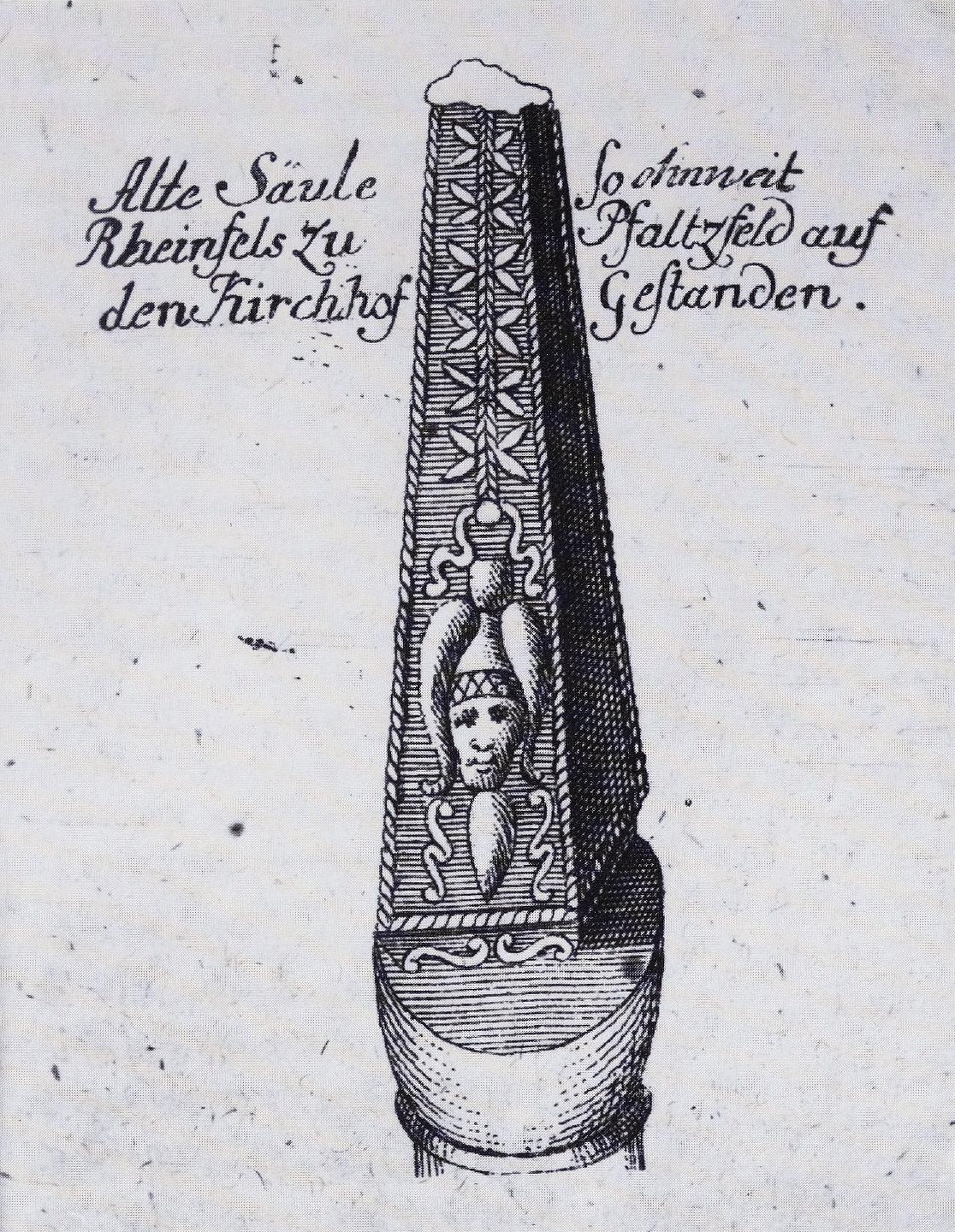
1739 drawing

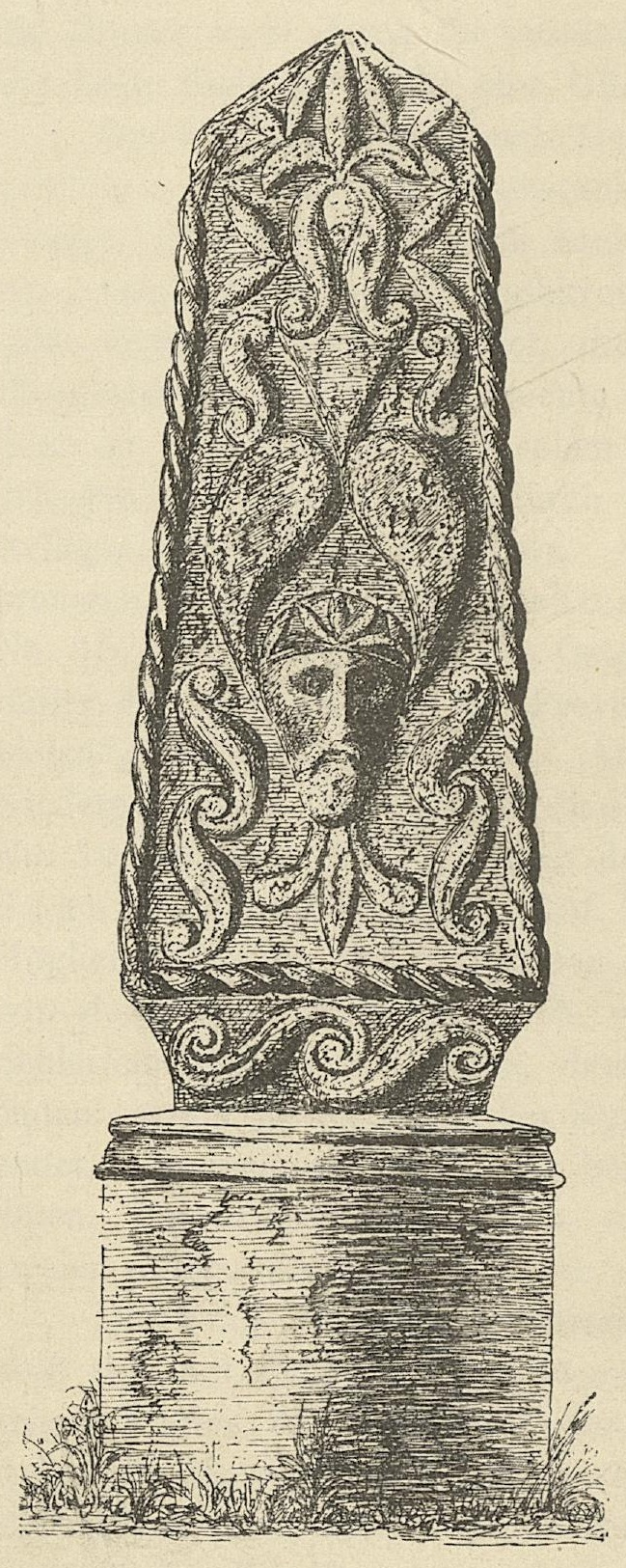
1901 drawing in Koenen's article (Note the incorrect base)

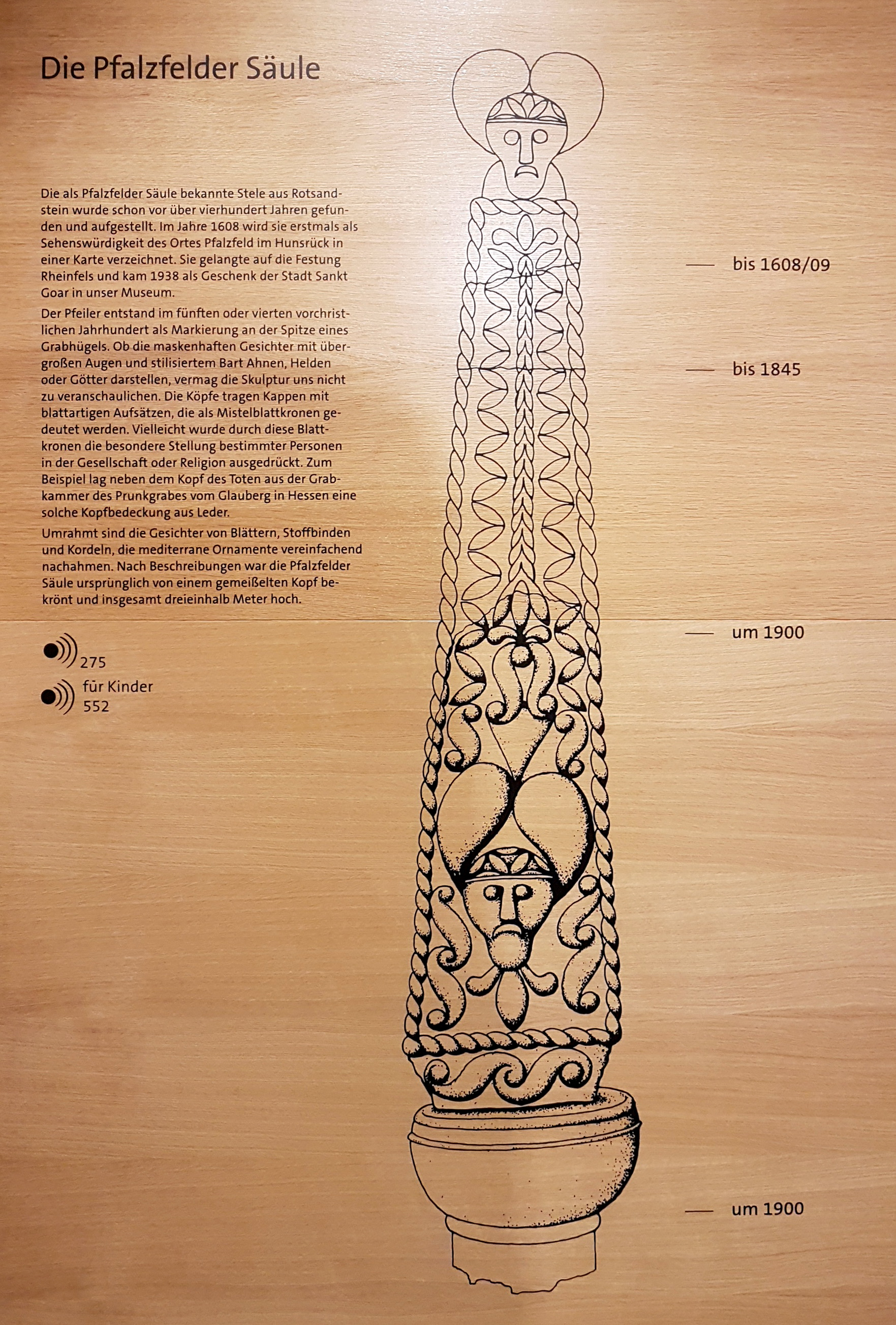
A diagram showing the deterioration of the obelisk (after Hans-Eckart Joachim)

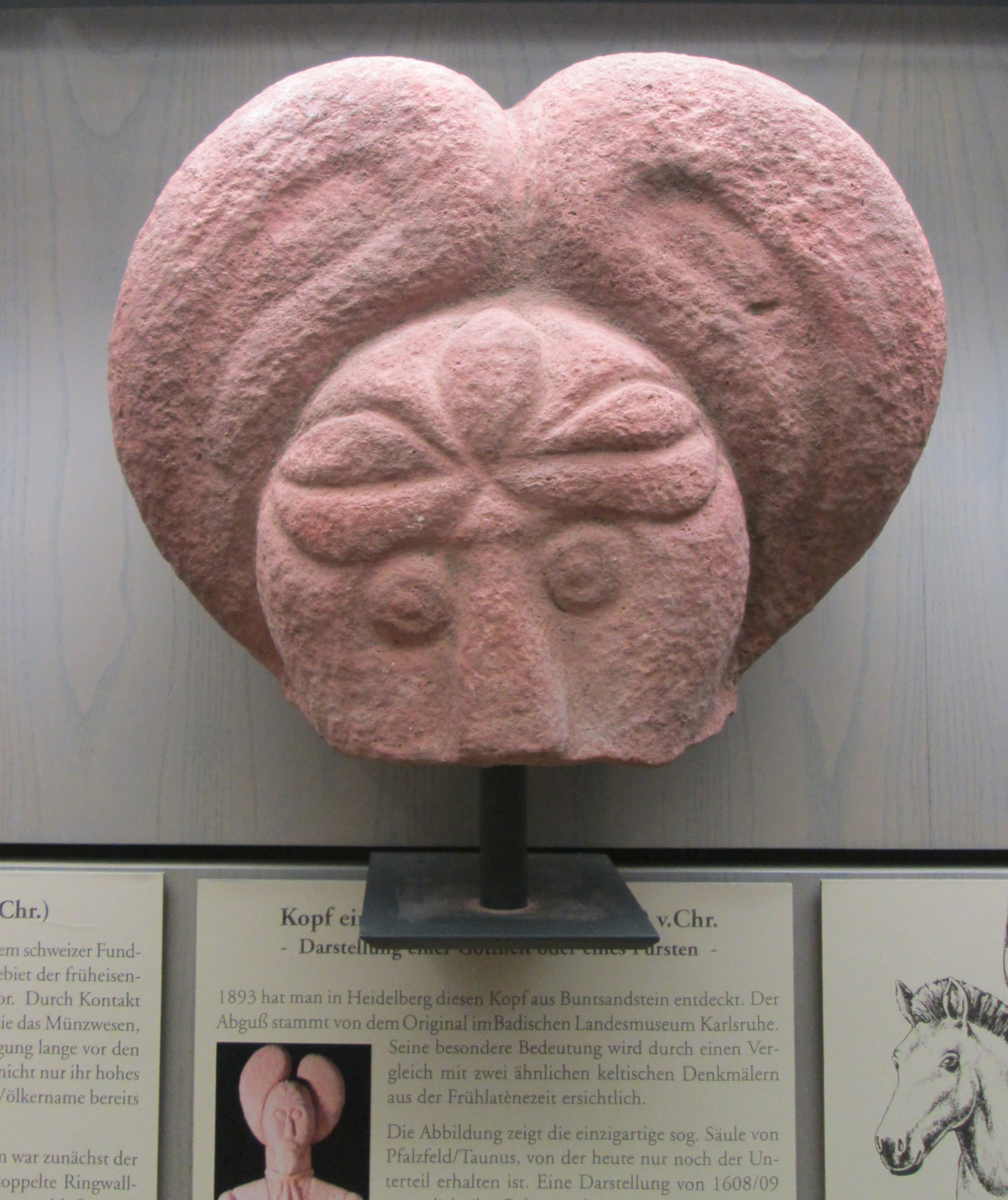
The Heidelberg head.

== Description ==
The Pfalzfeld obelisk is carved from a brown-violet quartz sandstone, probably sourced from the Saar-Nahe Basin. It measures 1.48m from the dome base. The diameter of the broken tip is 55.8cm. The diameter of the dome base is about 40cm. The obelisk has been dated to the 4th or 5th century BC.

The base of the obelisk is an overturned dome, perhaps originally buried underground for stability. The body of the obelisk is four-sided, rectangular, and tapers from the base. Each of the four sides is decorated. All four sides of the obelisk are carved with the same basic pattern, with slight differences in execution and the orientation of some elements. Near the base of the obelisk, a head is carved on each side. Visible are a moustache, a nose, eyes without pupils, and a narrow headband; no mouth is visible on any of the heads. The forehead of each face is marked with a lotus motif. Each head wears a Celtic leaf-crown (German: Blattkrone), made up of two asymmetrical teardrop-shaped leaves. Each head rests on a three-leafed design which archaeologist Ian Armit has described as "enigmatic". Joachim has identified them with beards; Michael J. Enright with tasselled torcs; and Armit with plinths upon which the heads (supposedly severed) rest. S-shaped swirls work their way up the obelisk symmetrically. The borders are rope-like, diagonally notched. At the very top, downwards-facing palmettes are visible.

=== Gallery ===
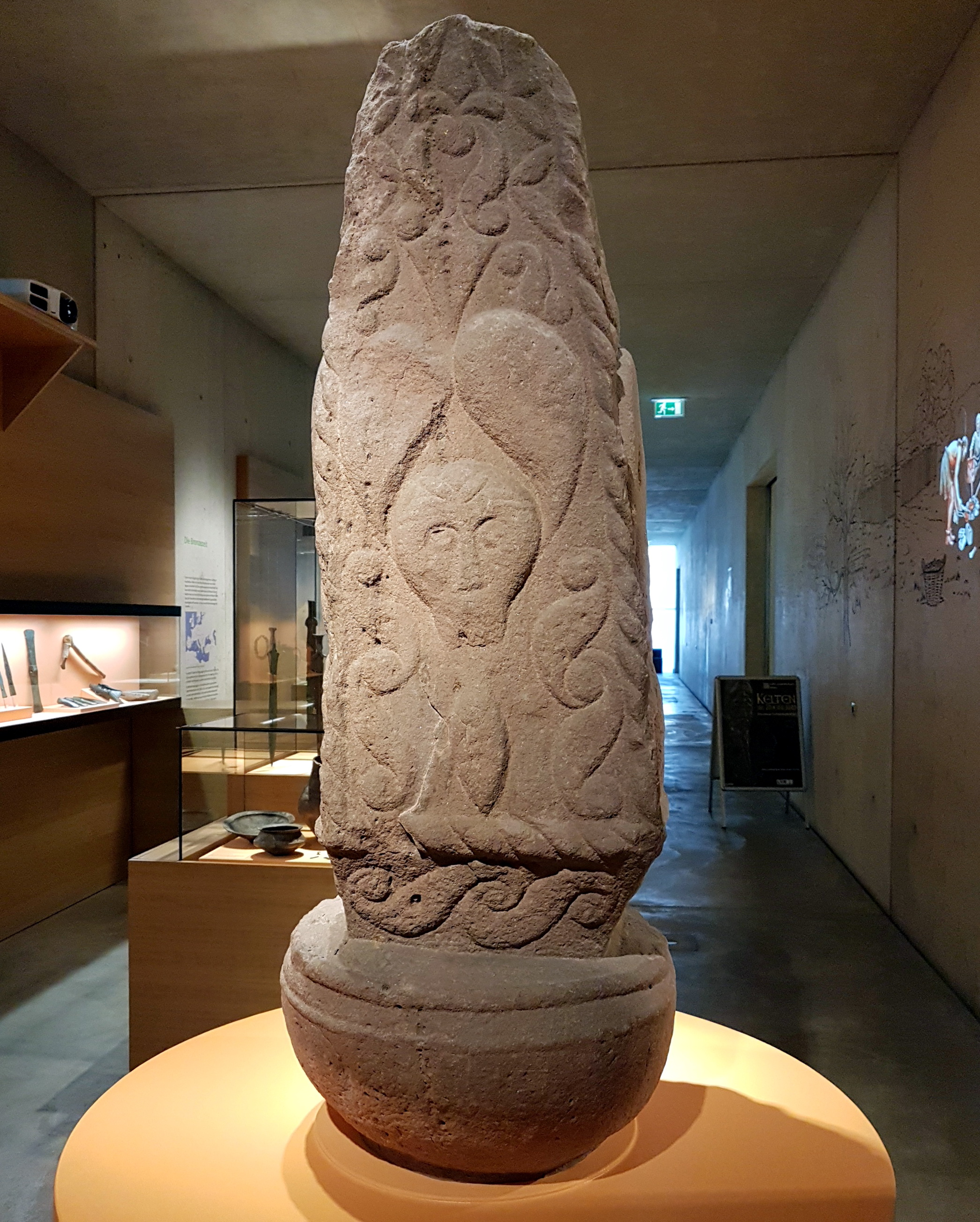
Side B

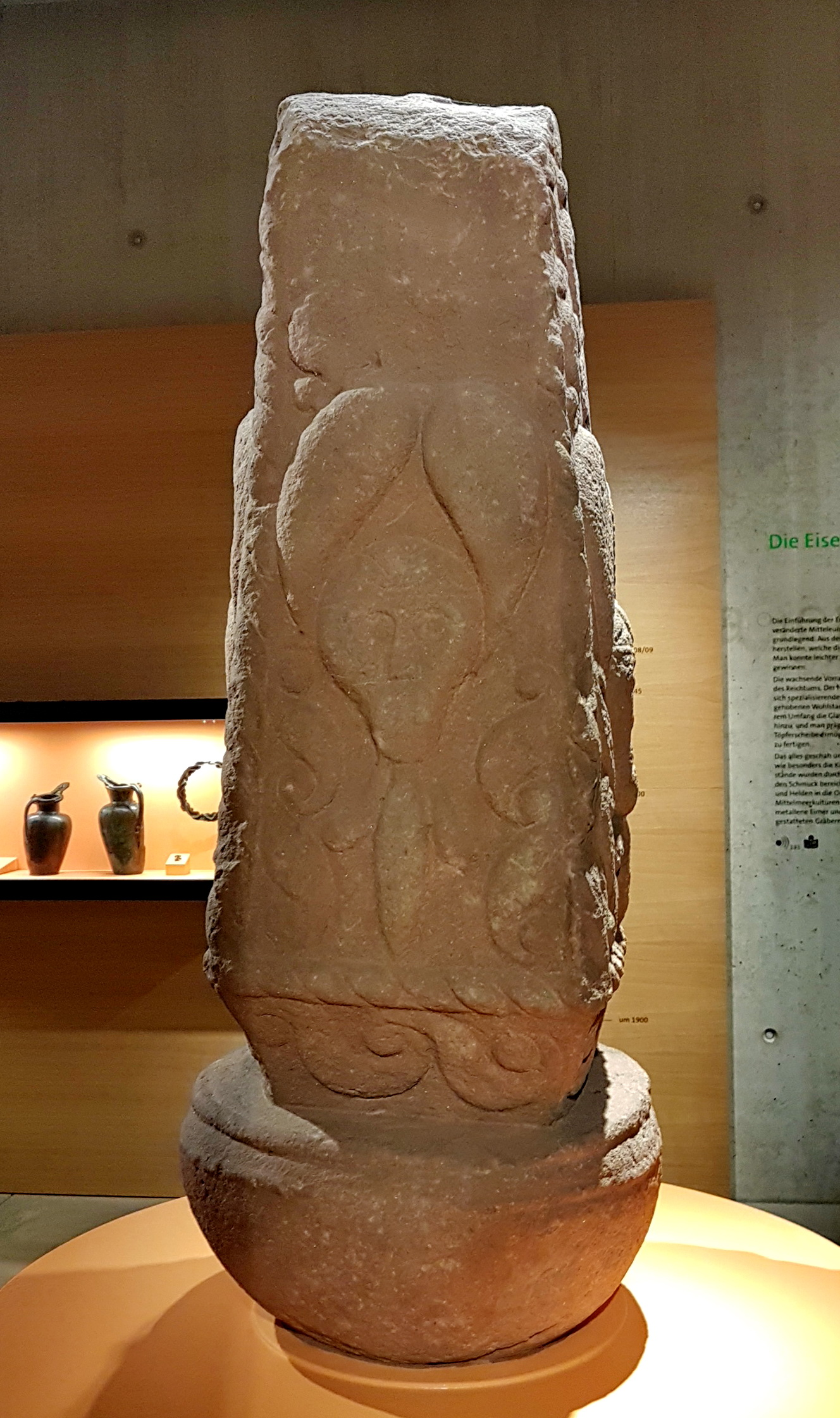
Side C

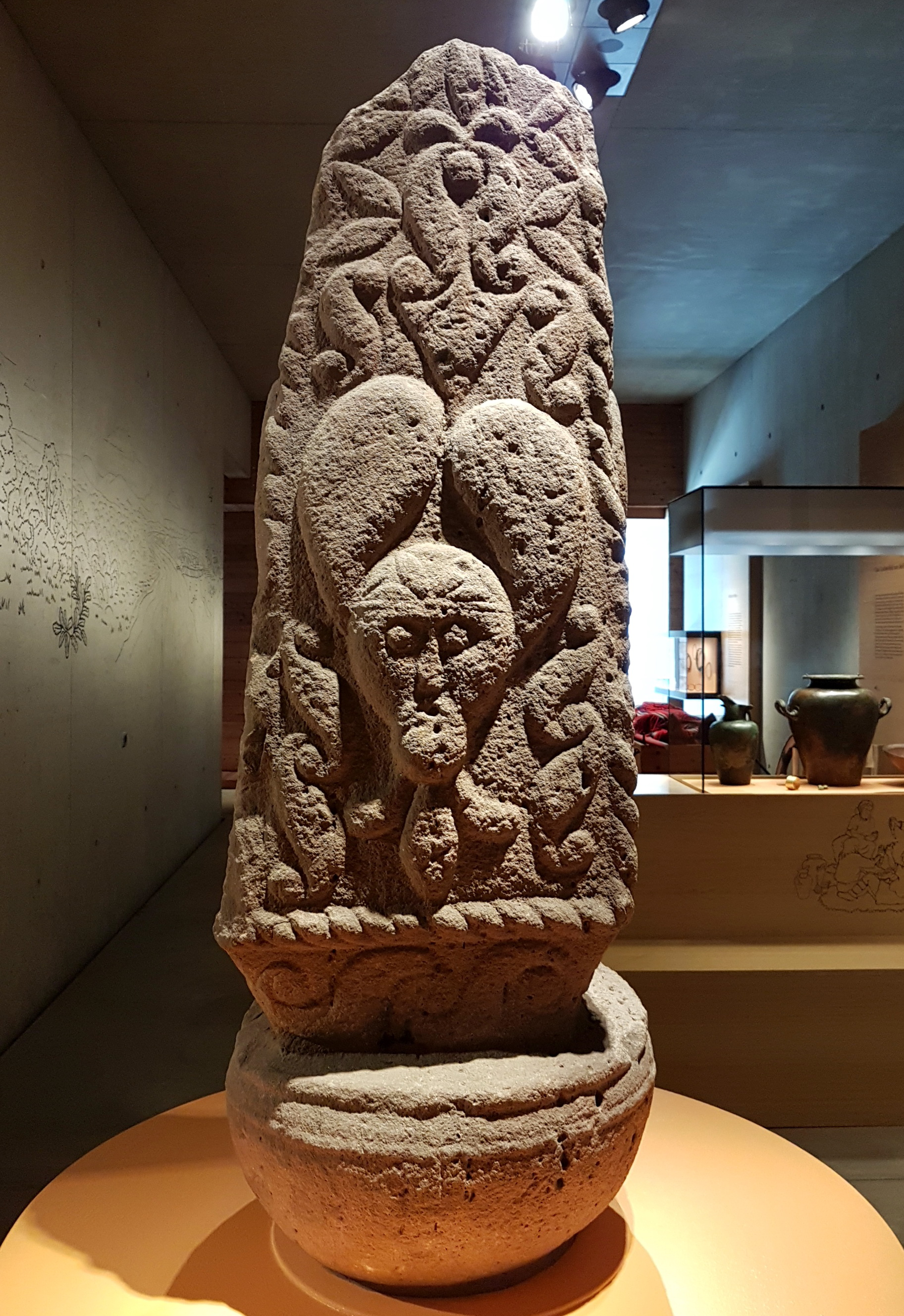
Side D

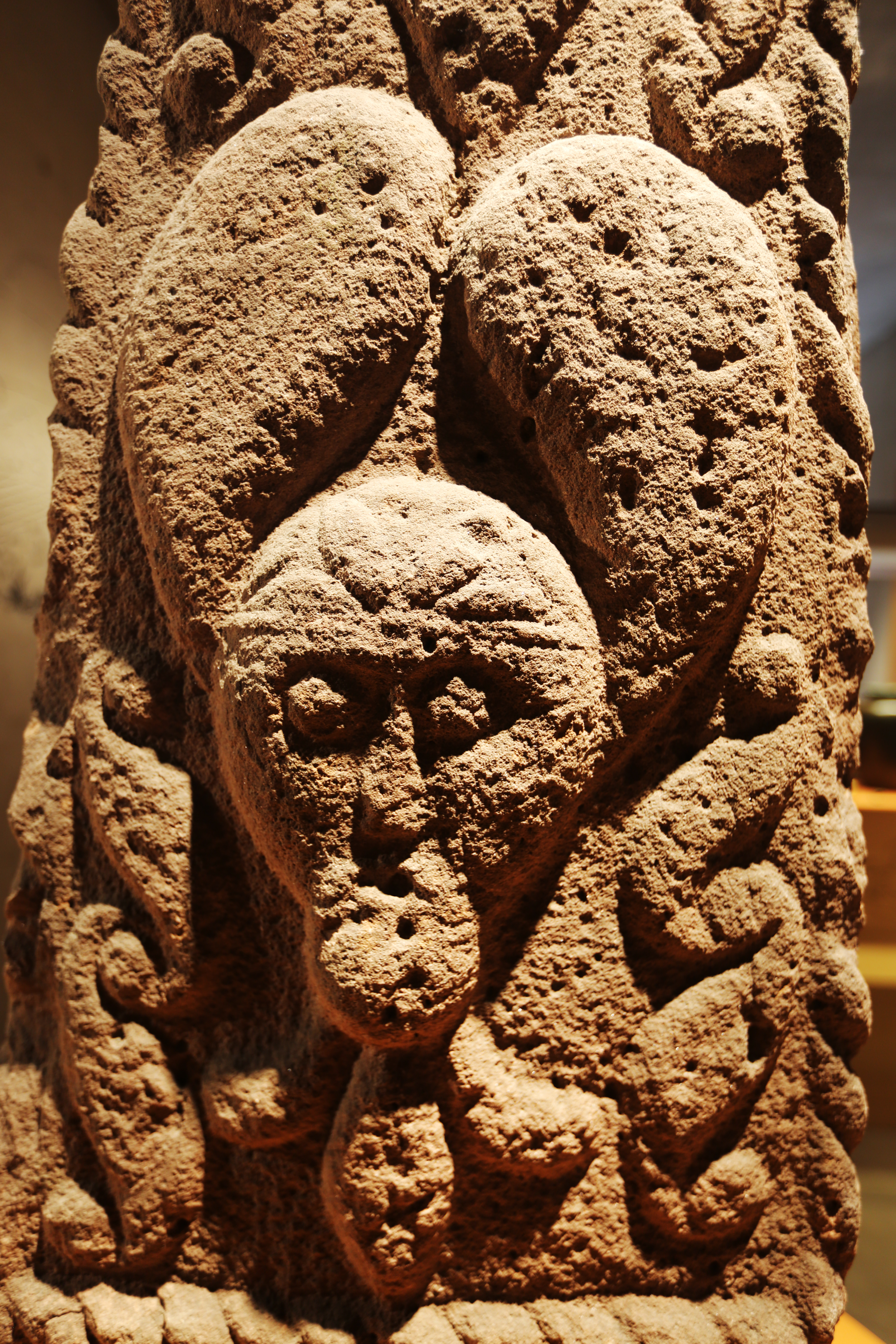
A detail of the carved face on Side D.

== Interpretation ==
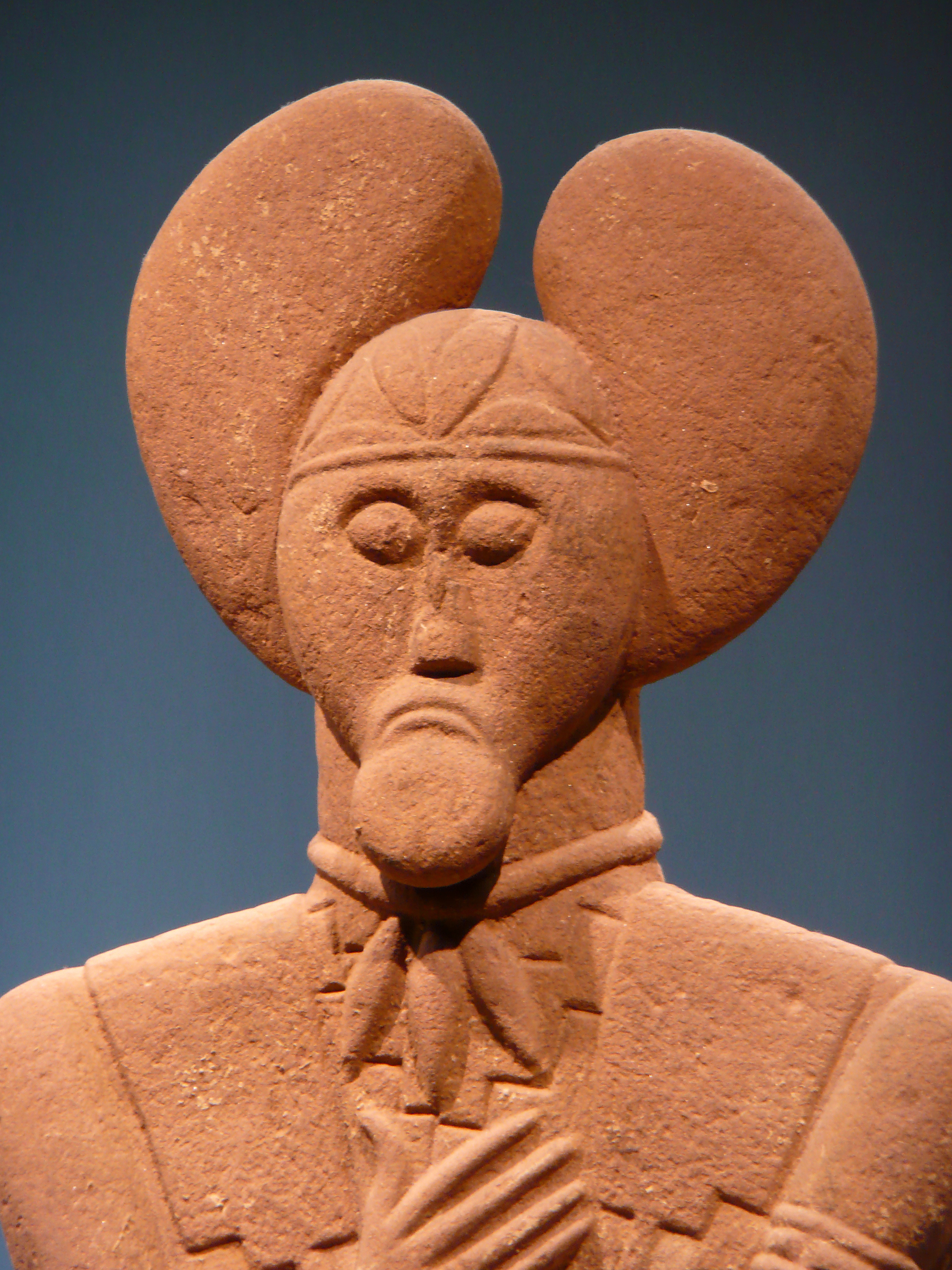
The asymmetric leaf-crown depicted on the obelisk bears a strong resemblance to that of the Glauberg prince statue.

The Pfalzfeld obelisk is widely thought to have been a funerary monument due to its proximity to several Iron Age burial grounds.

Several stylistic analogues within the La Tène culture have been noted. Other heads with leaf-crowns and moustaches are known, such as the Heidelberg head and the Glauberg prince, who wears a very similarly executed leaf-crown. However, among these examples, faces without mouths are not represented. For analogues to this feature, Ian Armit has cited the Entremont head pillar. More broadly, the obelisk exhibits the very common Celtic head motif. Armit has conjectured that designs below the heads are supposed to represent plints upon which severed heads were placed, which would tie them into the Celtic cult of the severed head. No other Celtic stone monuments are known with an obelisk shape (that is, slender and tapered). Furthermore, the S-shaped curls which decorate the obelisk are unknown within the early La Tène culture. Etruscan influence has been supposed (the rope-like border, for example, resembles those found on contemporaneous Etruscan cippi) but, overall, the stone's design seems to have been little influenced by Mediterranean developments.

Some scholars have suggested that the obelisk was intended as a phallic symbol, with the dome base identifiable with the phallus's glans Celticist Anne Ross, for example, thought the obelisk was influenced by Etruscan phallic tombstones. Few explicitly sexual motifs are known in Celtic art, (Note: Monumental phalluses in Celtic art are rare, but not unknown. There is the ithyphallic Hirschlanden warrior and a 1.78m stone found in Irlich is explicitly in the shape of a phallus.) though Armit has entertained the idea on the basis that the Celtic head motif was "bound up in wider concepts of fertility and renewal."
