= Pfalzfeld =

- Municipality
- Coat of arms

- Location of Pfalzfeld within Rhein-Hunsrück-Kreis district
- Interactive map of Pfalzfeld
- Location within Germany Location within Rhineland-Palatinate
- Coordinates: 50°6′50″N 7°34′46″E
- Country: Germany
- State: Rhineland-Palatinate
- District: Rhein-Hunsrück-Kreis
- Municipal assoc.: Hunsrück-Mittelrhein
- Subdivisions: 2

Government
  - Mayor (2019–24): Rainer Steeg

Area
  - Total: 5.27 km^{2} (2.03 sq mi)
- Elevation: 440 m (1,440 ft)

Population (2025-12-31)
  - Total: 635
  - Density: 120/km^{2} (312/sq mi)
- Time zone: UTC+01:00 (CET)
  - Summer (DST): UTC+02:00 (CEST)
- Postal codes: 56291
- Dialling codes: 06746
- Vehicle registration: SIM
- Website: www.pfalzfeld.de

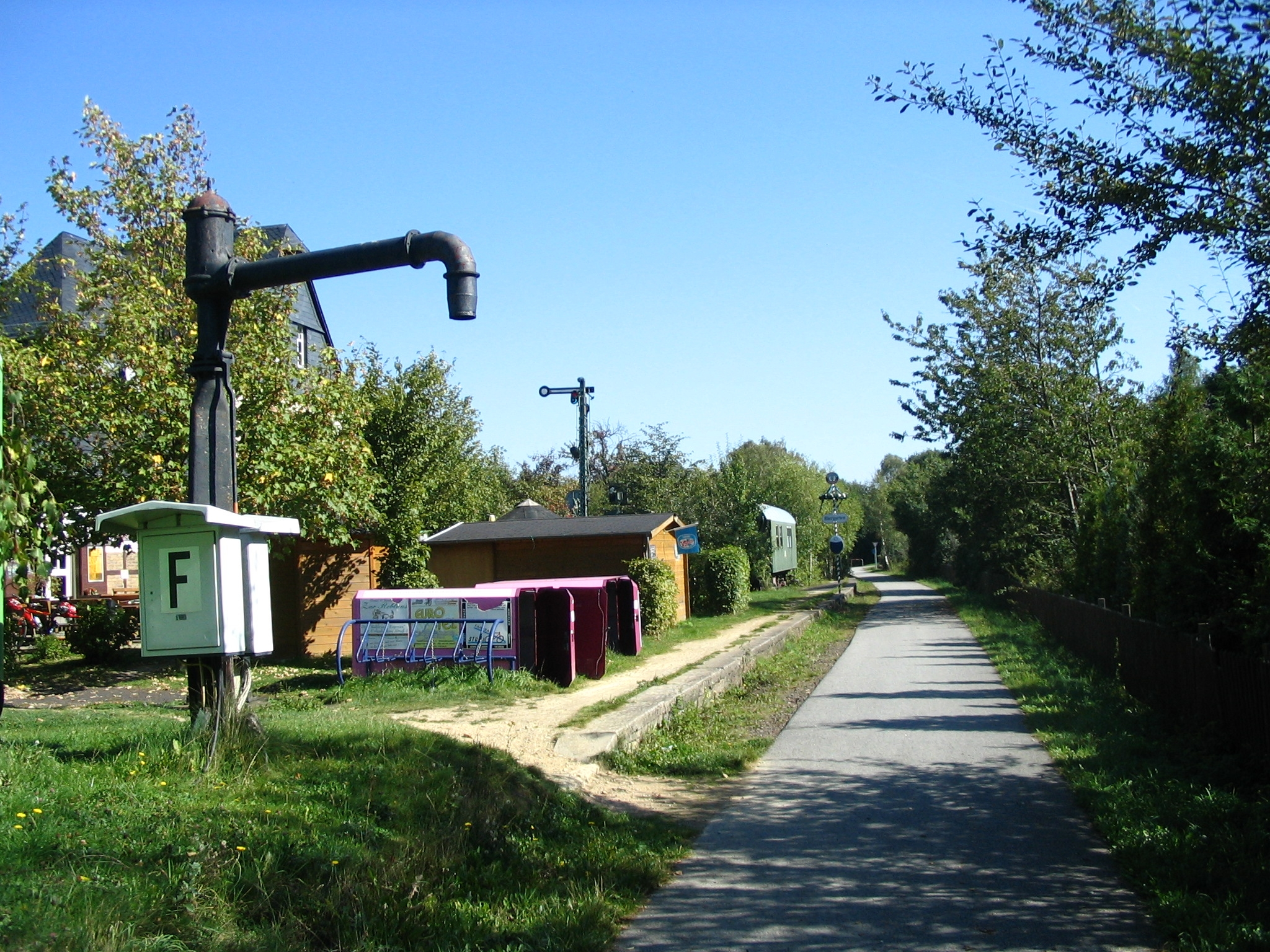
Schinderhannes-Radweg (cycle path) in the Pfalzfeld area, railway station

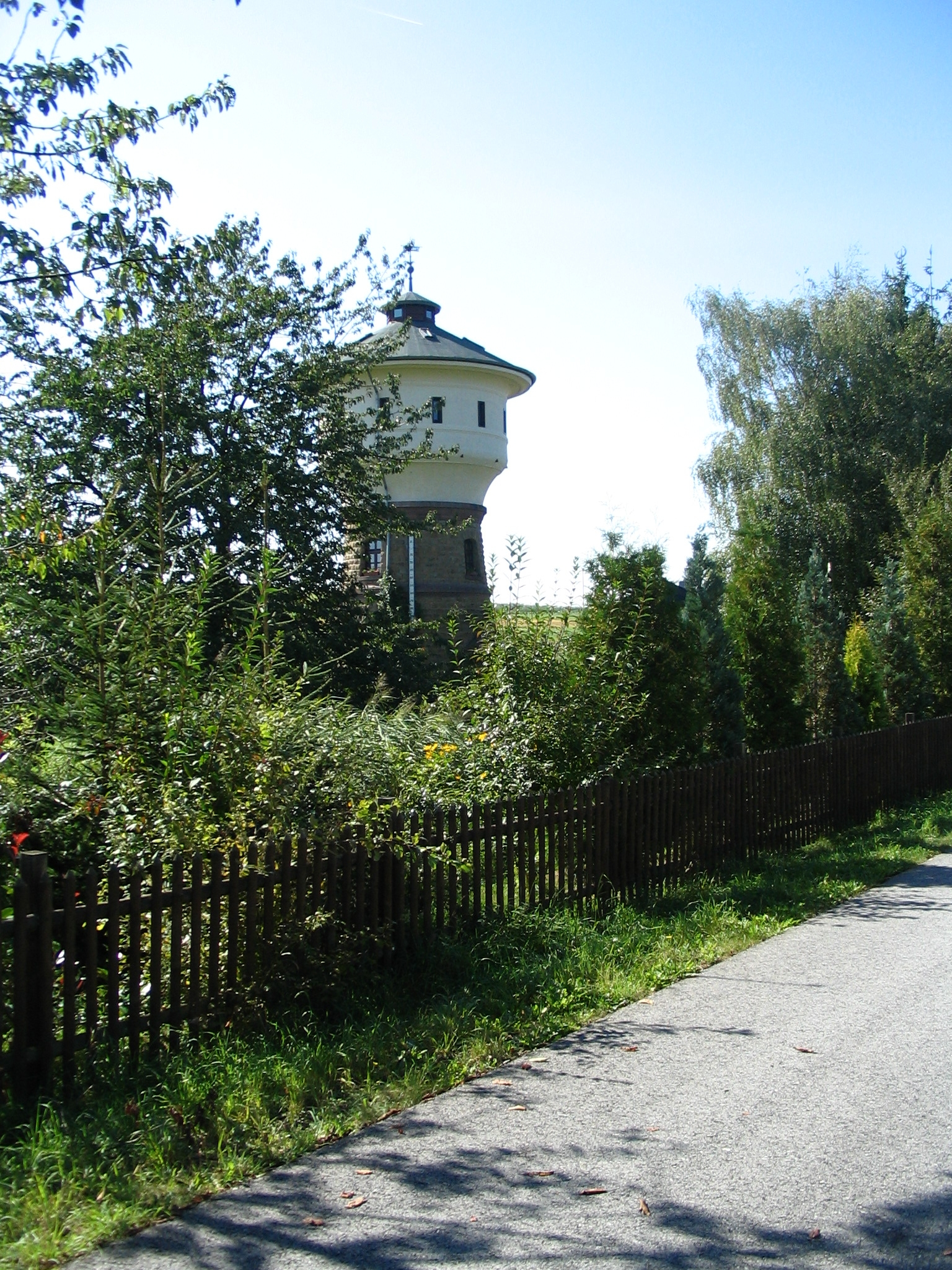
Historical watertower

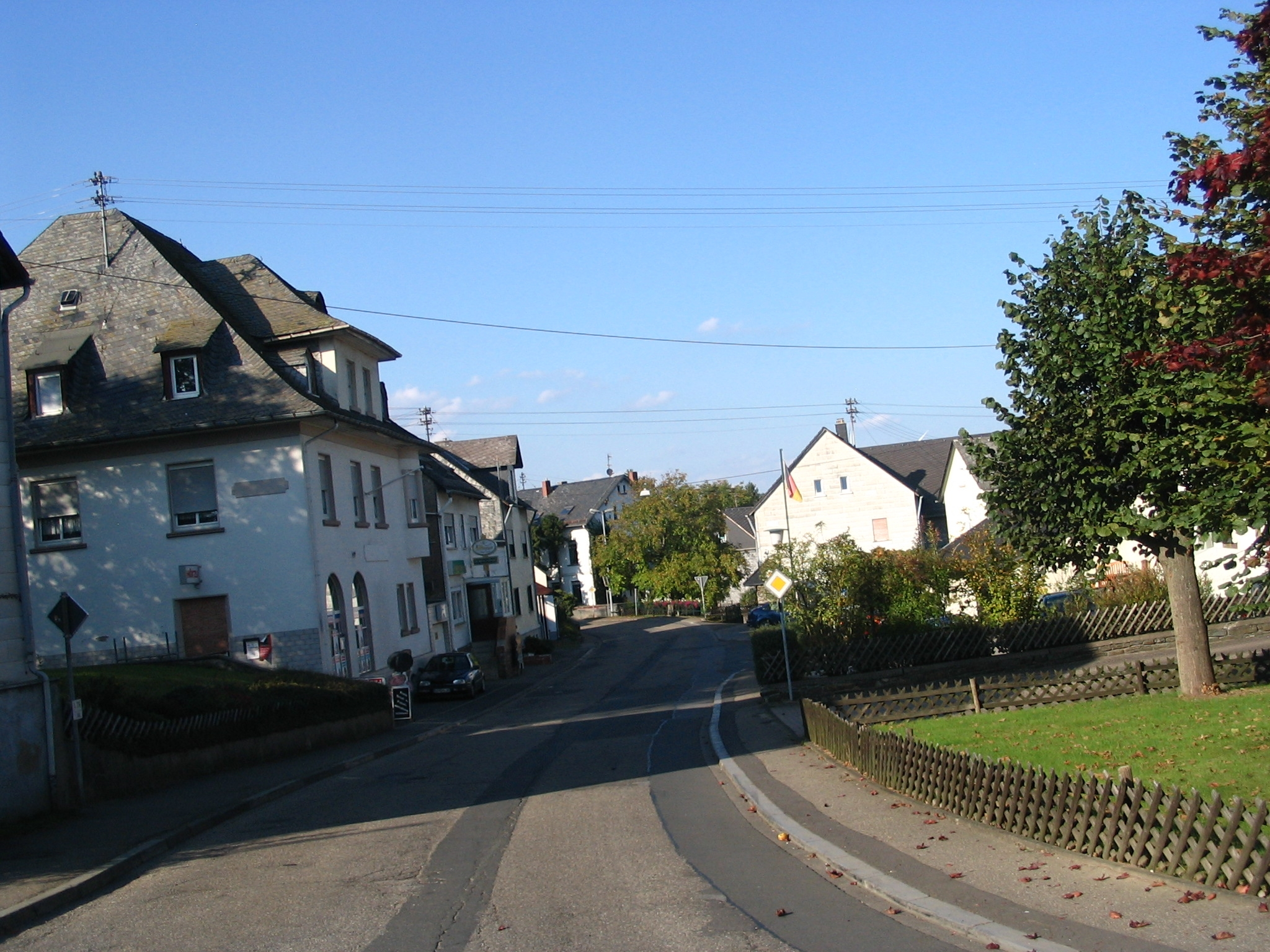
Hauptstraße in the village centre

Pfalzfeld is an Ortsgemeinde – a municipality belonging to a Verbandsgemeinde, a kind of collective municipality – in the Rhein-Hunsrück-Kreis (district) in Rhineland-Palatinate, Germany. It belongs to the Verbandsgemeinde Hunsrück-Mittelrhein, whose seat is in Emmelshausen.

== Geography ==
=== Location ===
The municipality lies in the central Hunsrück between Emmelshausen and Kastellaun, right on the Schinderhannes-Radweg (cycle path).

=== Constituent communities ===
Pfalzfeld has one outlying Ortsteil named Nenzhäuserhof (520 m above sea level).

== History ==
Map of Pfalzfeld (1792)

In 893, Pfalzfeld had its first documentary mention. Listed in a directory of the Sankt Goar Monastery's revenue compiled by Benedictine monks is a service rendered by the settlement of Pfalzfeld. The mention is really only incidental and tells nothing about when the village might have arisen. Nonetheless, the monks duly recorded that 34 cloths, meant to be made into monks' clothing, had been delivered to the monastery, of which 18 came from Sankt Goar itself, 2 from Biebernheim, 1 from Diebach, 12 from Beltheim and 1 from Pfalzfeld. Since Pfalzfeld only managed one cloth, it can be gathered that the village had not reached any great size, nor any great economic importance, and that it was still in its early days. However, it at least seems to have been a cohesive enough community for the village dwellers to come together in the winter months to weave cloth. It could also be that Pfalzfeld (and indeed the other centres in the directory) furnished other goods and services that are not listed in the directory because they did not go straight to the monastery, but rather to the Sankt Goar cell, and served everyday needs.

Although the first documentary mention in itself does not establish the time of Pfalzfeld's birth, another document does narrow down that time somewhat. An 820 donation document from King Louis the Pious to the Sankt Goar Monastery included a great forested area west of the Rhine stretching to the Baybach. Mentioned in this document is Biebernheim, nowadays an outlying centre of Sankt Goar, but nowhere does it mention Pfalzfeld. By no means did donation documents always mention every small village involved in the transfers of property, but if a little place like Biebernheim was mentioned, then surely Pfalzfeld, too, would have been mentioned, had it then existed. This leads to the conclusion that Pfalzfeld must have been founded sometime between the dates of these two documents, 820 and 893, as a newly cleared patch of the forest.

Whenever it was that Pfalzfeld first came into being, it has been called the oldest municipality in the Verbandsgemeinde of Emmelshausen.

Pfalzfeld belonged to the Lower County of Katzenelnbogen and was the seat of the Vogtei of Pfalzfeld. Until 1367, this Vogtei was held in fief from the Counts of Katzenelnbogen by the Lords of Braunshorn. As well as Pfalzfeld, the centres of Niedert, Mühlpfad, Hausbay (half) and the Nenzhäuserhof also belonged to the Vogtei. Beginning in 1794, Pfalzfeld lay under French rule. In 1814 it was assigned to the Kingdom of Prussia at the Congress of Vienna. Since 1946, it has been part of the then newly founded state of Rhineland-Palatinate. In 1993, within the framework of a great local festival, the village's 1,100th birthday (or at least, anniversary of the first documentary mention) was celebrated.

== Politics ==
=== Municipal council ===
The council is made up of 12 council members, who were elected by majority vote at the municipal election held on 7 June 2009, and the honorary mayor as chairman.

=== Mayor ===
Pfalzfeld's mayor is Rainer Steeg, elected in 2019.

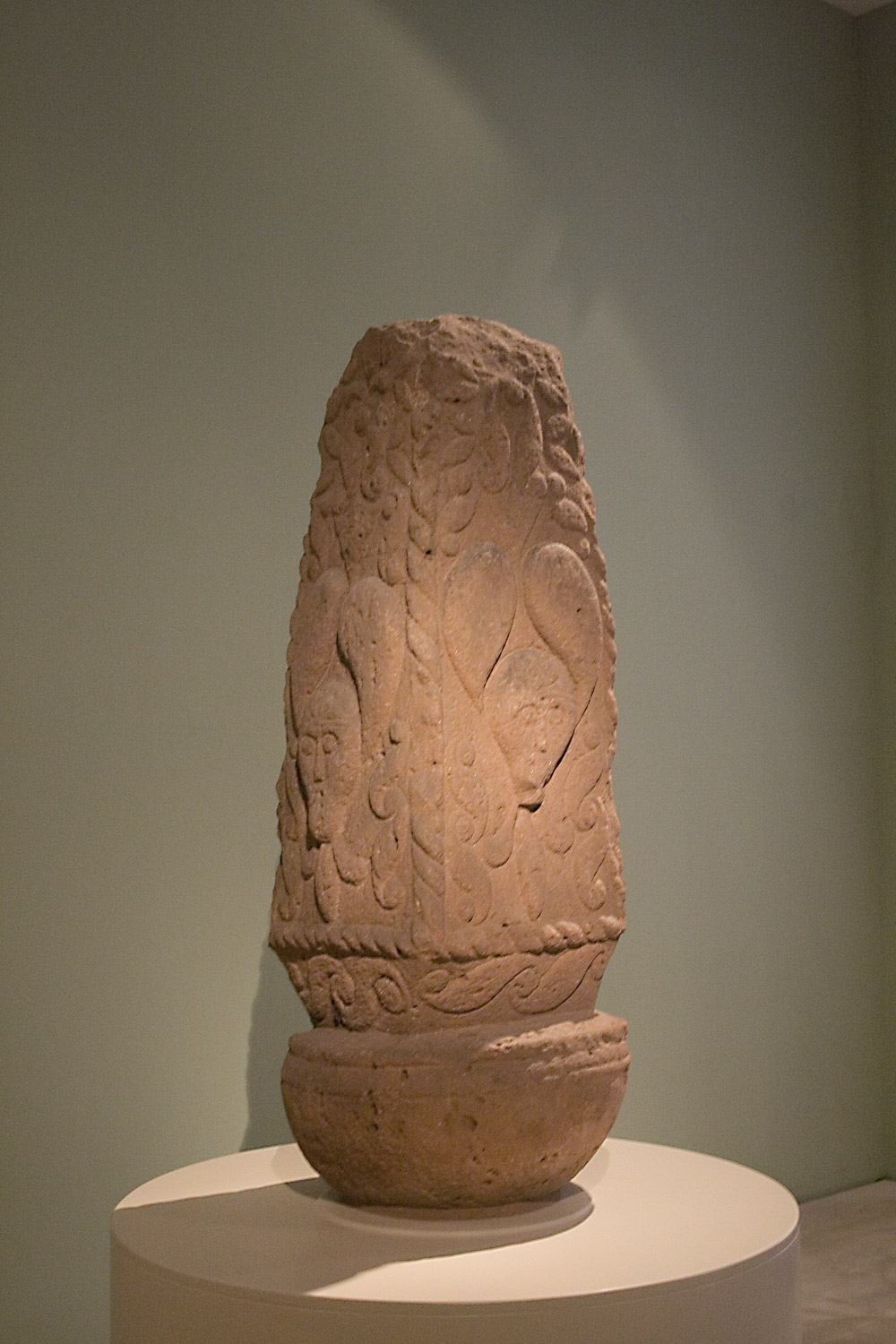
The Pfalzfelder Flammensäule in the Rheinisches Landesmuseum Bonn

=== Coat of arms ===
The German blazon reads: In Gold ein aufgerichteter roter Obelisk, der einen Menschenkopf mit Flügelhaube und umgebendem Rankenwerk zeigt.

The municipality's arms might in English heraldic language be described thus: Or an obelisk showing a human head with a winged bonnet beset with scroll ornaments gules.

The single charge in these arms is a stylized representation of the Pfalzfeld obelisk, probably removed from an Iron age burial ground to the churchyard in Pfalzfeld, it is first recorded there in 1608. It is said to be one of the most important works from the La Tène culture; it is reckoned to date from the 4th century BC. The tinctures refer to the Lower County of Katzenelnbogen, to which Pfalzfeld belonged until a definitive end was put to the Holy Roman Empire.

The obelisk can today be found in the Rheinisches Landesmuseum Bonn.

== Culture and sightseeing ==
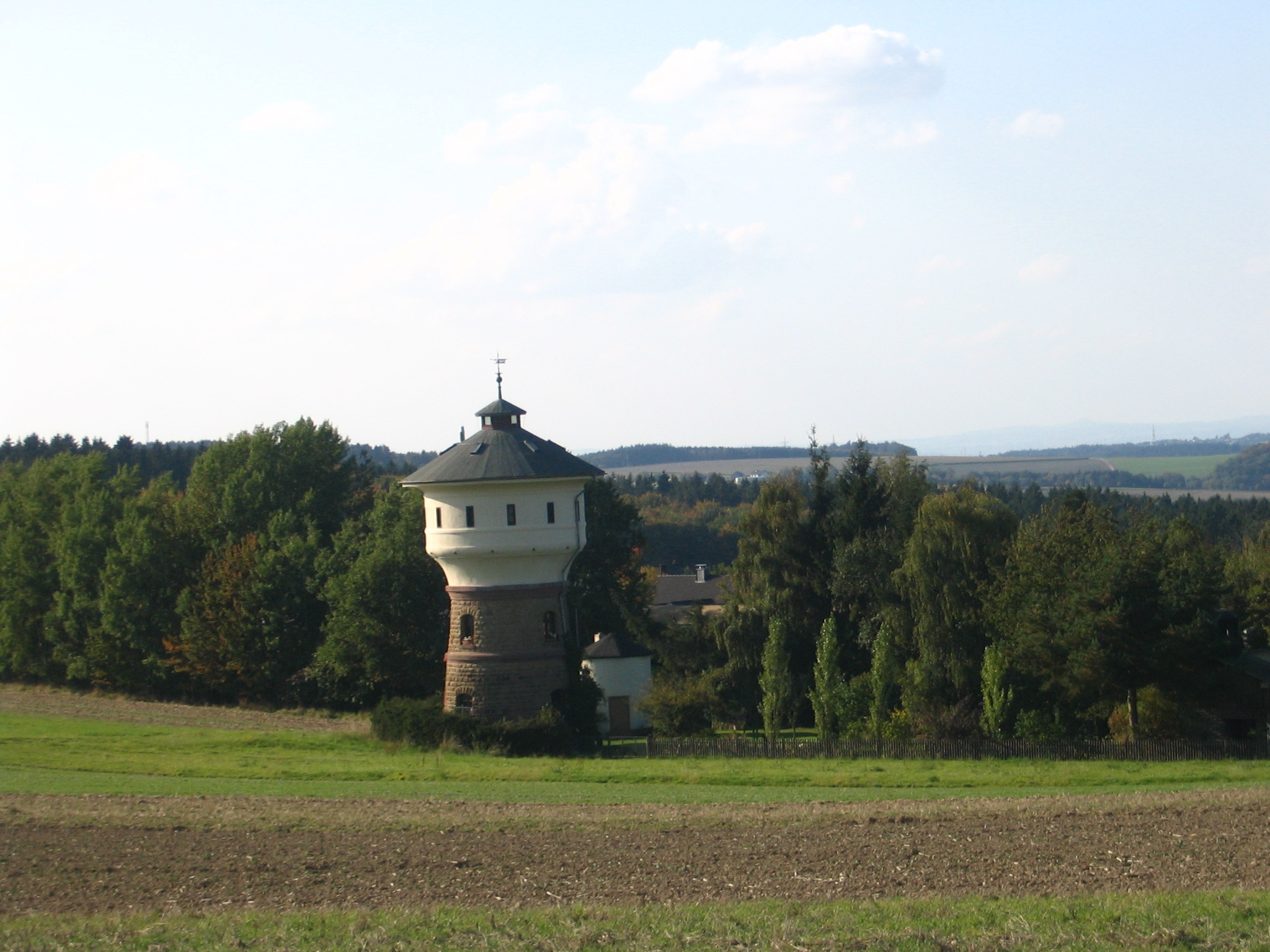
Hauptstraße 40: watertower

=== Buildings ===
The following are listed buildings or sites in Rhineland-Palatinate's Directory of Cultural Monuments:

- Evangelical parish church, Hauptstraße – Baroque quarrystone aisleless church, marked 1747, tower marked 1582; whole complex of buildings with graveyard
- Hauptstraße 28 – estate complex along the street; slated timber-frame house, 19th century
- Hauptstraße 40 – former Hunsrückbahn railway station; reception building, plaster and stone-block building, about 1908; one-and-one-half-floor storage and loading building, building with half-hipped roof; watertower, marked 1907; whole complex of buildings with track facilities
- Hausbayer Straße 3 – timber-frame Quereinhaus (a combination residential and commercial house divided for these two purposes down the middle, perpendicularly to the street), partly solid and slated, 19th century
- Ringstraße 2 – L-shaped estate; timber-frame house, partly slated, 19th century
- St. Goarer Straße 17 – timber-frame Quereinhaus, late 19th century
- St. Goarer Straße 26 – timber-frame Quereinhaus, slated, mid 19th century
