= Glauberg =

Celtic oppidum in Hesse, Germany

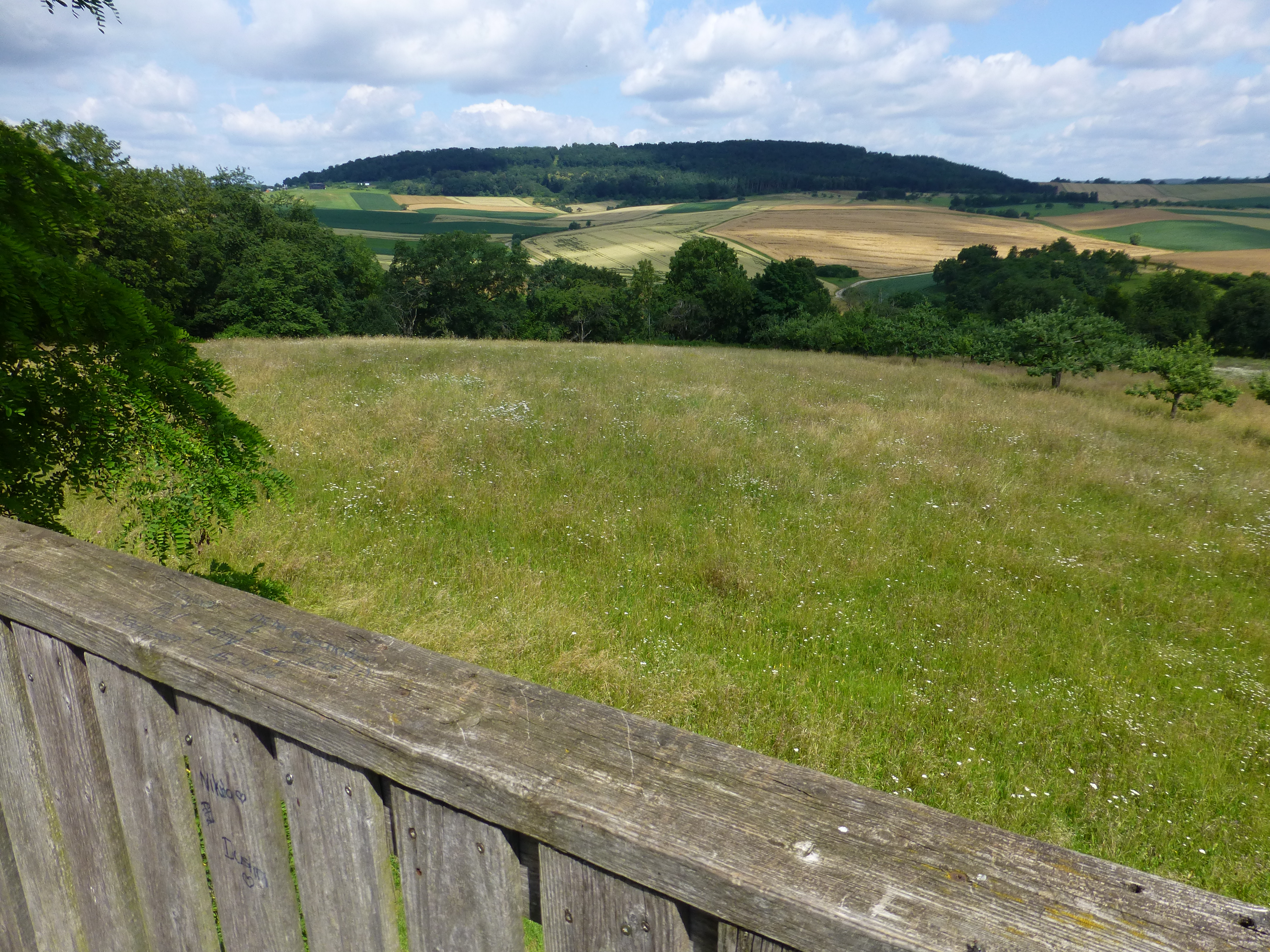
- The Glauberg seen from the southeast

- Location within Hesse Location within Germany
- 50°18′19″N 9°00′31″E
- Type: Burial mounds, Circular rampart or Oppidum
- Periods: Iron Age
- Cultures: Celts, Urnfield culture, Hallstatt culture, La Tène
- Location: Glauburg, Hesse
- Region: Germany

Site notes
- Public access: Yes

The Glauberg is a Celtic hillfort or oppidum in Hesse, Germany consisting of a fortified settlement and several burial mounds, "a princely seat of the late Hallstatt and early La Tène periods."

Archaeological discoveries in the 1990s place the site among the most important early Celtic centres in Europe. It provides unprecedented evidence on Celtic burial, sculpture and monumental architecture.

== Location and topography ==
Geologically, the Glauberg, a ridge (271 m asl) on the east edge of the Wetterau plain, is a basalt spur of the Vogelsberg range. Rising about 150 m above the surrounding areas, it is located between the rivers Nidder and Seeme and belongs to the community of Glauburg. The hilltop forms a nearly horizontal plateau of 800 by 80–200m. Its southwest promontory is known as Enzheimer Köpfchen. To the northwest, the Glauberg slopes steeply down towards the Nidder valley and, in the south, it is connected with undulating uplands. The plateau contained a small perennial pond, which was not fed by springs but simply by surface runoff. The hill is surrounded by springs and fertile land.

== History of archaeological research ==
The presence of ancient ruins on the Glauberg plateau has long been known, though they were credited to the Romans. The discovery of a fragment of an early La Tène torc in 1906 confirmed the prehistoric nature of the site. Systematic archaeological research began in 1933–1934 with an excavation led by Heinrich Richter (1895–1970) which focused on the fortification. Further studies directed by F.-R. Hermann began in 1985 and continued until 1998. It was during this phase that the important burial mound was examined. The settlement history of the Glauberg and its area in Celtic times (Hallstatt and early La Tène periods) was the focus of a research project (2004–2006) by the 'Deutsche Forschungsgemeinschaft'.

Excavations continue into the present day with a multinational team excavating what is believed to be a former massive rampart at the hillfort that is currently only visible through lidar.

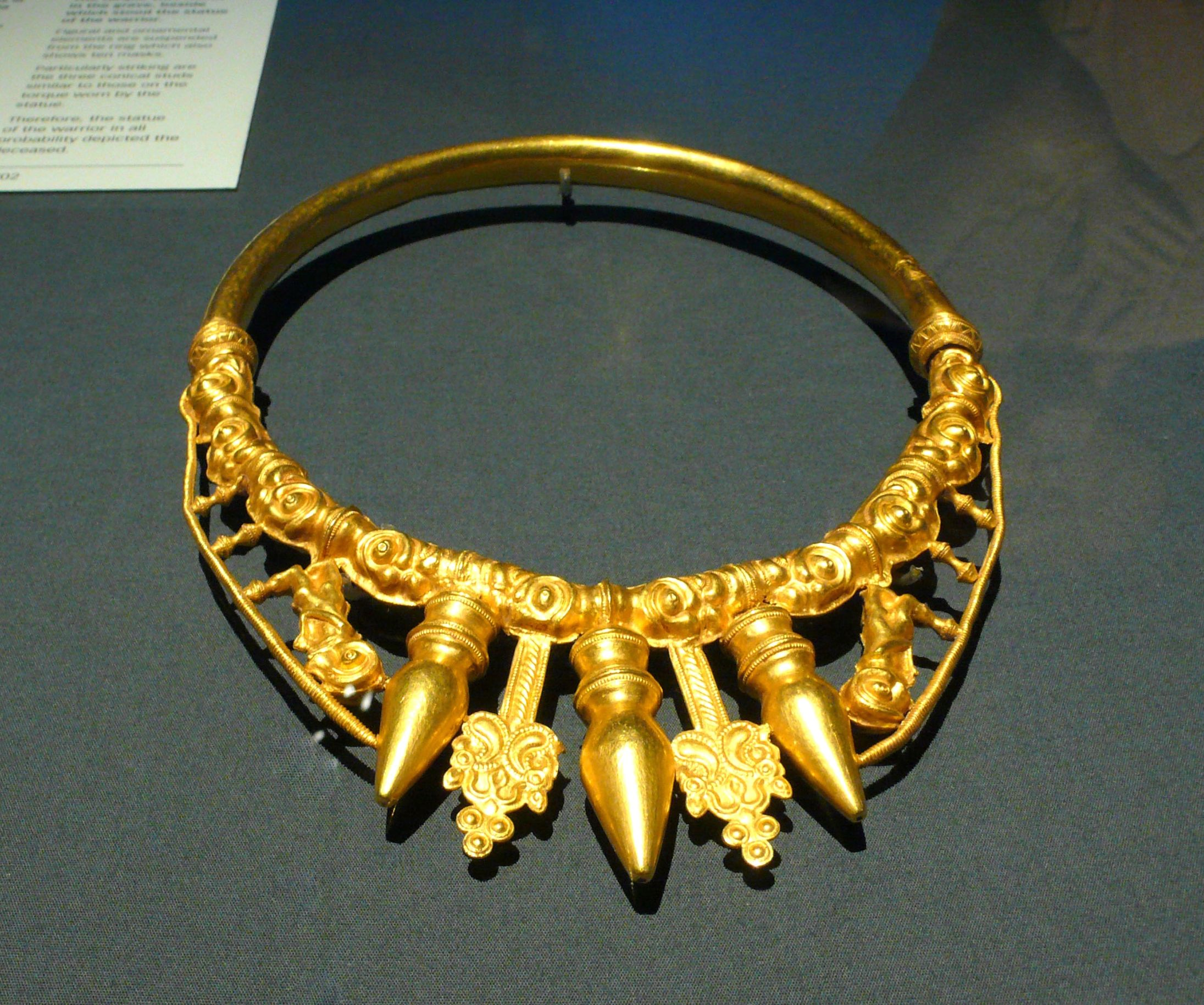
Gold Celtic torc found in the larger tumulus at Glauberg, 400 BC

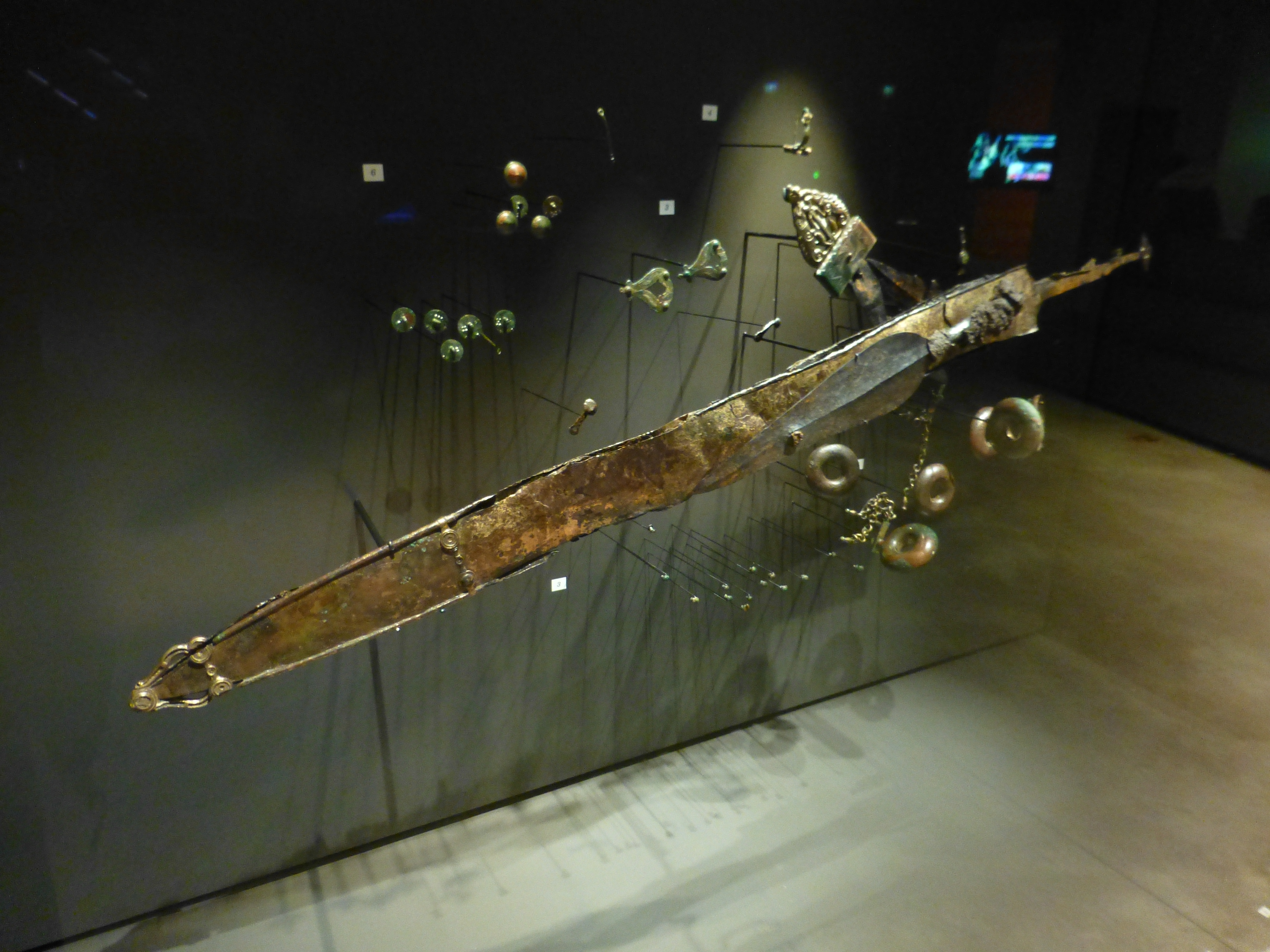
La Tène period sword and ornaments, Glauberg museum

== Summary of settlement history ==
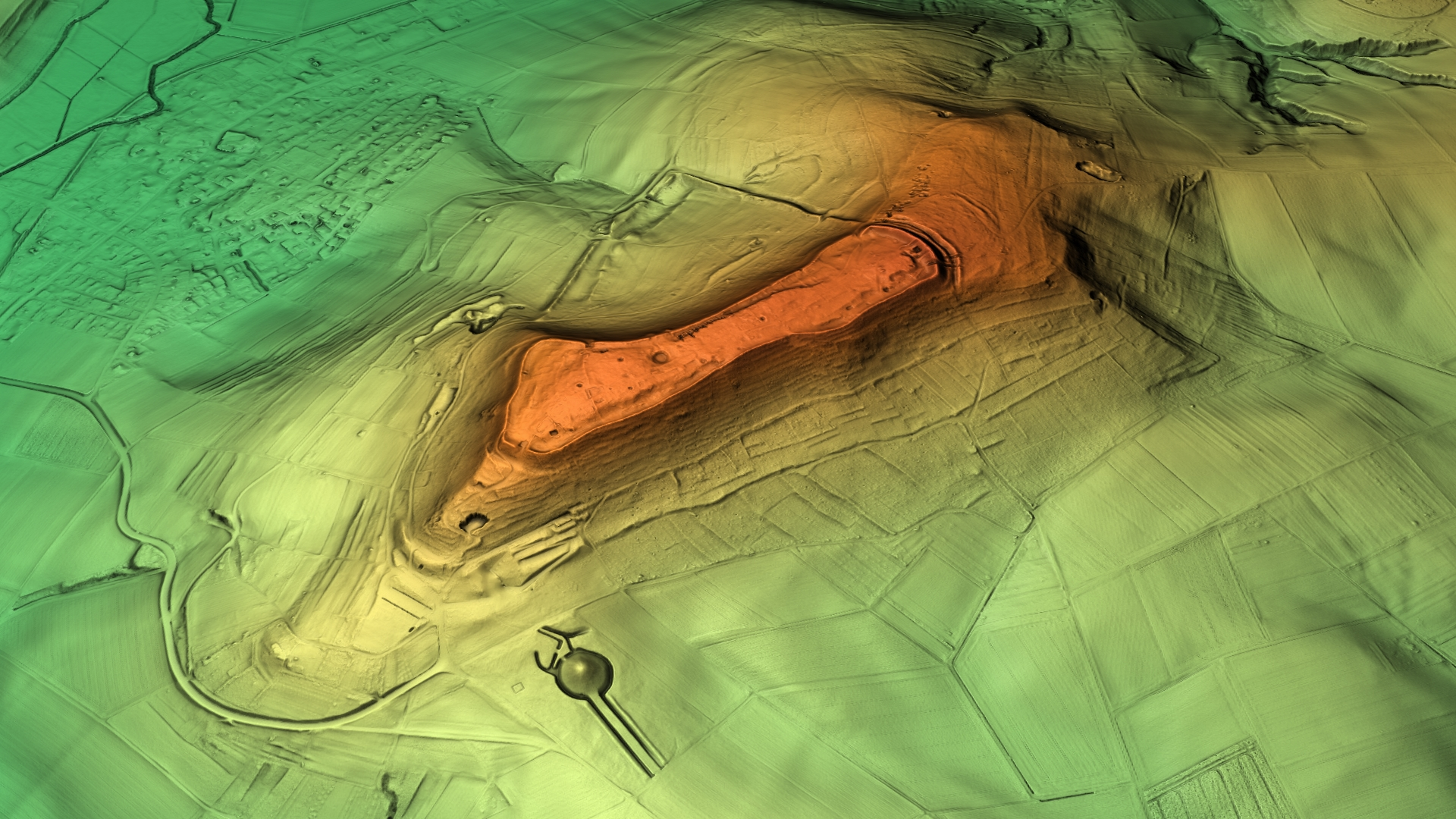
Digital imaging of the Glauberg topography.

The topographic location marks the Glauberg as a long-term focus of human activity. It combines access to fertile arable land and water with an easily defensible site and a strategic location along several natural traffic routes. Thus, it is not surprising that the hill was the site of human occupation long before and long after its Celtic phase, well into the medieval period.

The Glauberg plateau was first settled in the Neolithic era (c. 4500 BC) by people of the Rössen culture. This was followed by a large settlement of the Michelsberg phase (4000 BC). Michelsberg hilltop fortifications are known elsewhere, so it is possible that the hill was fortified for the first time at that stage. The hill was also settled by the late Bronze Age Urnfield culture (1,000–800 BC). During the Celtic late Hallstatt/early La Tène period, the Glauberg became a centre of supra-regional importance. At this time, it was the seat of an early Celtic prince. Extensive fortifications were erected.

During the Roman occupation of Germany, the Glauberg remained unoccupied, probably due to its proximity (5 km) to the fortified Limes Germanicus border. In the 4th and 5th centuries AD, it was reoccupied and became a regional centre once again, as the seat of a local king of the Alamanni. From the 7th to the 9th century, it was the site of a large Frankish fortification. Its importance grew throughout this time, and the fortifications were renewed and extended considerably.

In the 12th and 13th centuries, the Glauberg was incorporated into the Staufer system of castles, perhaps in an attempt to foster the growth of an urban centre. The fortifications were renovated again, and a tower-like castle was erected on the edge of the plateau; its arched romanesque doorway survives. The whole plateau was settled at this time, medieval foundations of walls, wells and basements survive especially at its north edge. The destruction of that castle, and with it the end of human occupation on the hill, probably occurred in 1256.

== Celtic oppidum ==
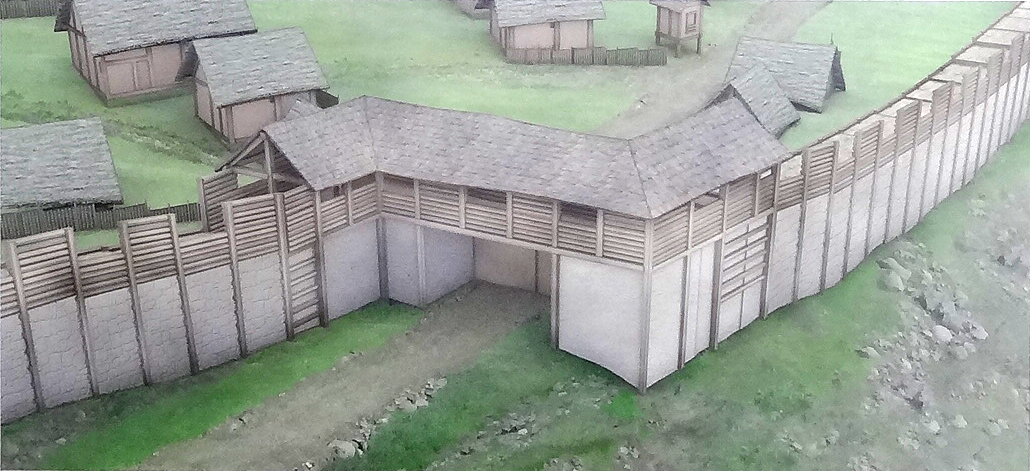
Glauberg oppidum, main entrance gate (reconstruction), c. 500 BC.

The earliest known fortifications might be pre-Celtic, but they reached a high point in terms of size and elaboration around the 6th or 5th century BC. They remained in use until the 2nd or 1st century BC. Their extent and dimensions mark the Glauberg as one of a network of fortified sites (or oppida) that covered most of south and west central Germany.

The northeast edge of the hill, where the slope is least severe, was disconnected from the adjacent ground by the erection of a massive ditch and bank, perhaps originally forming a promontory fort. The southern and northern edges were also fortified with walls. The walling techniques included drystone walling, the murus gallicus (a typical Celtic technique of wood and stone) and perhaps also mudbrick.

Glauberg oppidum, reconstruction

The small hilltop pond would not have sufficed to ensure water supply for the population of so large a settlement. For this reason, an annex was added to the north, with two walls running downslope, enclosing an additional triangular area of 300 x 300 m, including a spring. The point of that annex contained a huge water reservoir, measuring 150 by 60 m. At this time, the fortification was 650 m long, nearly 500 m wide, and enclosed an area of 8.5 ha.

At least two gates, a main one to the northeast and a smaller one to the south, gave access to the interior. They are fairly complex in shape, designed to make access for a possible attacker more difficult. An outer fortification was placed beyond the northeast edge of the oppidum. Walls or banks to the south probably played no defensive role.

Such settlements probably housed populations numbering in the thousands. For this reason, combined with their centralising economic role, Celtic oppida are sometime described as proto-urban. Nonetheless, little is known about settlement and other activity on the interior of the site. Evidence from the sites at Manching or Heidetrank suggests that there was probably a village or town-like settlement with houses, workshops and storage areas.

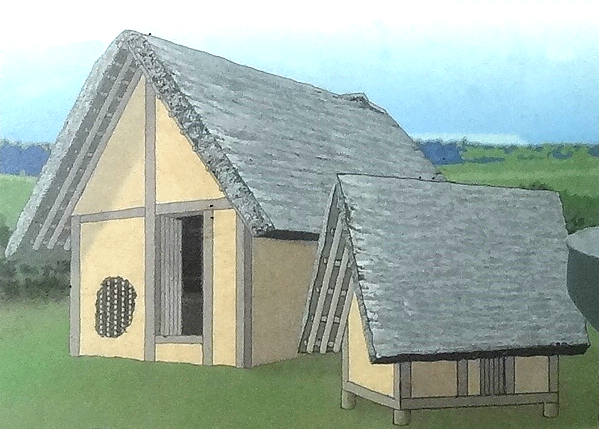
Celtic house (left) and granary (right), Glauberg oppidum

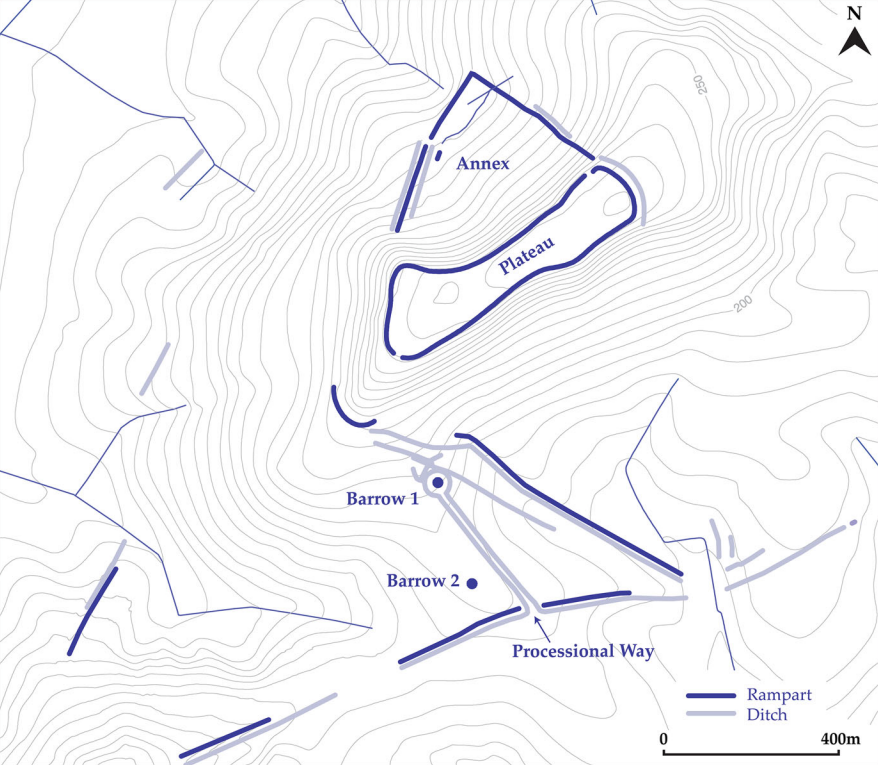
Plan of the Glauberg oppidum, burial mounds (barrows), ramparts and ditch systems

== Sites associated with the oppidum ==
Like other such sites, the Glauberg oppidum is connected with several other contemporary sites/complexes in its immediate vicinity:

=== "Princely" burial mounds ===
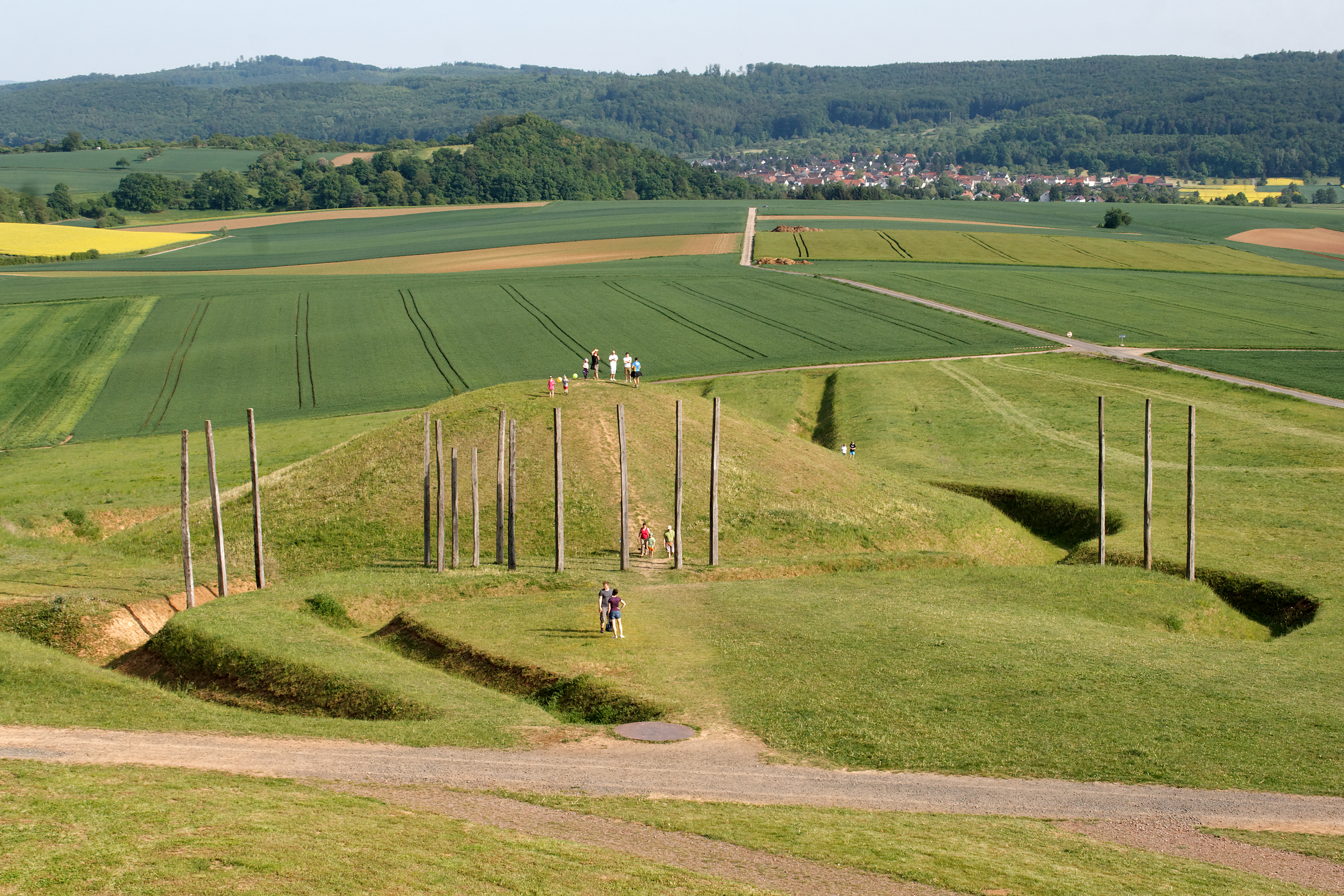
The reconstructed Mound 1

During an exploratory overflight in 1988, local amateur historians recognised the traces of a large tumulus in a field 300 m south of the oppidum. Between 1994 and 1997, the State Archaeological Service of Hesse excavated it. The mound (mound 1) originally had a diameter of nearly 50 m and a height of 6 m. It was surrounded by a circular ditch 10 m wide. At the time, it must have been an extremely visually striking monument. The tumulus contained three features. An empty pit was placed at the centre, perhaps to mislead potential looters. To the northwest, a wooden chamber of 2 x 1 m contained an inhumation, and to the southeast, a cremation burial had been placed in some kind of wooden container. Cremations are more commonly associated with the Halstatt phase, inhumation with the La Tène one.

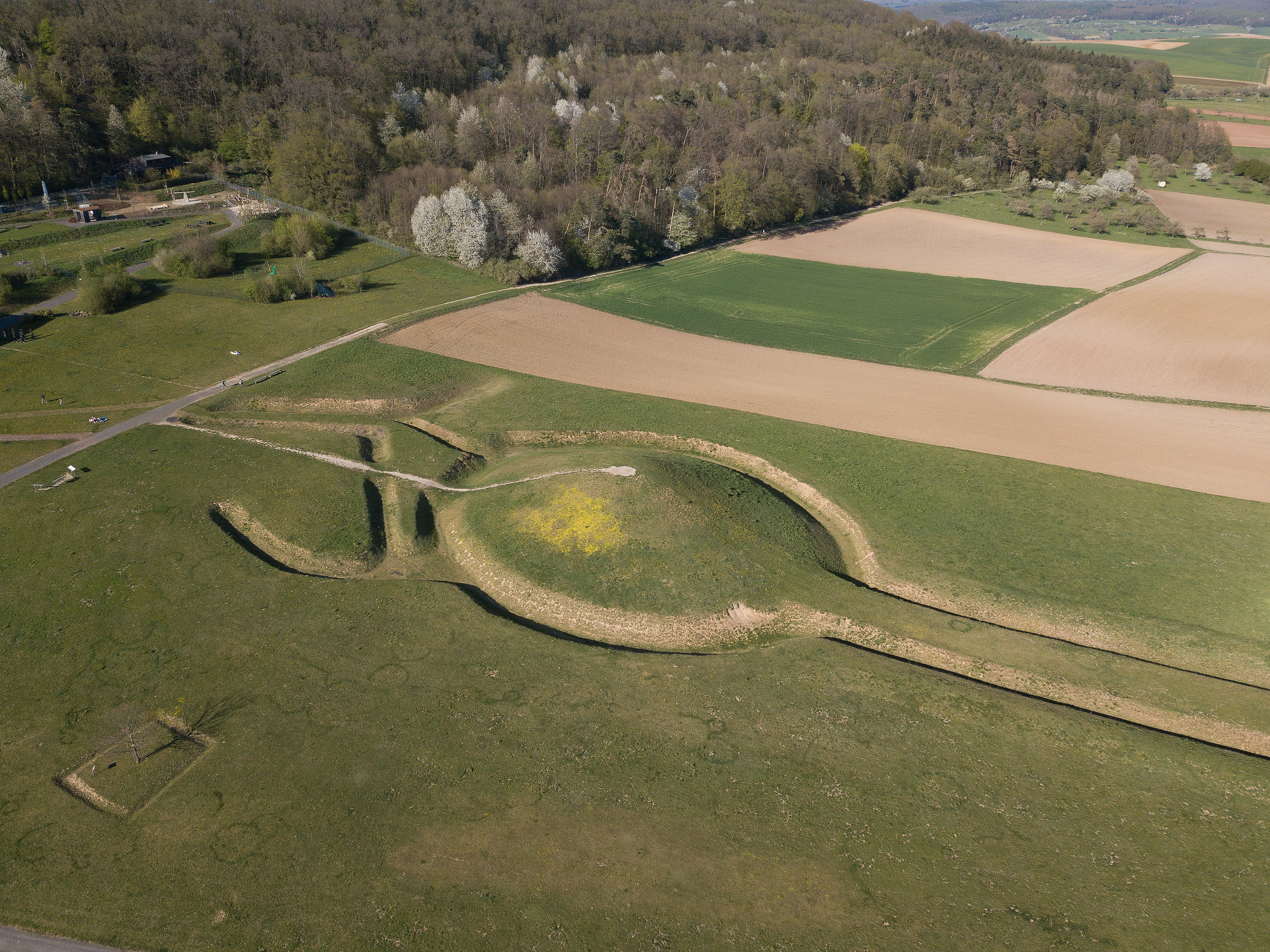
Burial mound, earthworks and processional road (right)

The occupants of both graves were warriors, as indicated by their accompanying material: swords and weaponry. The chamber with the inhumation was extremely well preserved and had never been looted. For this reason, it was decided to remove the whole chamber en bloque and excavate it more slowly and carefully in the State Service laboratory at Wiesbaden. The finds from the main burial chamber, each carefully wrapped in cloth, include a fine gold torc and a bronze tubular jug that had contained mead.

A second tumulus (mound 2), 250 m to the south, was discovered later by geophysical survey. Erosion and ploughing had made it totally invisible. About half the size of mound 1, it also contained a warrior, accompanied by weapons, a decorated fibula and belt, and a gold ring.

The high quality of the tomb furnishings as well as other features associated with them indicate that the graves, and their occupants, were of extremely high status. They are therefore classed as "princely" burials, on a par with other well-known finds, including those at Vix (Burgundy, France), and Hochdorf (Baden-Württemberg, Germany).

=== Earthworks and processional road ===
A number of earth features (banks and ditches) are located south of the oppidum, some closely associated with mound 1. They appear to play no defensive role. A small square ditch west of the mound is associated with several other features and a number of large postholes, perhaps suggesting a shrine or temple. Most strikingly, a processional way 350 m long, 10 m wide and flanked by deep ditches approached the tumulus from the southeast, far beyond the settlement perimeter. This was associated with further banks and ditches extending over an area of nearly 2 by 2 km. They also contained at least two burials, as well as the statue described below.

==== Possible calendar function ====
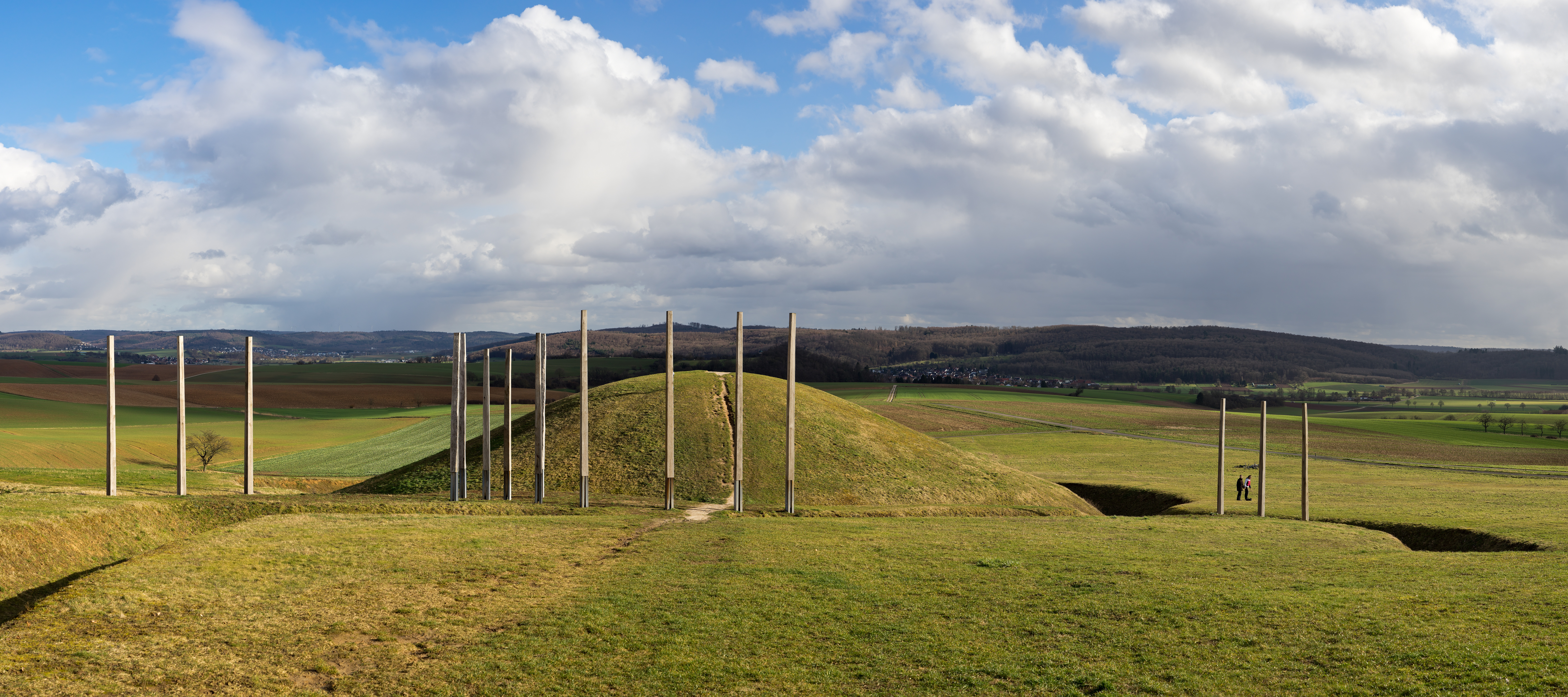
Burial mound and reconstructed posts

The lack of a defensive function and the focus on the burial mounds have led to the suggestion that the enclosure and road system had a ritual or sacred significance.

Posluschny (2007, 2019) found that the processional road is aligned to the point of the major lunar standstill at moonrise, which occurs once every 18.6 years. The astronomical knowledge required to create such an alignment would have required long-term observation of the skies, possibly over several generations. Posluschny suggests that a precursor to the processional road may date back to the Late Bronze Age.

Further analyses have indicated that other ditches and 16 large postholes associated with the burial mound could have been used to observe different astronomical phenomena, such as the solstices, with the whole ensemble functioning as a calendar. A calendar function has also been proposed for the earlier Magdalenenberg burial mound.

=== The Keltenfürst (Celtic prince) of Glauberg ===
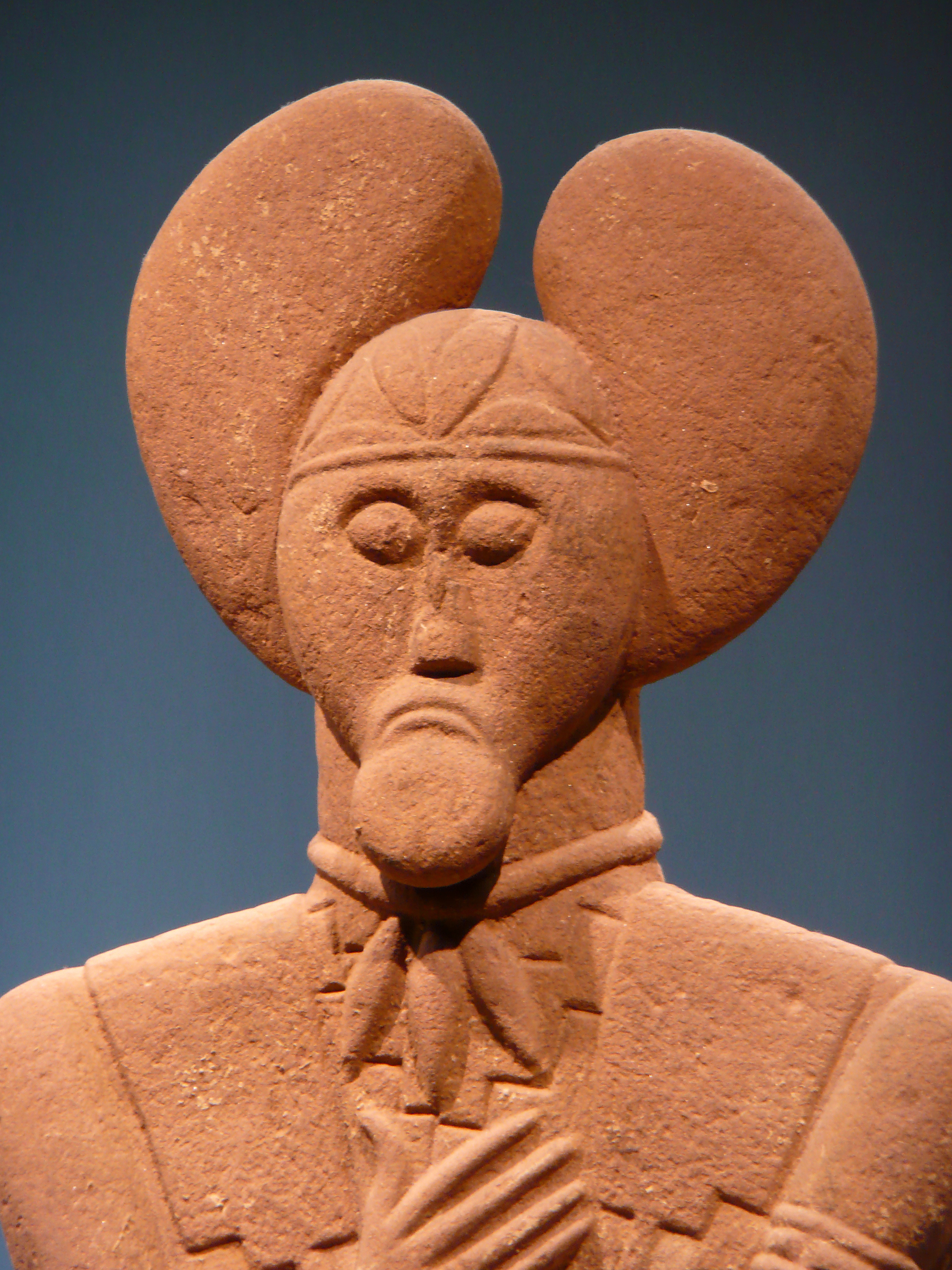
The Prince of Glauberg, with mistletoe crown

Much international attention was attracted by the 1996 discovery of an extremely rare find, a life-sized sandstone statue or stele, dating from the 5th century BC, which was found just outside the larger tumulus. The stele, fully preserved except for its feet, depicts an armed male warrior. It measures 186 cm in height and weighs 230 kg. It is made from a type of sandstone available within a few kilometres of Glauberg. Much detail is clearly visible: his trousers, composite armour tunic, wooden shield and a short sword in a scabbard with an anthropomorphic hilt (of La Tène style), hanging from his right side.

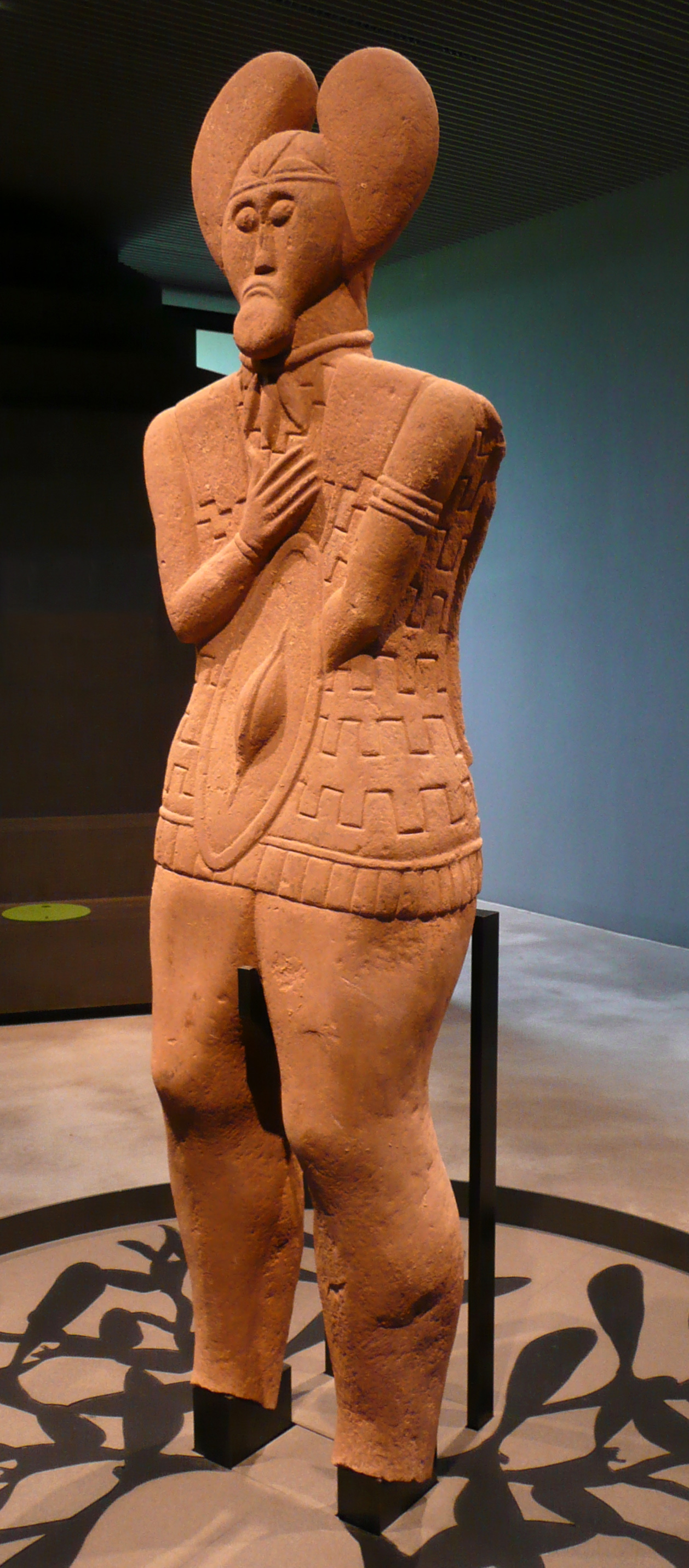
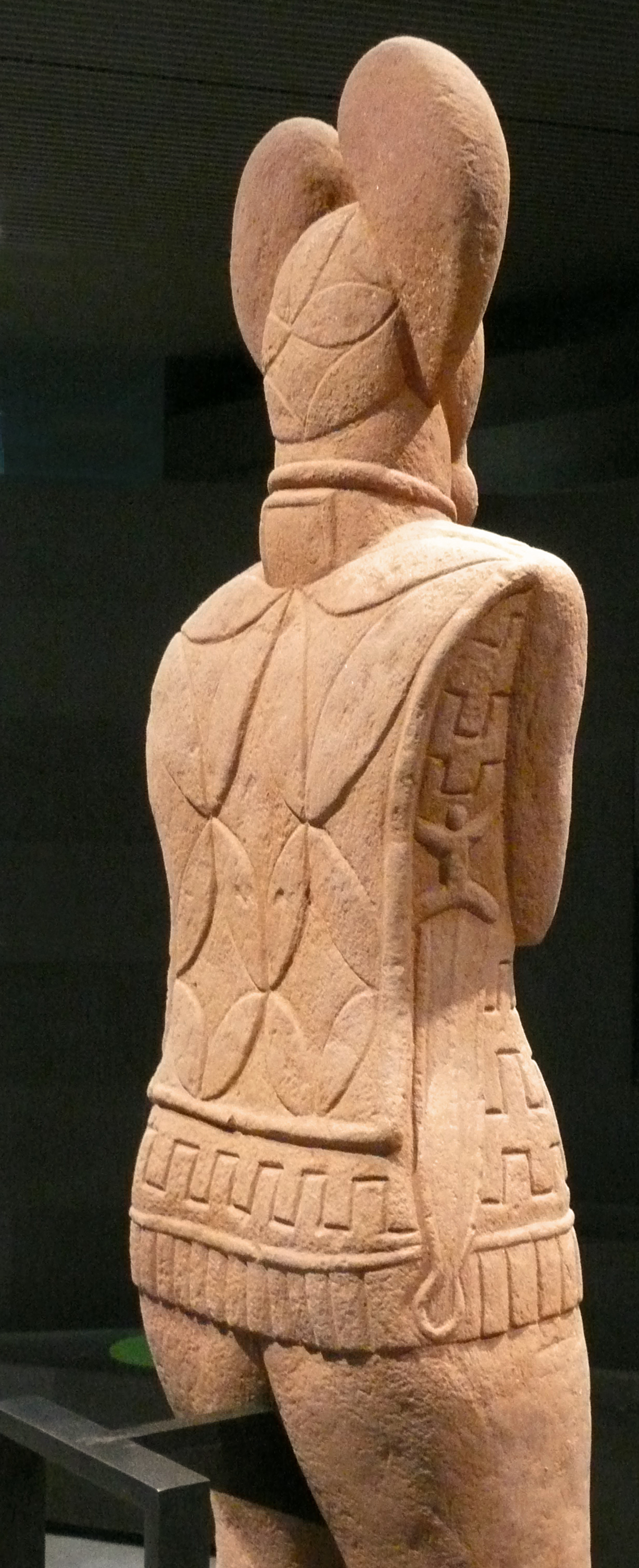
Left: The Celtic Prince of Glauberg (5th century BC). Right: Reverse side, with short sword in scabbard.

The figure has a moustache and wears a torc with three pendants, remarkably similar to the one from the chamber in mound 1, with several rings on both arms and one on the right hand. On his head, he wears a "leaf crown", or hood-like headdress crowned by two protrusions, resembling the shape of mistletoe leaves. Such headdresses are also known from a handful of contemporary sculptures, and coins. As mistletoe is believed to have held a magical or religious significance to the Celts, it could indicate that the individual depicted also played the role of a priest or druid. Short swords similar to that depicted on the statue have been found across central and western Europe, with lunar symbols on their blades that are thought to represent different stages of the lunar cycle or lunar eclipses. These swords have been associated with a priestly class, or druids, who possessed a knowledge of astronomy. Similarities between these symbols and the later Coligny calendar have also been suggested.

The remains of a similar mistletoe-shaped 'leaf crown' have been found at Fiskerton in England dating from c. 450 BC, at the site of a wooden causeway used to make ritual depositions into the Witham river. Dating of the causeway timbers has shown that they were felled at intervals corresponding to lunar eclipses, indicating that the builders had a knowledge of lunar eclipse cycles. A short sword with an anthropomorphic hilt and a lunar symbol on its blade was also found nearby. Similar evidence from other sites in the British Isles and Central Europe suggests that this knowledge may have been relatively widespread from the Late Bronze Age through to the Late Iron Age.

Fragments of three similar statues have been discovered in the Glauberg area. It is suggested that all four statues once stood in the rectangular enclosure, and may have been associated with an ancestor cult.

Parallels to the Glauberg warrior statue exist in the form of stelae from other La Tène sites, such as the Holzgerlingen figure (Württemberg State Museum in Stuttgart), a pillar-stele from Pfalzfeld (de), today in the Rheinisches Landesmuseum Bonn, the Warrior of Hirschlanden and others.

== Southern Hesse - a Celtic landscape ==
The Glauberg is not isolated within its time and area, although it is the most northeasterly site of its type known at present. But several other important Celtic population centres or oppida are known from the Rhein-Main Region and Central Hesse. Two important fortifications, those at Dünsberg near Giessen and Heidetränk Oppidum (one of the largest urban settlements in Celtic Europe) near Altkönig in the Taunus mountains are visible from Glauberg. Nearby is also the Celtic salt industry at Bad Nauheim.

== Significance ==
The discoveries at Glauberg have added several new perspectives to the understanding of early Celtic Europe. They have somewhat expanded the known extent of early La Tène civilization, they have thrown much light on the early development of Celtic art, and most importantly of sculpture. The warrior figure and other material support suggestions of links and contact with the civilisations of the Mediterranean at this early point. The ritual complex surrounding the tomb has added a whole new monument type to European prehistory.

Sites like Glauberg, sometimes referred to as Fürstensitze (Princely seats), indicate a parallel development of social hierarchies developing across late Hallstatt Europe. Elite sites, characterised by massive fortifications, the presence of imported materials and of elaborate burials developed along the important trade routes across the continent. Glauberg must now be considered a proto-urban centre of power, trade and cult, of similar importance to such sites as Bibracte, or Manching, but especially of other "princely" fortified settlements, such as Heuneburg, Hohenasperg and Mont Lassois.

== Archaeological park and museum ==
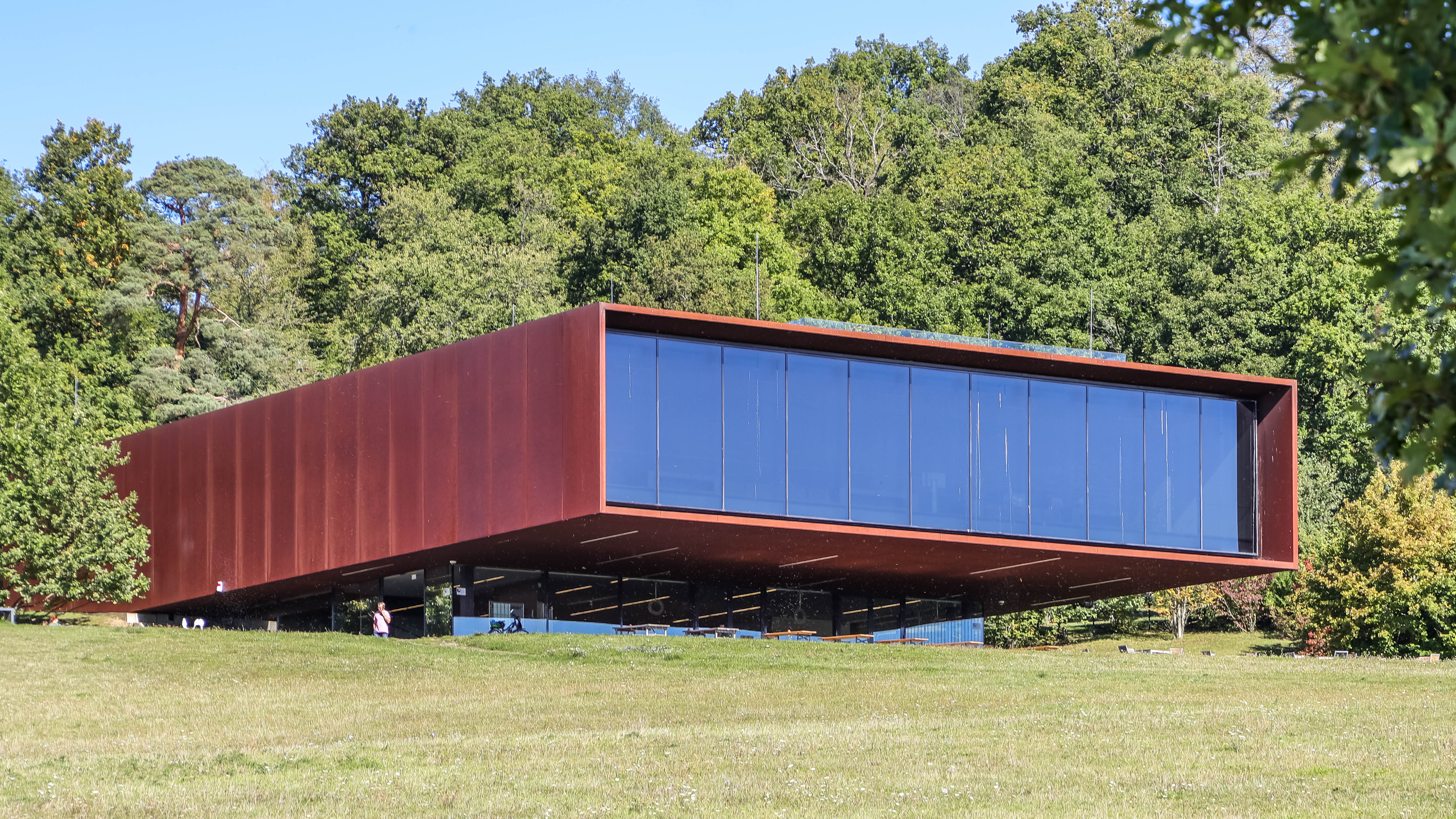
Keltenwelt museum at Glauberg

An archaeological park has been built, with the aim of making the site and its context accessible and comprehensible to visitors and providing a space for exhibiting the finds locally. Previously, some of the finds, including the statue, were on display in the Hessian State Museum at Darmstadt.

Construction for the museum started in 2007, with completion originally projected for 2009. It opened on 5 May 2011.

By November 2015, the museum had counted around 300,000 visitors and estimated the total number of people who had come to see the Keltenwelt (i.e. including those who just explored the 30 ha open air archaeological park) at around 500,000.

== See also ==
- Celtic Hero from Bohemia
- Warrior of Hirschlanden
- Hochdorf Chieftain's Grave
- Heuneburg
- Keltenmuseum, Hallein
- Oppidum of Bibracte
- Oppidum of Manching
- Vix and Mont Lassois

== Bibliography ==
- H. Baitinger, Der frühkeltische Fürstensitz auf dem Glauberg — Stand der Erforschung, DFG online publication 2006. Pdf
- H. Baitinger/F.-R. Herrmann, Statues of Early Celtic princes from Glauburg-Glauberg, Wetterau district, Hesse (D). In: B. Fagan (ed.), Archaeology now: great discoveries of our time (forthcoming).
- H. Baitinger/F.-R. Herrmann, Der Glauberg am Ostrand der Wetterau. Arch. Denkmäler Hessen 51 (3. ed. Wiesbaden 2007).
- F.-M. Bosinski/F.-R. Herrmann, Zu den frühkeltischen Statuen vom Glauberg. Ber. Komm. Arch. Landesforsch. Hessen 5, 1998/99 (2000) p. 41—48.
- O.-H. Frey/F.-R. Herrmann, Ein frühkeltischer Fürstengrabhügel am Glauberg im Wetteraukreis, Hessen. Bericht über die Forschungen 1994—1996. Germania 75, 1997, 459—550; also published separately (Wiesbaden 1998).
- F.-R. Herrmann, Der Glauberg am Ostrand der Wetterau. Arch. Denkmäler Hessen 51 (Wiesbaden 1985; 2nd ed. Wiesbaden 2000).
- F.-R. Herrmann, Keltisches Heiligtum am Glauberg in Hessen. Ein Neufund frühkeltischer Großplastik. Antike Welt 29, 1998, p. 345—348.
- F.-R. Herrmann, Der Glauberg: Fürstensitz, Fürstengräber und Heiligtum. In: H. Baitinger/B. Pinsker (Red.), Das Rätsel der Kelten vom Glauberg (Exhibition Cat. Frankfurt a. Main 2002) 90—107.
- F.-R. Herrmann, Glauberg — Olympia des Nordens oder unvollendete Stadtgründung? In: J. Biel/D. Krausse (Hrsg.), Frühkeltische Fürstensitze. Älteste Städte und Herrschaftszentren nördlich der Alpen? Internat. Workshop Eberdingen-Hochdorf 12./13. September 2003. Arch. Inf. Baden-Württemberg 51. Schr. Keltenmus. Hochdorf/Enz 6 (Esslingen 2005) p. 18—27.
- F.-R. Herrmann, Fürstengrabhügel 2 am Glauberg. Denkmalpfl. u. Kulturgesch. H. 3, 2006, p. 27 f.
- F.-R. Herrmann/O.-H. Frey, Die Keltenfürsten vom Glauberg. Ein frühkeltischer Fürstengrabhügel bei Glauburg-Glauberg, Wetteraukreis. Arch. Denkmäler Hessen 128/129 (Wiesbaden 1996) p. 8 ff.
- F.-R. Herrmann in: F.-R. Hermann/A. Jockenhövel (Hrsg.), Die Vorgeschichte Hessens (Stuttgart 1990) p. 385 ff.
- H. Richter, Der Glauberg (Bericht über die Ausgrabungen 1933—1934). Volk u. Scholle 12, 1934, p. 289—316.
