= Holzgerlingen figure =

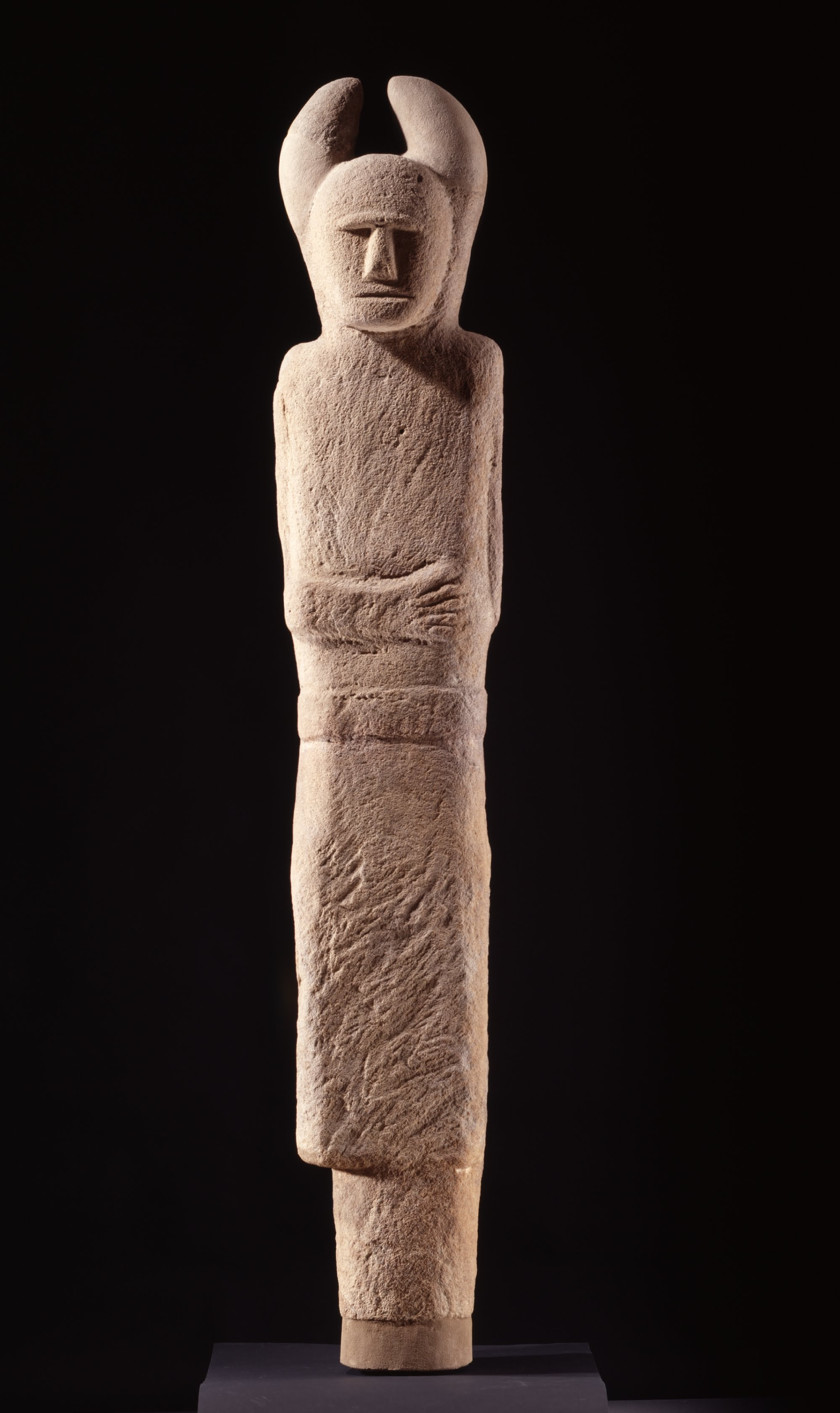
The Holzgerlingen figure.

The Holzgerlingen figure is a two-faced anthropomorphic statue of the early to middle La Tène culture. The statue depicts a human figure from the belt up, each side carved with a mirror image of the other, wearing a horn-like headdress which is probably an example of the Celtic leaf-crown motif.

The statue is thought to be a Celtic cult object, perhaps representing a god, though it is less often identified as a funerary monument. Over 2 metres tall, the Holzgerlingen figure is the largest known Iron Age statue. It is in the collection of the Landesmuseum Württemberg, Baden-Württemberg, Germany.

== Discovery ==
The circumstances under which the Holzgerlingen figure was found are very uncertain. The stone was apparently excavated from a spot near the municipality of Holzgerlingen, but the exact site of its discovery is not now known. It was found either in 1838 or 1848. It is now in the collection of the Landesmuseum Württemberg.

== Description ==
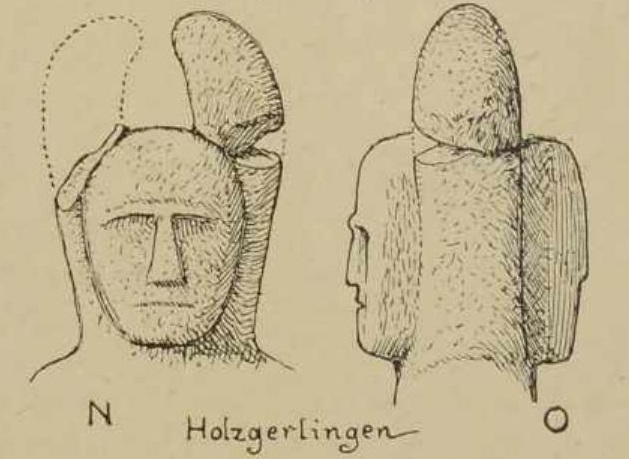
Drawing of the front and side of the Holzgerlingen figure's head, showing the original damage to its crown.

The figure is carved from sandstone local to Holzgerlingen. It measures 230cm by 32cm by 21cm.

All four sides of the stone are carved, but only the upper half of the figure's features have been rendered, beginning at the belt (although the base has a rebate carefully carved into it). Two arms, hanging from the figure's square shoulders, symmetrically wrap around the figure. On both of the broad sides, the right forearm is visible, bent horizontally over its chest. Its hand rests on the right of the figure's torso. The thumb of each hand is slightly raised. On opposite sides, identical faces are carved into the stone (hence the metonymic reference to the figure as "Janus-faced"). One side's face has suffered much worse damage than the other. The heavy eyebrows and trapezoid nose are connected in a T-shape; the eyebrows cast a deep shadow over where the eyes should be. The figure's mouth is represented by a deep, horizontal slash in the rock. The twin horns of the figure have been identified with a Celtic leaf-crown, a common La Tène motif. Unusually, in this figure, the leaf-crown appears to grow out of the shoulders. This crown was badly damaged when found and has since been restored.

== Dating and interpretation ==
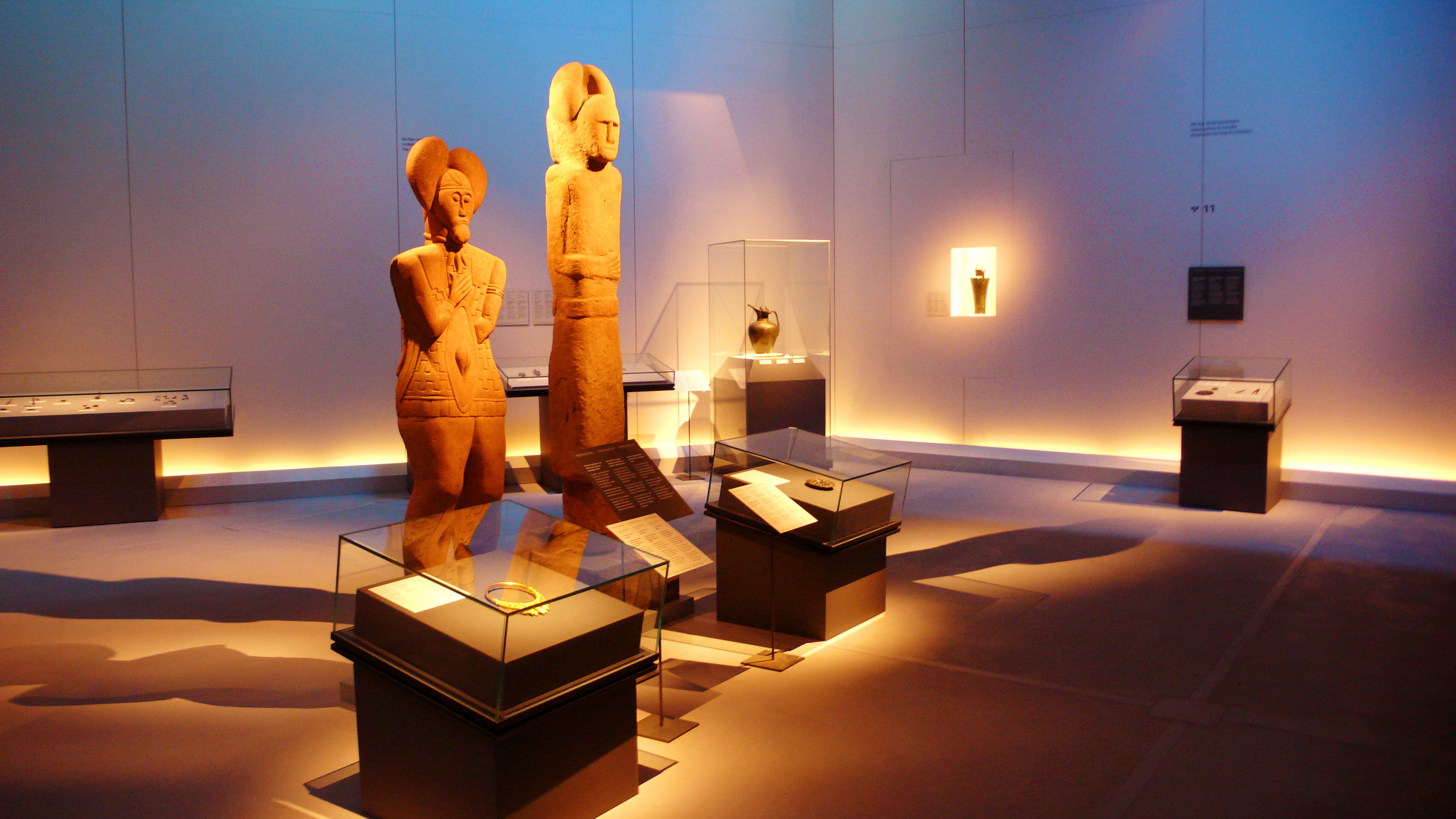
The Holzgerlingen figure besides the Glauberg prince in the Bern Historical Museum.

Originally, the date of the statue was entirely uncertain. The figure was even identified as early medieval or Slavic. Deeper understanding of Celtic sculpture in the 20th century allowed motifs, like the figure's leaf-crown, to confidently classify this figure within the La Tène culture. However, its dating within that culture is still insecure. J. V. S. Megaw calls it the "most archaic in aspect" of the La Tène sculptures known, citing such features as the T-shaped eyebrows and nose. He classifies it within the very early La Tène culture and assigns it a date between the 5th and 6th centuries BC. Paul Jacobsthal also classifies it within the early La Tène, though not as early as Megaw. However, some, such as Pieter Lambrechts, have classified it within the middle La Tène culture on the basis of stylistic similarities with contemporaneous southern French and Spanish sculptures. Such scholarship dates the stone to after the 3rd century BC. Archaeologist Josef Röder has noted marks of both pointed and flat chisels on the stone, which he claims was not possible before the Hellenistic period (that is, before the 4th century BC).

As stylistic analogues of the Holzgerlingen figure within the La Tène culture, the Hirschlanden warrior, Glauberg prince, and the Waldenbuch pillar have been especially cited. The relief arm of the Hirschlanden warrior is carved in a similar position, bent with a raised thumb. The Glauberg prince is similarly tall and wears a leaf-crown. The Waldenbuch pillar, found about 10km from the Holzgerlingen figure, is probably a bust figure like the Holzgerlingen figure but only survives as far up as a slender arm reaching around itself. The Janus head of the Holzgerlingen figure is an unusual feature. Most Iron Age statuary was intended to be viewed from only one direction. (Note: Other exceptions to this rule exist: a two-headed statue at Roquepertuse; a stone head from Badaczony-Lábdi, Badacsonytördemic; and the Heidelberg head.) The Janus head has been assumed to represent Etruscan influence on the design. Another unusual feature is its height. At 2.3m, the Holzgerlingen figure has been identified as the largest known Iron Age statue.

The statue is often suggested to have been a cult image, perhaps featuring in a Celtic shrine (akin to that found at Écury-le-Repos). Kurt Bittel suggested that the figure represents a deity, its Janus face a symbol of power and omniscience. (Note: In Bittel's words: "in der Dikephalie, mit der ja nicht zwei verschiedene Gesichter, sondern das nach zwei Richtungen und damit nach allen Horizonten orientierte Antlitz einer einzigen Person gemeint ist, sich übermenschliche Macht und Würde ausdrückt".) However, it has also been suggested that the stone crowned an Iron Age burial mound, as the Hirschlanden warrior once did.
