= Heidetrank Oppidum =

Coordinates: 50°13′15″N 8°31′19″E

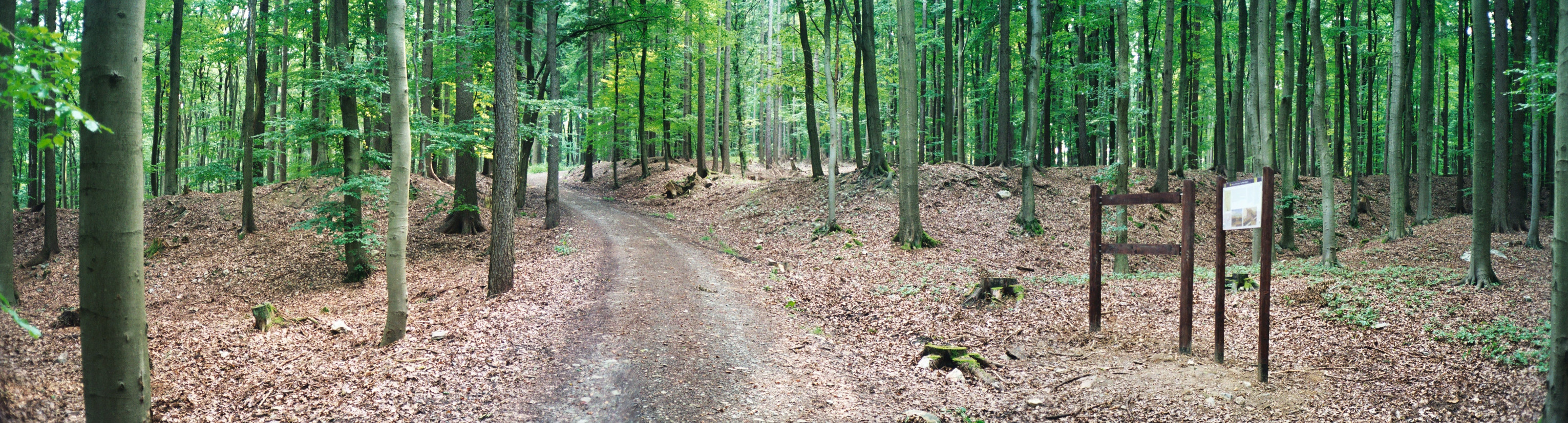
Earthworks of the Heidetraenk Oppidum, Oberursel, Germany. View from the outside on the remains of the north-eastern inturned gateway.

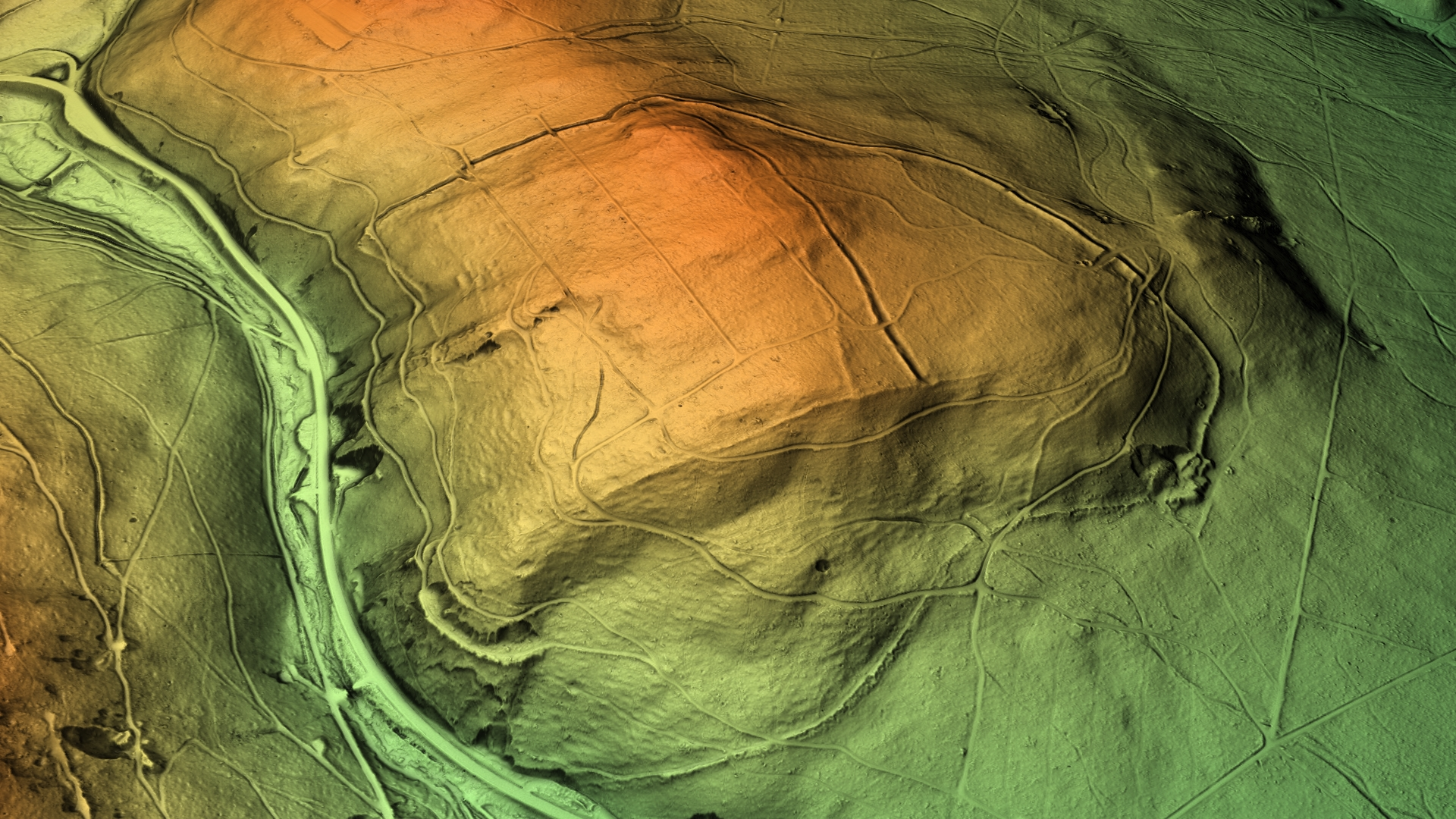
Digital imaging of the Heidetränk terrain

The Heidetränk Oppidum near Oberursel in the Taunus in Germany is one of Europe's most important Celtic oppida.

The oppidum was surrounded by ramparts which encircled the settlement of opposite sides of a ravine called the Heidetrankthal. This imposing rampart was 10 km long and had six gates. The high point of the settlement was in the late La Tène period, but lost its importance in the mid first century BC. Archaeological finds from the Heidedtrank Oppidium include agricultural implements such as plowshares, hoes, scythe and sickle blades as well as tools and Celtic coins, particularly the so-called "Nauheim Quinarius", which was probably coined in the oppidum itself.

It is considerably younger than nearby settlements at the Altkönig (5th/4th century BC) and Bleibeskopf (8th century BC).
