= Waldenbuch pillar =

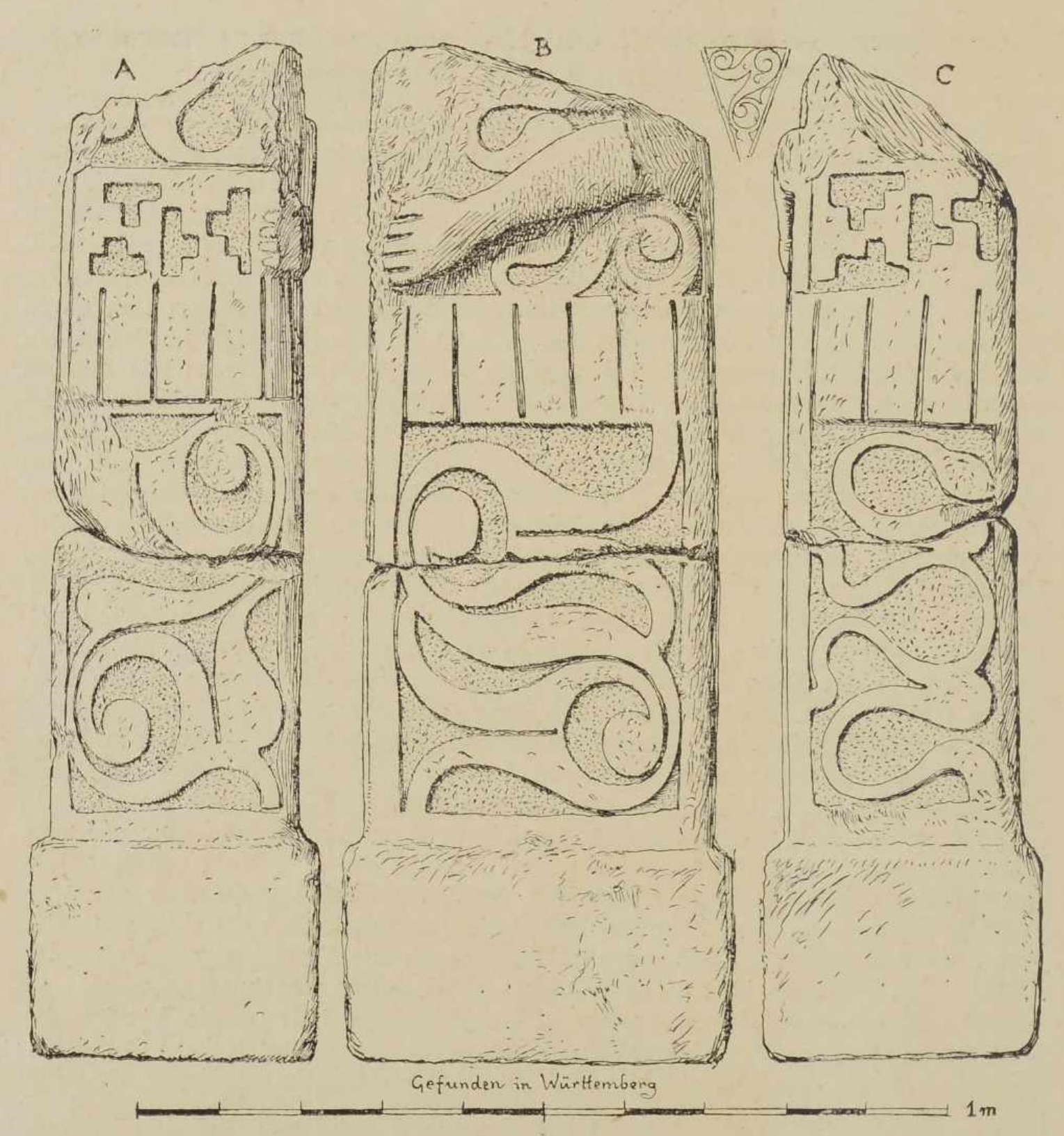
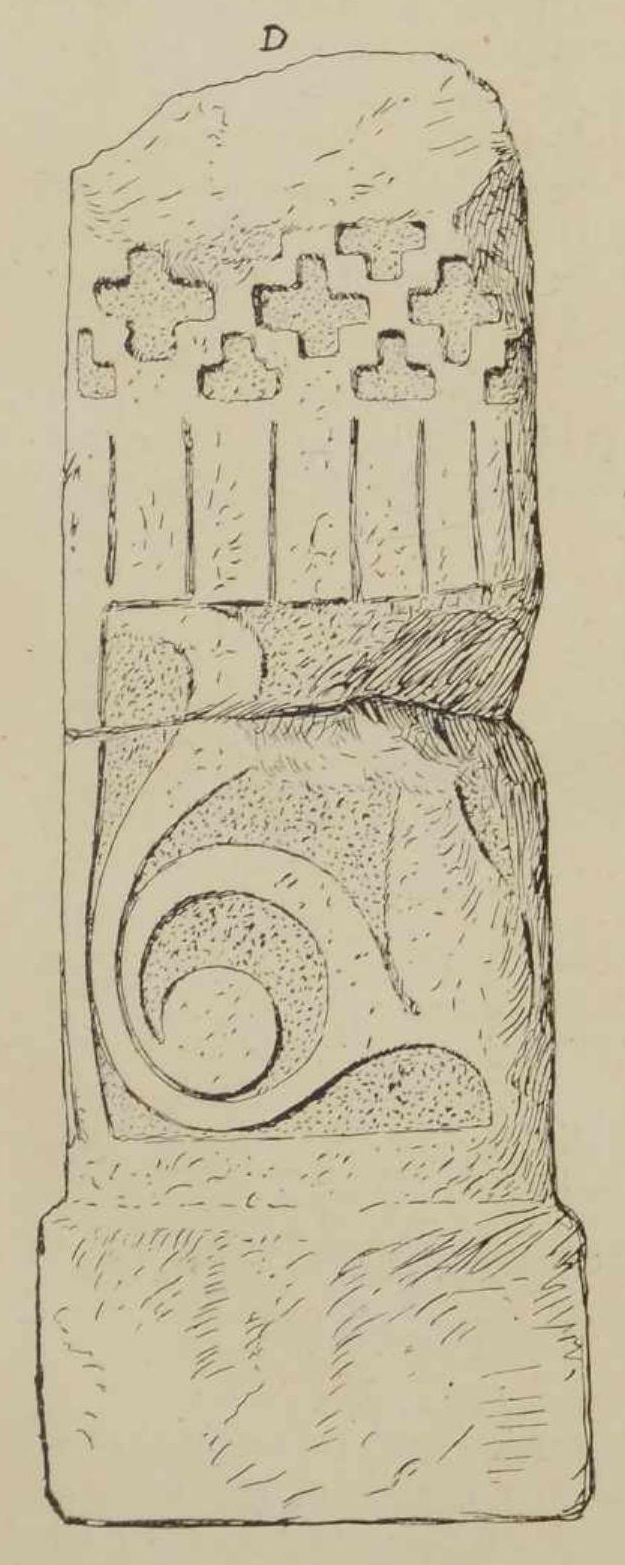
Sides A, B, C, and D of the Waldenbuch pillar. (Note: Designation of sides after Robert Knorr.)

The Waldenbuch pillar is a four-sided sandstone monument of the early to middle La Tène culture. The pillar, which probably originally extended to an anthropomorphic bust akin to the Holzgerlingen figure, only survives in a fragmentary form. It is presently at the Landesmuseum Württemberg.

== Discovery ==
The Waldenbuch pillar was found in the forest of Greuthau in 1864. The find spot is not far from the Schlösslesmühle and from the town of Waldenbuch. It was found 2km from the La Tène archeological site of Federlesmad near Echterdingen, and only 10km from the supposed findspot of the Holzgerlingen figure. The pillar was thereafter placed in the Kunstkammer of the local duke. The stone is now in the collection of the Landesmuseum Württemberg.

== Description ==
The pillar is made from made from Stubensandstein, a kind of local sandstone. The pillar is four-sided and measures 125cm by 47cm by 27cm. The stonemasonry has been described as of "astonishing quality" (Note: Original German: "erstaunlicher Qualität".) for the period.

The pillar has a 25cm tall rectangular base, which juts slightly further out than the rest of the pillar. Above the base is a 65cm section on which tendril-like, curvilinear designs have been carved in relief. Each side of the pillar has its own relief, separated by framed edges. On sides A, B, and D these designs curve (lyre-like) into lobes. On side C the designs are much more slender. Above this section is a 15cm tall band of upright rectangles (separated by vertical gashes) encompassing the pillar. Above the band on sides A, C, and D, a mixture of cross and T-shaped designs are carved. On side B, a human forearm is visible, with the fingers curling around to grip side A. The forearm on side A is backgrounded by more lobed curvilinear designs. Lobed curvilinear designs also appear above the T-shape designs on side A. Nothing above this is visible due to uneven damage to the top half of the pillar.

== Dating and interpretation ==
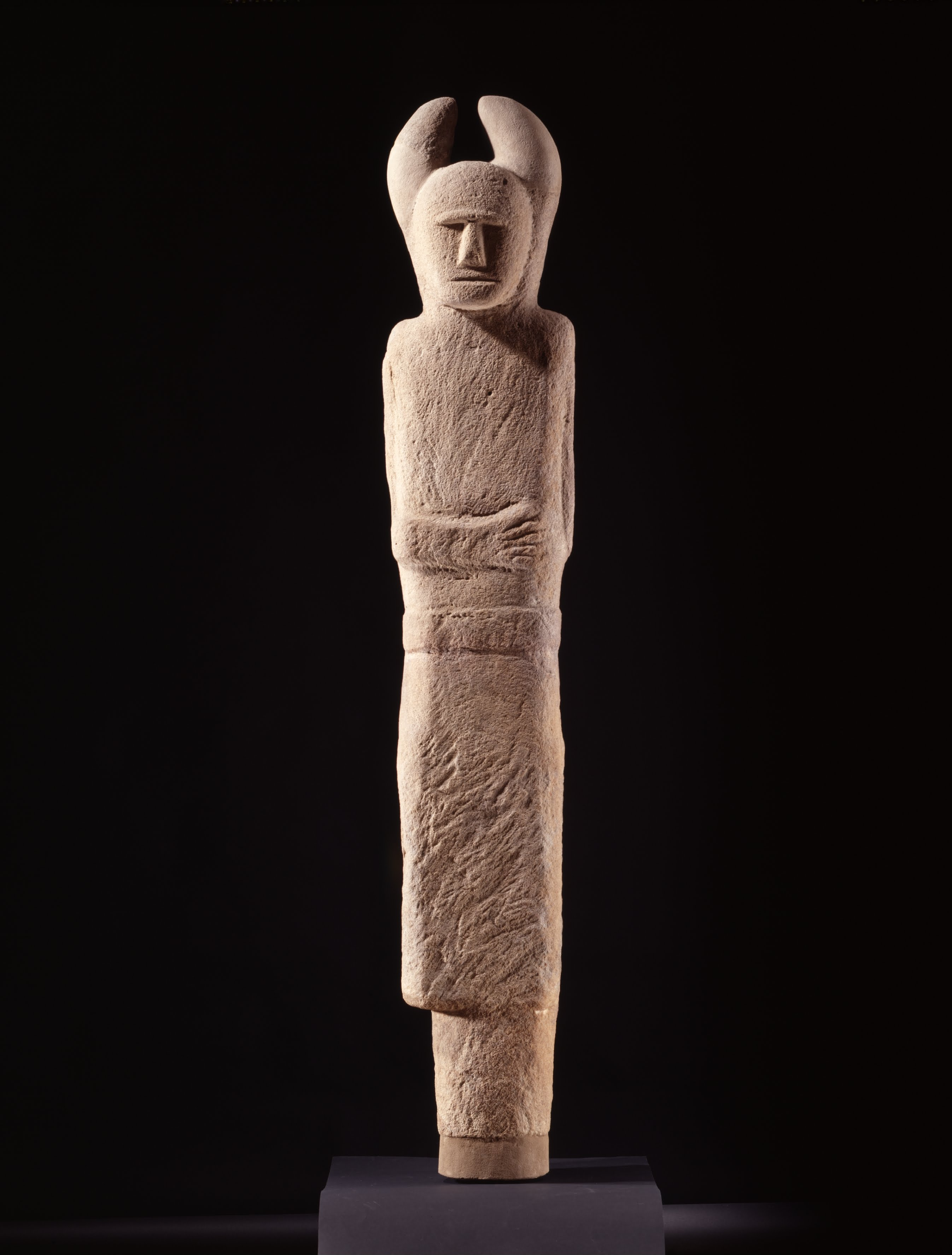
The Waldenbuch pillar has often been compared with the Holzgerlingen figure.

The pillar has been securely classified within the La Tène period, but much like the Holzgerlingen figure its dating within that culture is not secure. Paul Reinecke dated it to the middle La Tène on the basis of a perceived similarity between the lyre-like curvilinear designs on the pillar and those on some middle La Tène Yugoslavian scabbards. Paul Jacobsthal classifies it within the early La Tène period and J. V. S. Megaw conjectures a similar date, between the 4th and 3rd centuries BC, on the basis of the slender tendrils which recall the early La Tène Waldalgesheim style and other such analogies of design elements. However, Megaw calls his dating "by no means obligatory", noting that such an early date as his means that the pillar "constitute[s] a unique piece for the period." Design elements do not allow a secure dating, as prehistorian Wolfgang Kimmig has noted; elements of the pillar, like the decorative T's and crosses, appear as far back as the pre-La Tène Hallstatt culture. Archaeologist Josef Röder has noted marks of both pointed and flat chisels on the stone, which he claims was not possible before the Hellenistic period (that is, before the 4th century BC).

Given the proximity of the find spots and the resemblance between the arms of the Waldenbuch pillar and the Holzgerlingen figure, the two stones have often been compared to one another. Though there is no direct information about the upper half of the pillar, if it carried on into an anthropomorphic bust as the Holzgerlingen figure does we can make some deductions about the lower half. T. G. E. Powell has suggested that the curvilinear designs are to be interpreted as folds in the figure's lower garment and the band of rectangles is to be interpreted as a belt or square-cut cape. Unlike the (dicephalic) Holzgerlingen figure, arms are visible on only one side, so it is not safe to assume the original figure was two-faced.

== See also ==
- Pfalzfeld obelisk
