= Warrior of Hirschlanden =

Ancient statue

Coordinates: 48°49′59″N 9°00′40″E

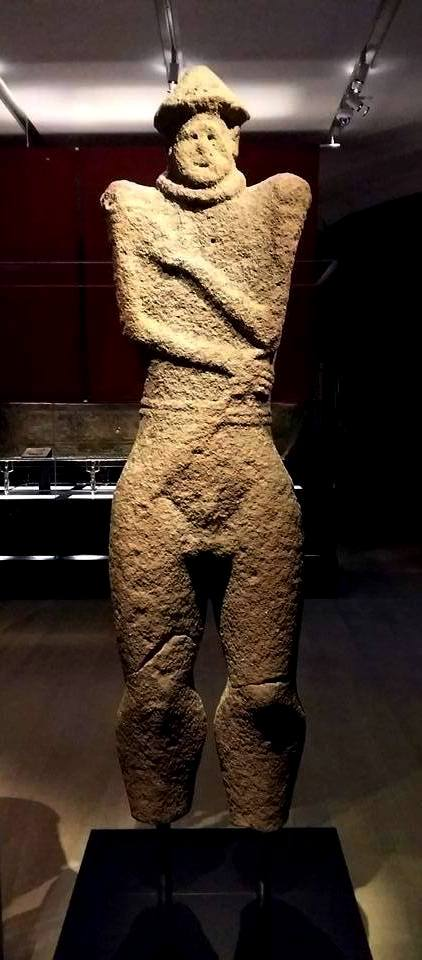
- Material: Sandstone
- Height: 1.5 meters
- Created: 6th century BC
- Discovered: 1963; Ditzingen, Baden-Württemberg, Germany
- Present location: Stuttgart, Baden-Württemberg, Germany

The Warrior of Hirschlanden (German: Krieger von Hirschlanden) is a statue of a warrior made of sandstone, the oldest known Iron Age life-size anthropomorphic statue north of the Alps. It was a production of the Hallstatt culture, probably dating to the 6th century BC. It is now in the Württembergisches Landesmuseum in Stuttgart, with a copy at the Hirschlanden site (now Ditzingen, Baden-Württemberg, Germany), where it was found. The preserved height is 1.50 m, but the feet have been broken off.

== Description ==
The warrior wears a torc (neck-ring), a belt with a typical late Hallstatt dagger, and a pointed hat, possibly made (as with the real hat in the princely grave of Hochdorf) of birchbark.

While the legs are modelled with some realism, the upper body is rather schematic and the face is extremely sketchy, leading to speculation that the man might be intended to be seen as wearing a mask, as is known from burials in Klein-Klein, Styria, Austria, Trebeništa (North Macedonia) and the much earlier shaft-graves of Mycenae, c. 1500 BC.

The statue shows significant weathering, suggesting that it stood exposed to the elements for a long time before being buried. Other anthropomorphic statues of the early Iron Age have been found in Rottenburg, Tübingen, Stammheim and Stockach (all Baden-Württemberg, Germany), but they are far more stylised, more carving than statue. In the following La Tène period, anthropomorphic statues are still very rare, but examples include the finds from Glauberg (Hessen, Germany), Holzgerlingen figure (Baden-Württemberg, Germany), the Mšecké Žehrovice Head (Czech Republic), and the sculptures at Roquepertuse.

Greek influence (kouroi) has been discussed. Numerous black figure vessels from fortified settlements of the period attest trading contacts with the Mediterranean, probably via the Rhône River and the Greek colony of Massilia (Marseille). Much closer stylistic connections exist with the far more elaborate statues from Capestrano, Picenium, Italy (550 BC) and Casale Marittimo, Etruria (middle of the 7th century BC).

== History ==
The statue was found in Hirschlanden (now Ditzingen, Baden-Württemberg, Germany) in 1963 when a low barrow was excavated. The barrow was surrounded by a stone circle and a dry stone wall. It contained 16 burials, ranging from the very beginning of the Iron Age (Hallstatt D1, c. 600 BC) to the beginning of the Late Iron Age (La Tène period, c. 450 BC). The statue was found north of the barrow, but is supposed to have been originally placed on the top.

== Literature ==
- Piceni, Popolo d'Europa (Roma, Edizioni de Luca 1999).
- Sabine Rieckhoff, Jörg Biel et al., Die Kelten in Deutschland (Stuttgart, Theiss 2001). ISBN 3-8062-1367-4
