= Bleibeskopf =

Coordinates: 50°15′09″N 8°32′05″E

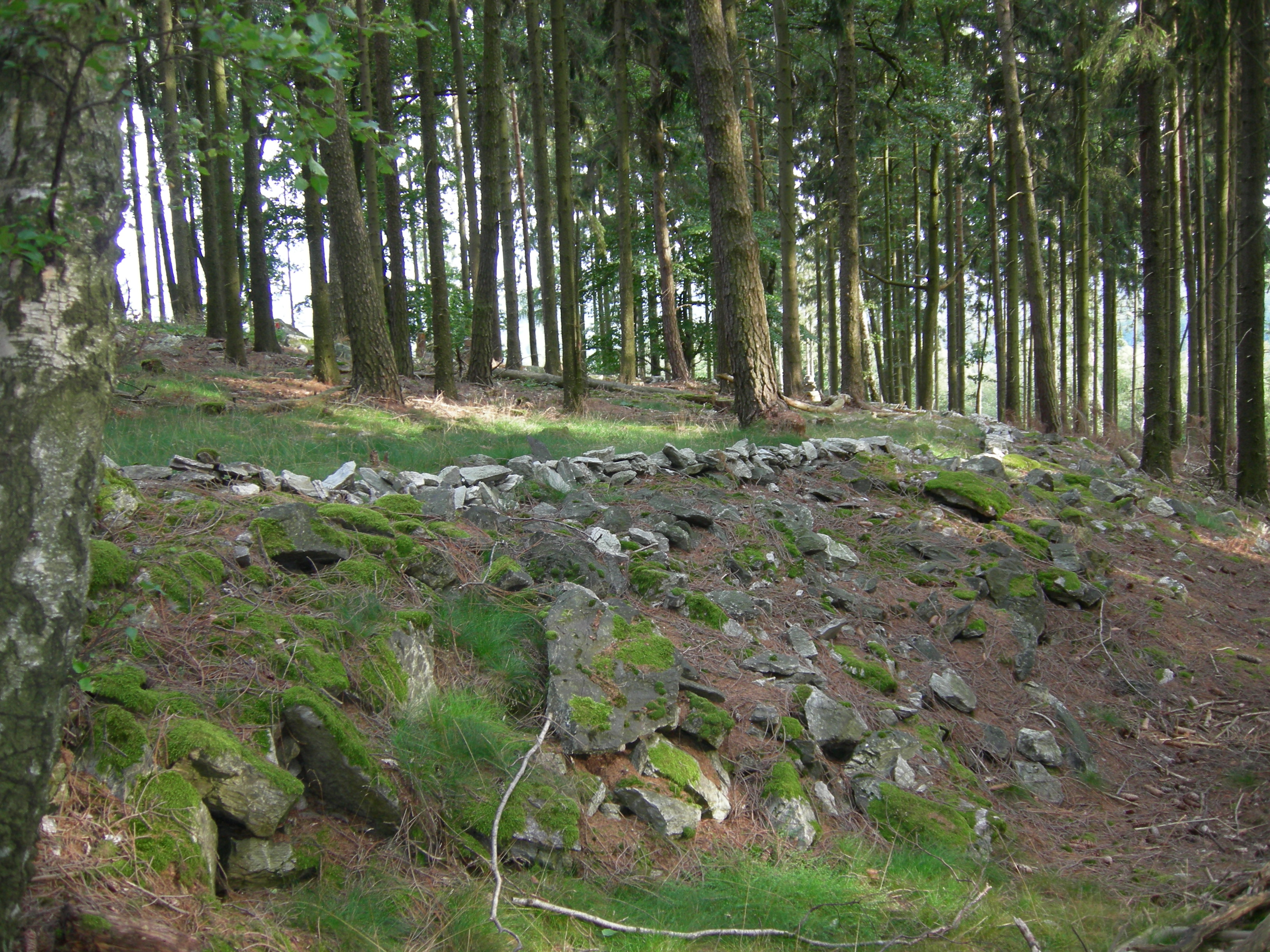
- Remains of ramparts on the Bleibeskopf

Highest point
- Elevation: 480 m (1,570 ft)

Geography
- Location: Hesse, Germany
- Parent range: Taunus

The Bleibeskopf is a hill in Hesse, Germany, about 6 km northwest of Bad Homburg.

In the late Bronze Age (about 800 BC), a pre-Celtic hillfort of the Urnfield culture was on the Bleibiskopf. The circular rampart, which was once 3 to 3.5 metres thick, about 1.8 metres tall and 490 metres long, is still recognisable today. Numerous bronze objects have been found on the Bleibeskopf: a hatchet, a decorated lance tip, a knife, a needle, a razor and leg rings.
