= Celtic stone idols =

Northern European stone sculptures

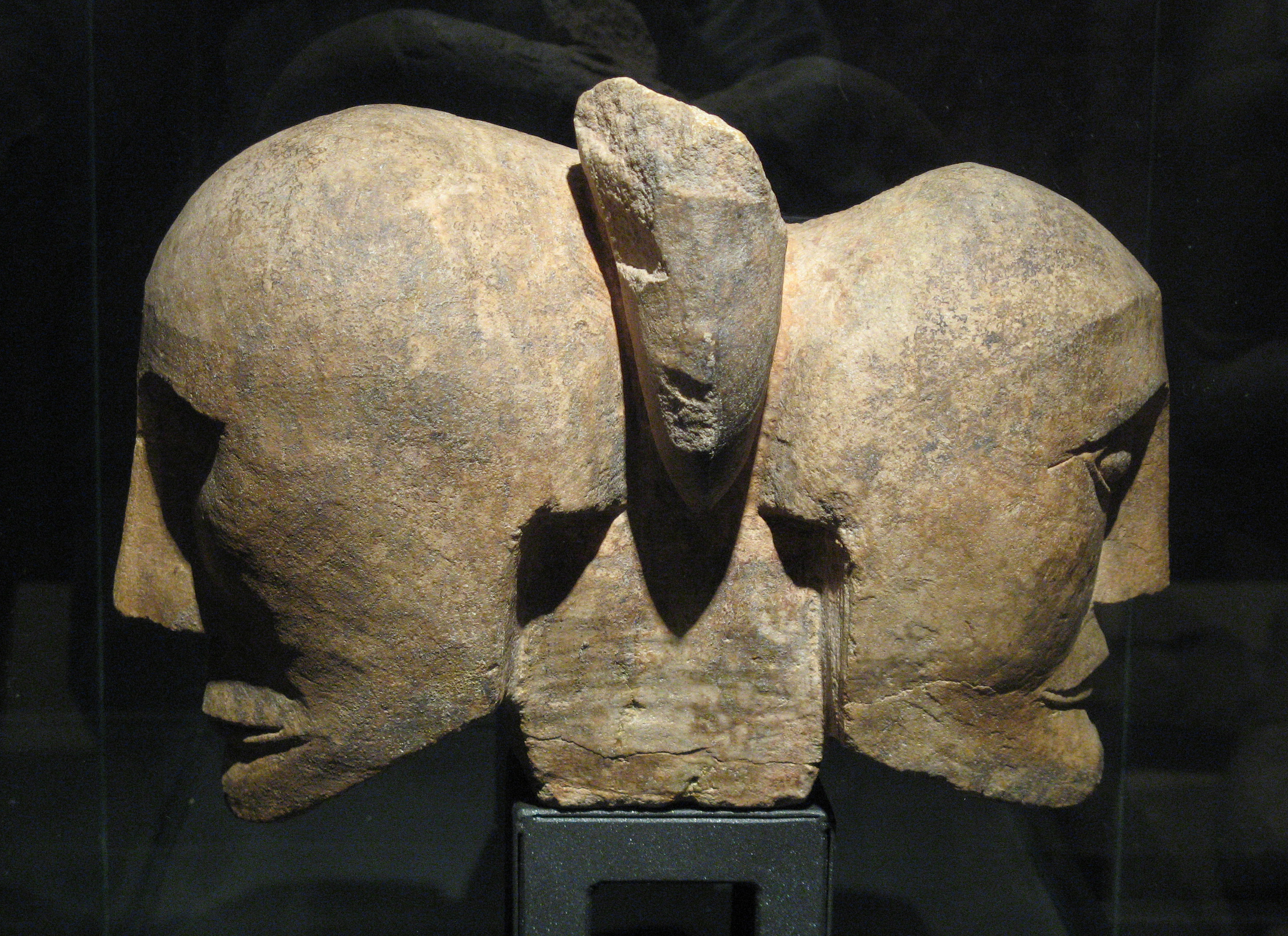
Tricephalic head found at Roquepertuse, a major Celtic religious centre dated to the 3rd century BC

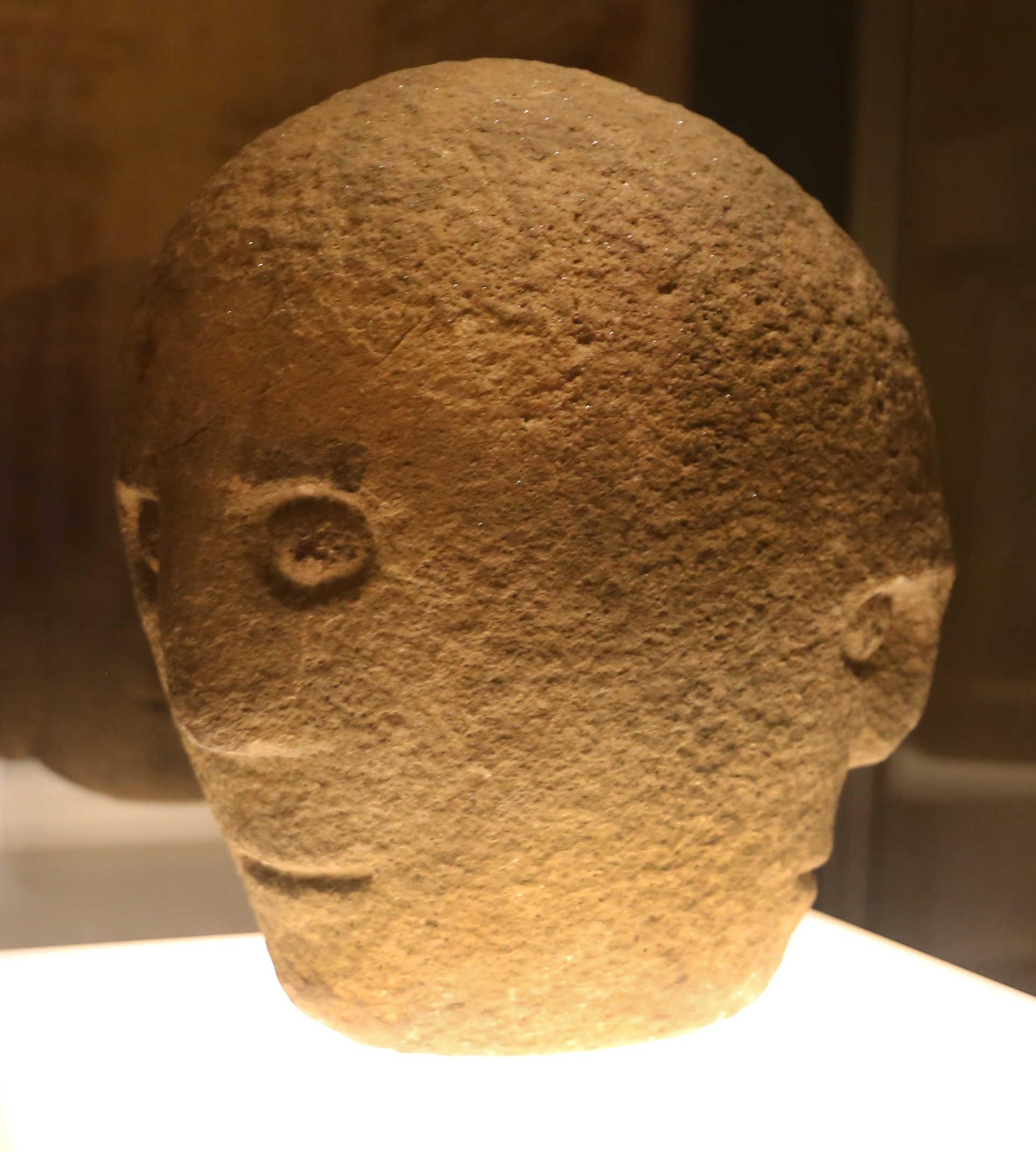
The three faced Corleck Head, Irish, 1st century AD

Celtic stone idols are Northern European stone sculptures dated to the northern continent's Iron Age, that are believed to represent Celtic gods. The majority contain one or more human heads, which may have one or more faces. It is thought that the heads were often placed on top of pillar stones and were a centrepiece at cultic worship sites. The sculptures are found across Northern Europe but are most numerous in Gaul (roughly today's France, Belgium and Luxembourg) and Britain and Ireland, with the majority dating to the Romano-British (between 43 and 410 AD) and Gallo-Roman periods. Thus, they are sometimes described as a result of cultural exchange between abstract Celtic art and the Roman tradition of monumental stone carving. Parallels are found in contemporary Scandinavia.

The faces tend to share several characteristics, including unsophisticated or crude features such as closely set eyes, a long face, broad noses or a slit mouth. Praising this simplicity, the scholar Paul Jacobsthal described the idols as bearing "the mark of Greek humanity, shining through primitiveness and weirdness". A small number of similar, usually earlier, wooden idols have survived, including the Braak Bog Figures (2nd or 3rd century BC, Northern Germany ) and the Ralaghan Idol (c. 1000 BC, Ireland).

== Origin and development ==
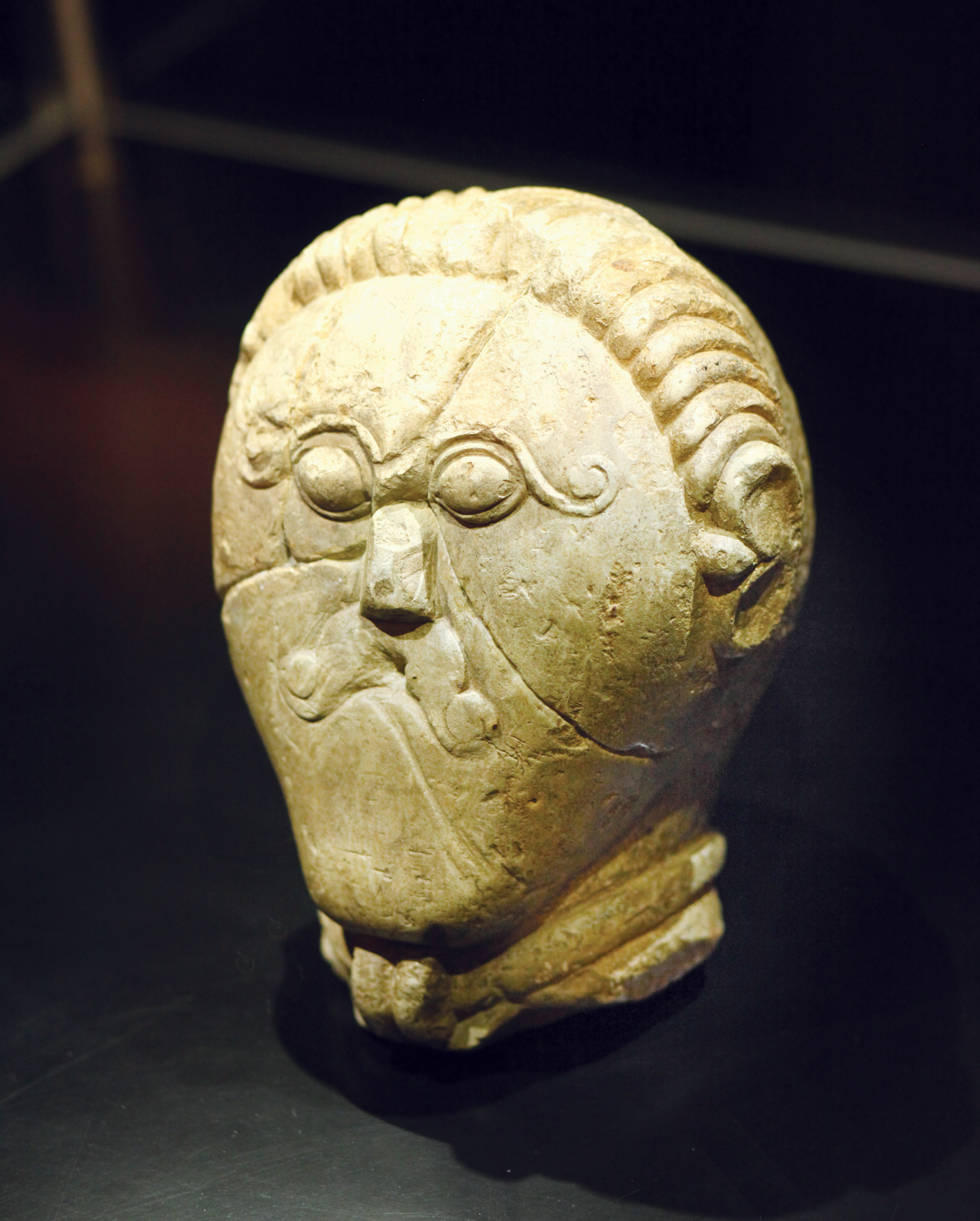
The Mšecké Žehrovice Head, Bohemia, c. 150–50 BC

The earliest European stone idols appeared in the Nordic countries during the late Bronze Age, where they continued to be produced, including in Iceland, until the end of the Viking Age in the 11th century AD. The very early examples resemble contemporary full-length wooden figures. Both types are assumed to have been created for cultic sites, but early examples are rare, especially in wood. Only around eight prehistoric Nordic stone heads are known to have survived.

The type spread across Northern Europe, with the most numerous examples appearing in the northeast and southeast of Gaul (notably at Roquepertuse, a major Celtic religious center near Marseille, France) and across the northern British Isles during the Romano-British period. Most scholars believe that the heads were a combination of non-representational abstract Celtic art and the monumentalism of Roman sculpture

== Dating ==
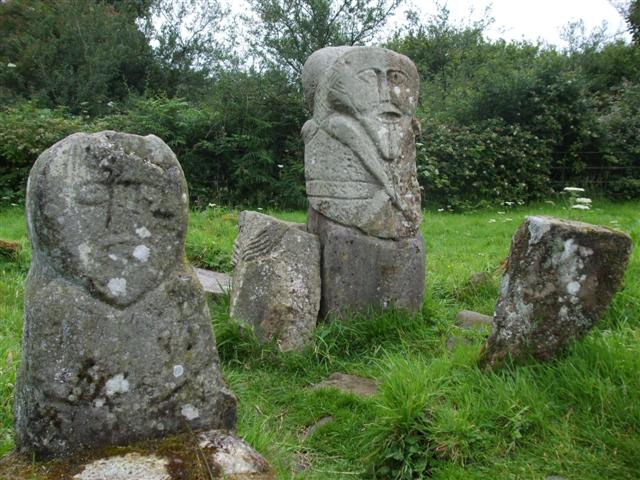
The Boa Island figures, c. 400 – c. 800 AD

Dating stone sculpture is difficult as techniques such as radiocarbon dating cannot be used. The heads are thus usually dated based on stylistic similarities to works whose dating has been established. However, this approach has been challenged by the writer John Billingsley, who points out that there was a folk art revival of stone head carvings in the early modern period.

Although many of the heads are believed to be pre-Christian, others have since been identified as either from the Early Middle Ages or examples of 17th- or 18th-century folk art. Thus modern archaeologists date such objects based on their resemblance to other known examples in the contemporary Northern European context.

== Function ==
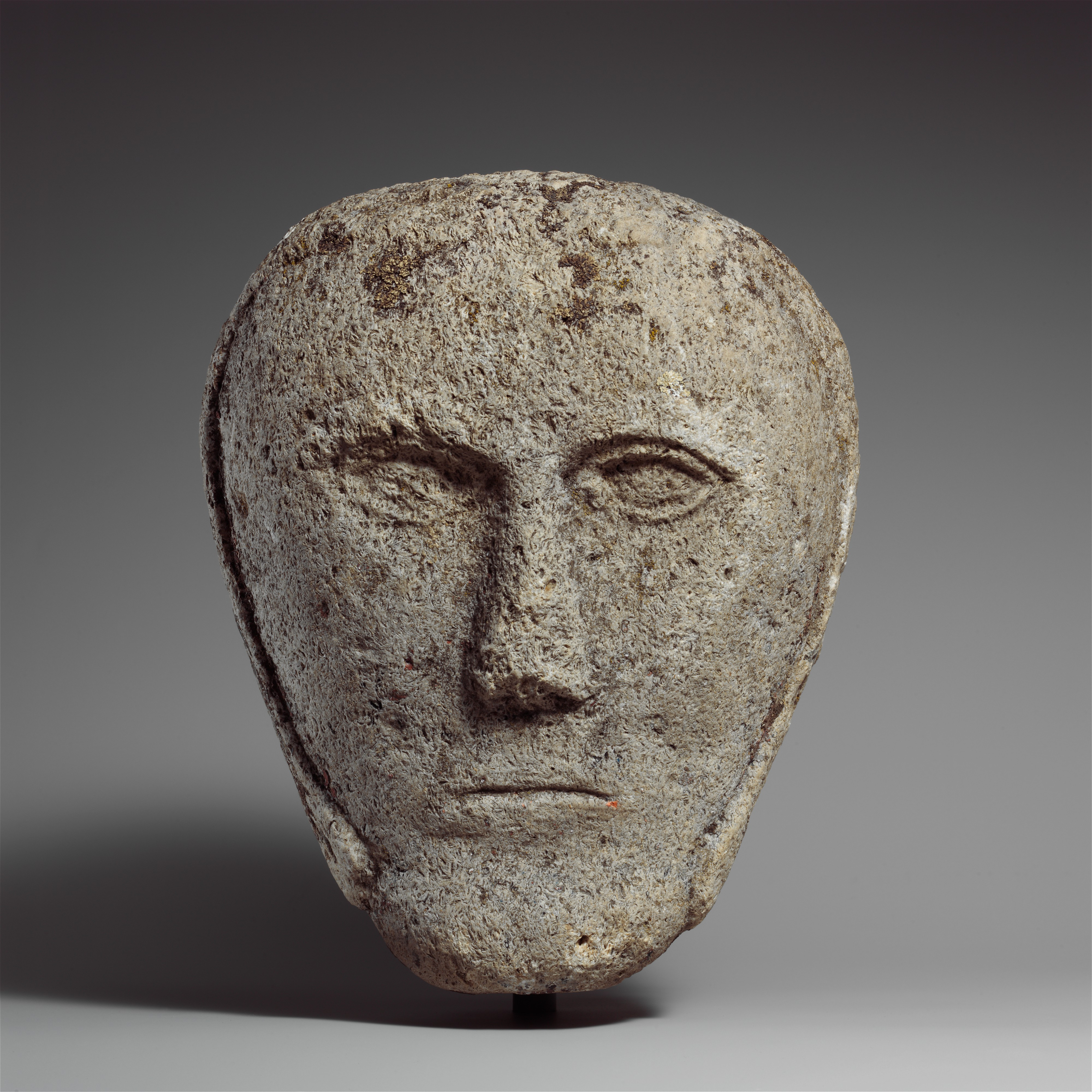
Head of a man wearing a cap or helmet, English, possibly c. 2nd or 3rd century AD

Archaeologists believe that the pre-Christian stone idols were intended as centerpieces for worship sites. A majority of the surviving examples were rediscovered near sacred wells, rivers or trees. On the British Isles especially, these locations were typically adapted by early Christians for churches and monasteries.

Many of the Celtic era stone carvings are of human heads, sometimes with multiple faces or heads. The modern consensus, first articulated by the historian Anne Ross, is that the Celts venerated the head as a "symbol of divinity" and believed it to be "the seat of the soul". Classical Greek and Roman sources mention that Celtic peoples practised headhunting and used the severed heads of their enemies as war trophies, and would, in the words of Ross, "tie them to the necks of their horses, bearing them home in triumph...the more severed heads a warrior possessed the greater was his reputation as a hero." According to both the Greek historian Posidonius and the geographer Strabo, the Gauls returned from battle with their enemies' heads hanging from the necks of their horses, before nailing them outside their homes. Strabo recorded that heads of noble enemies were embalmed in cedar oil and "exhibited to strangers".

There are numerous Insular Celtic—(that is, Celts living in Great Britain and Ireland) myths in which severed but living heads preside over feasts and/or speak prophecies. Medieval Irish legends recount severed heads returning to life when placed on standing stones or pillars. This has led to speculation as to the existence of a Celtic head cult. Decapitated human skulls have been found at Iron Age sites associated with rituals and sacrifice, such as those at Loughnashade, County Armagh. While the Roman and Insular accounts resemble others from contemporary Britain and mainland Europe, the Irish vernacular records were mostly set down by Christian monks who would have had, according to the folklorist Dáithí Ó hÓgáin, theological reasons to slant the oral traditions in an unfavourable light compared to their own beliefs.

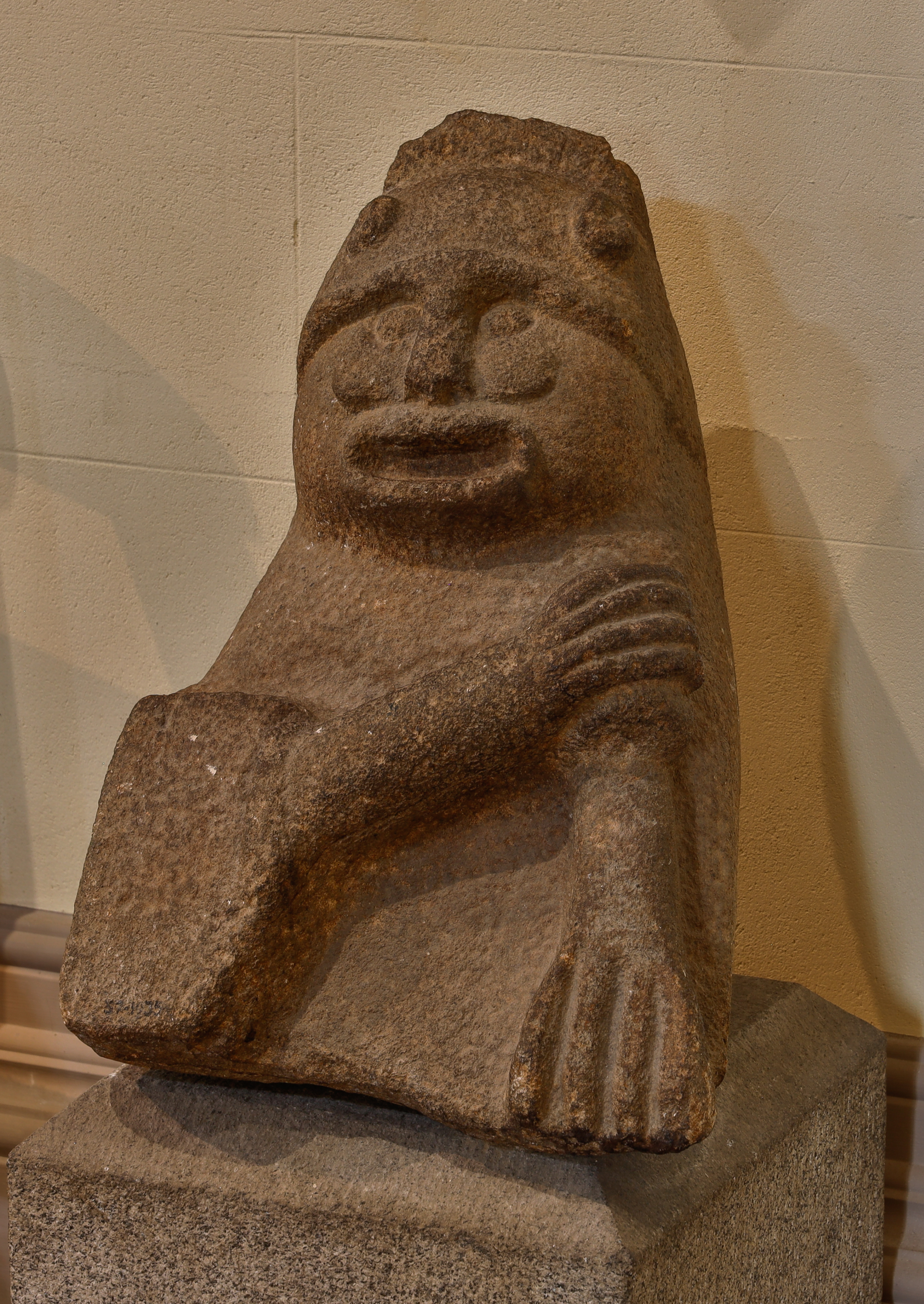
The horned and brutish Tandragee Idol, Irish, c. 1000 BC

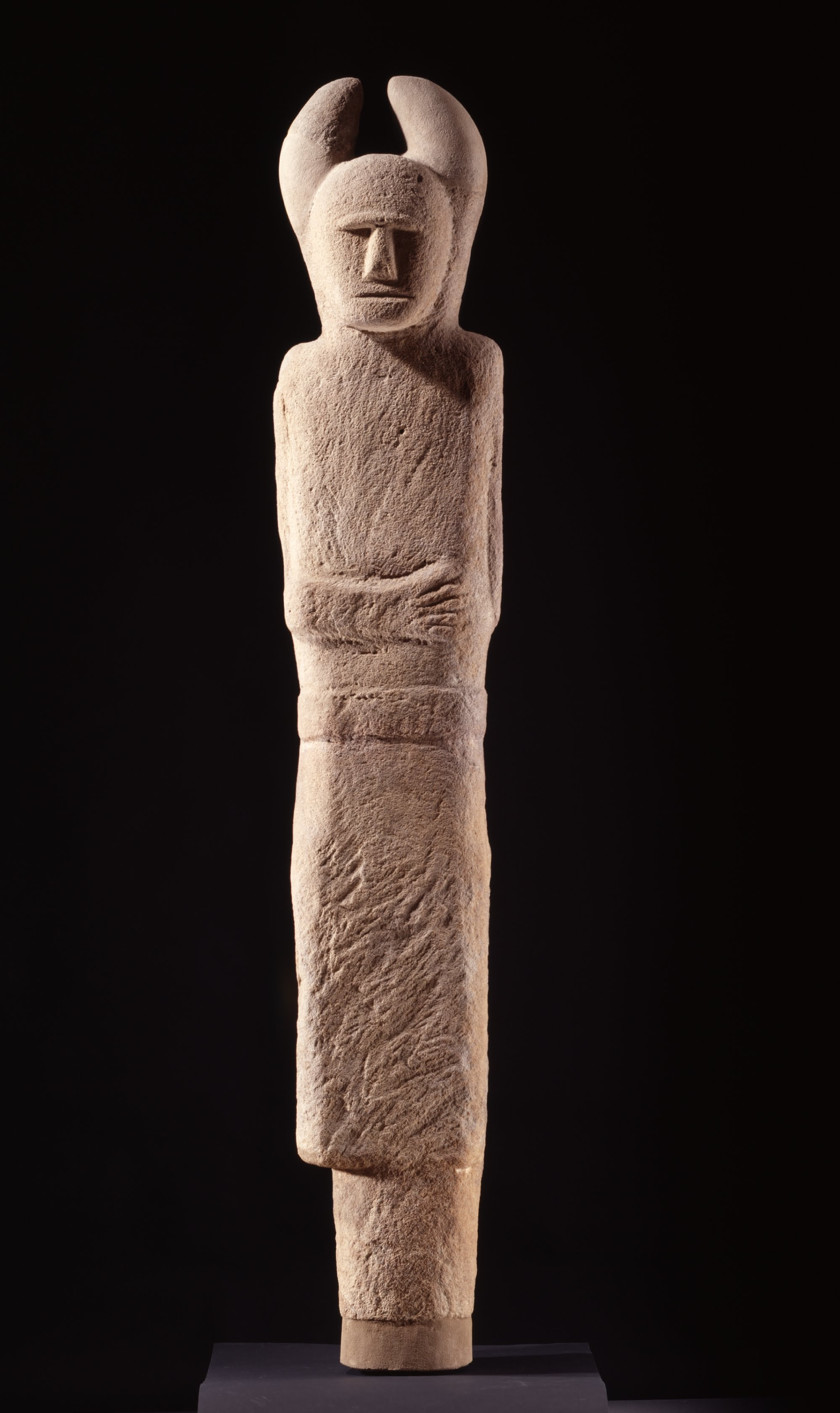
The large Janus Holzgerlingen figure. Middle-La Tène period. Landesmuseum Württemberg, Germany

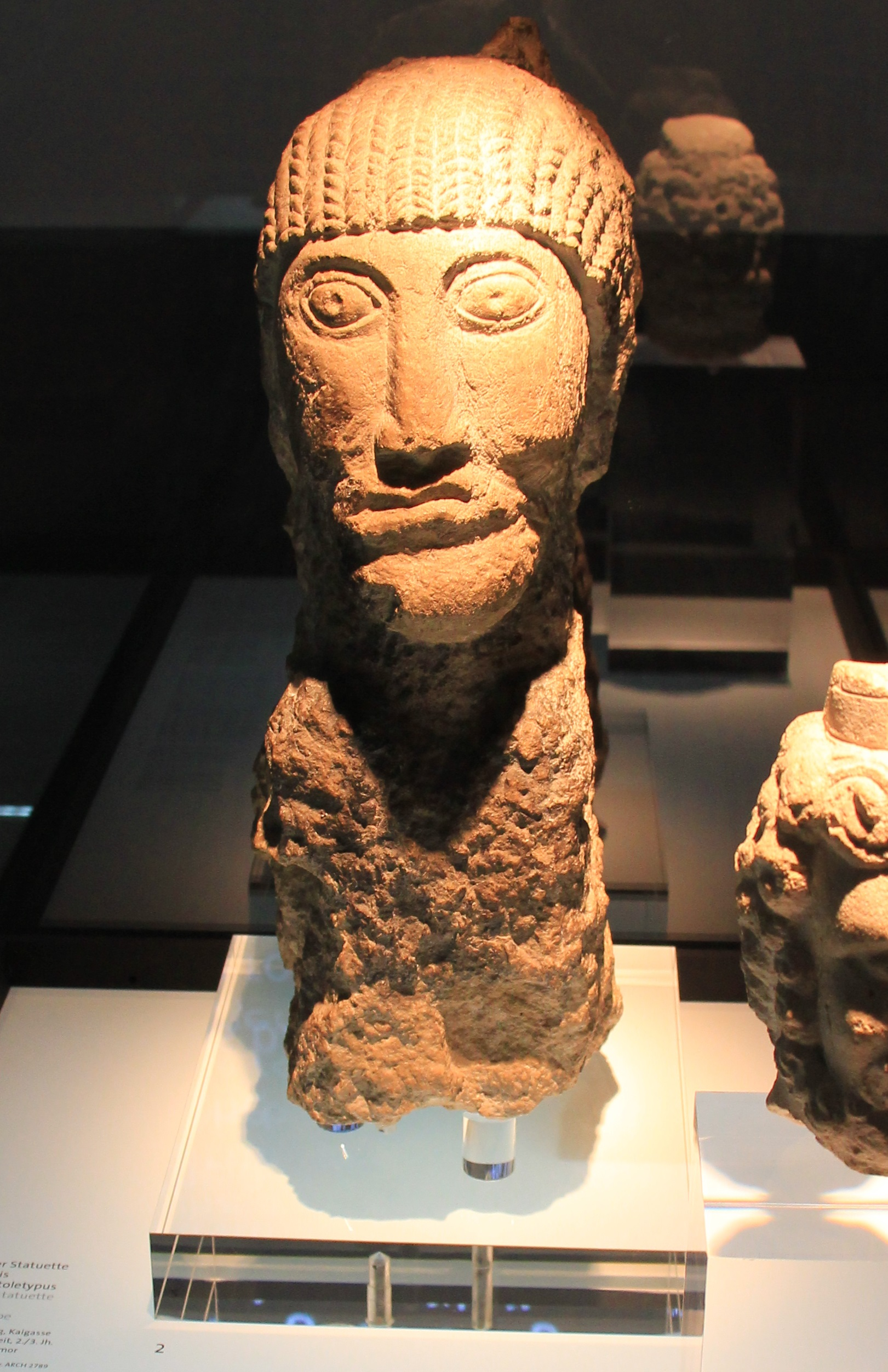
The marble Hohensalzburg head, Salzburg Museum, Austria. 1st century AD

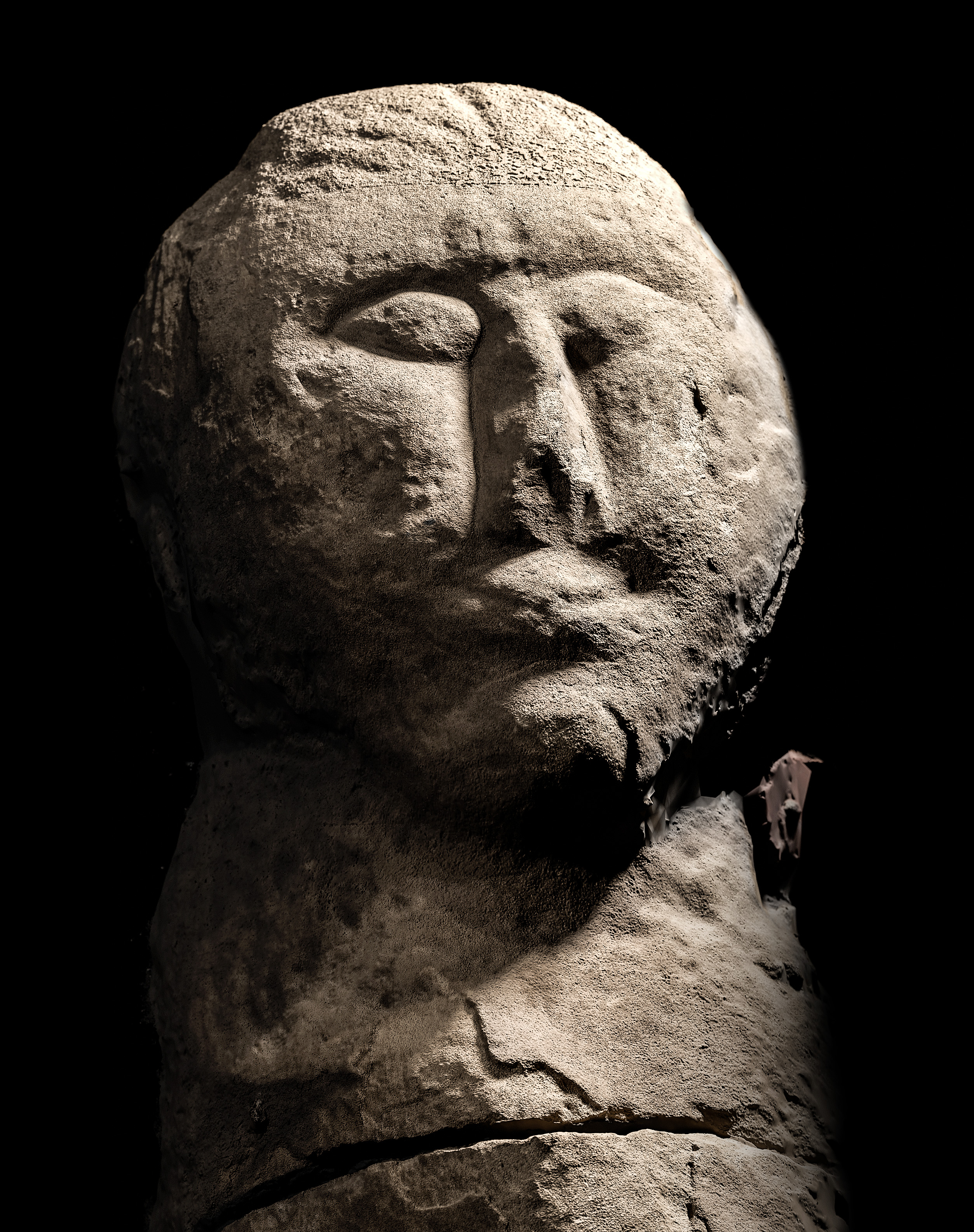
The Huntcliff Figure, North Yorkshire, England

== Polycephalic heads ==
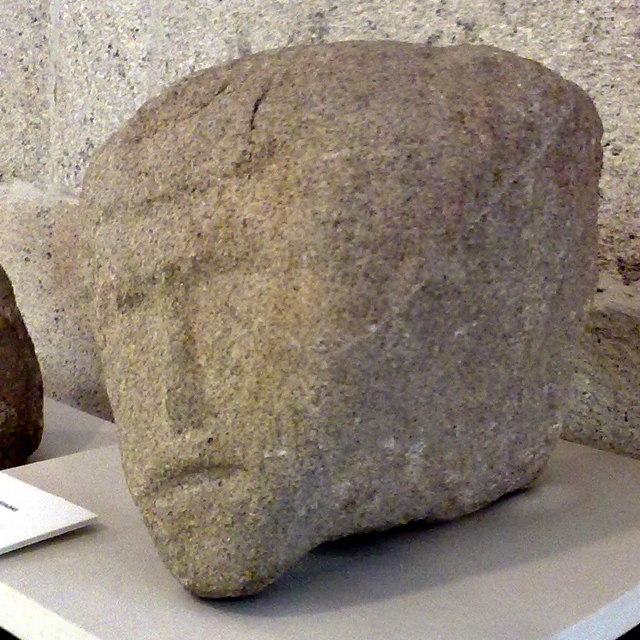
Double faced stone head, Castro Culture, today's Iberian Peninsula

The number three seems to have had a special significance to Roman-period Celts, both in Gaul and on the British Isles. Three-headed figures are a common feature of Celtic art, especially of Gaulish origin, and according to the archaeologist Anne Ross had a religious significance "fundamental" to early Celtic outlook. The concept was likely imported to Britain and Ireland Celts by the Guals during the pre-Roman period, with the Rimi altar becoming a major influence on Insular Celtic art. Sculptures from the period often show deities with either three faces or heads, while sacred animals such as lambs have three rather than two horns. The British Isles already had a mythological tradition of triple Mother goddesses such as the Irish gods Danu, Macha and Boann.

From surviving artefacts, it can be assumed that both multi-headed (as with the Irish "Dreenan" figure on Boa Island and the Corraghy Heads) or multi-faced idols were a common part of Celtic iconography. Archaeologists assume such figures to represent all-knowing and all-seeing gods, that probably symbolised the unity of the past, present and future.

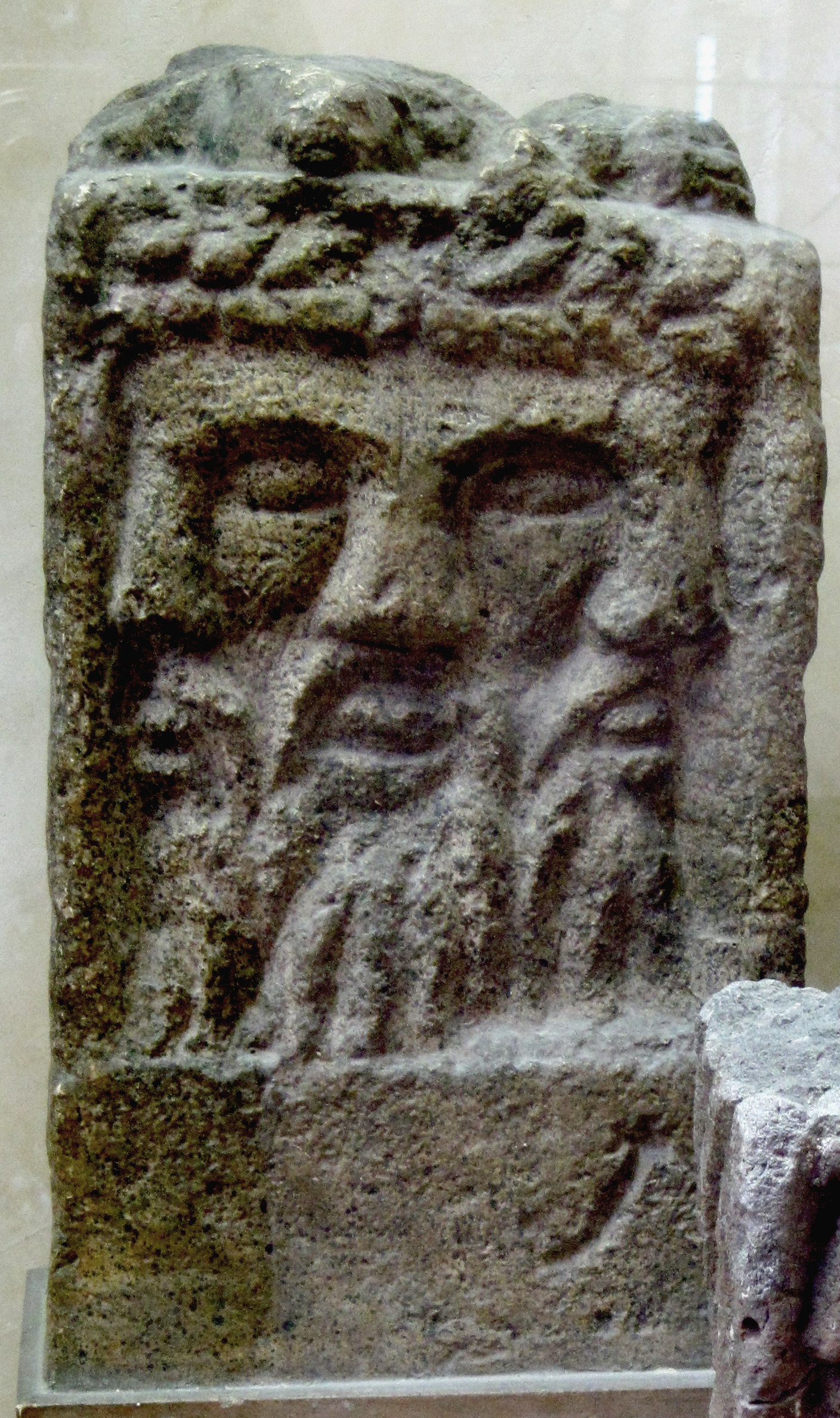
Three-headed altar from Reims, France

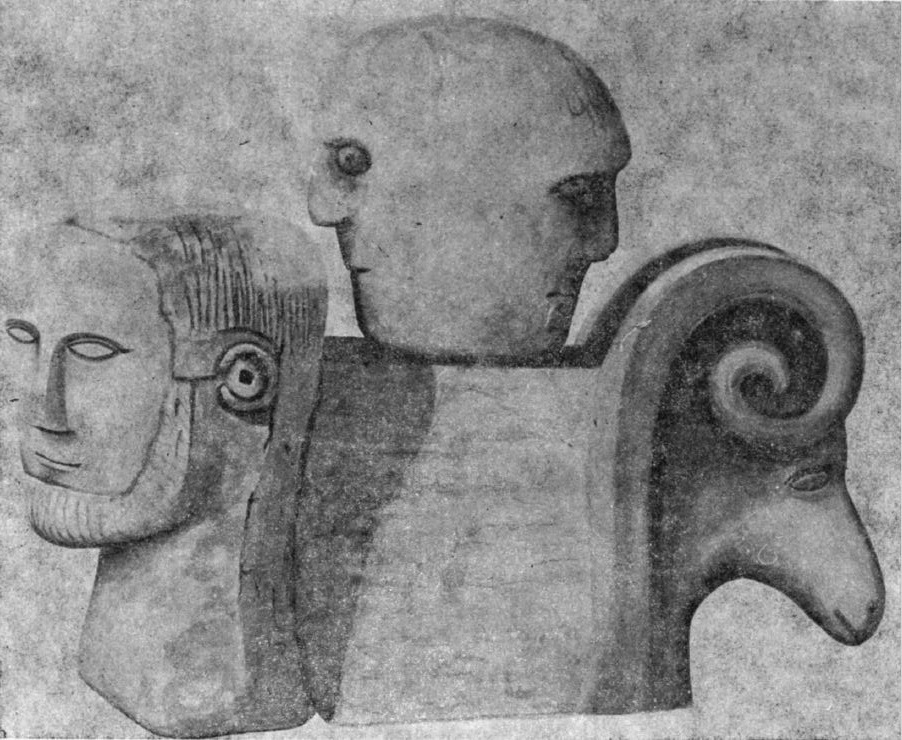
Speculative drawing of the Corraghy Heads. Irish, 1st century AD

== See also ==
- Ancient Celtic religion
- Celtic leaf-crown
- Buste-socle
- Iron Age wooden cult figures
- Anthropomorphic wooden cult figurines of Central and Northern Europe
- La Tène culture
- Celtic art

== Sources ==
- Aldhouse-Green, Miranda. The Celtic Myths: A Guide to the Ancient Gods and Legends. London: Thames and Hudson, 2015. ISBN 978-0-5002-5209-3
- Armit, Ian. Headhunting and the Body in Iron Age Europe. Cambridge University Press, 2012. ISBN 978-0-5218-7756-5
- Eogan, George; Herity, Michael. Ireland in Prehistory. London: Routledge, 2013. ISBN 978-1-3158-8762-3
- Kelly, Eamonn. "The Iron Age". In Ó Floinn, Raghnall; Wallace, Patrick (eds). Treasures of the National Museum of Ireland: Irish Antiquities. Dublin: National Museum of Ireland, 2002. ISBN 978-0-7171-2829-7
- Kelly, Eamonn. "The Archaeology of Ireland 3: The Pagan Celts". Ireland Today, no. 1006, 1984. ISSN 0332-0103
- Koch, John. Celtic Culture: A Historical Encyclopedia. New York: ABC-CLIO, 2006. ISBN 978-1-8510-9440-0
- Hawkes, C.F.C. "Reviewed Work: Early Celtic Art by Paul Jacobsthal". The Journal of Roman Studies, volume 37, parts 1 and 2, 1947. JSTOR 298471
- Lanigan Wood, Helen. "Dogs and Celtic Deities: Pre-Christian Stone Carvings in Armagh". Irish Arts Review Yearbook, vol. 16, 2000. JSTOR 20493105
- Newell, A.N. "Gallo-Roman Religious Sculpture". Greece & Rome, volume 3, number 8, February 1934. JSTOR 640758
- Ross, Anne. The Pagan Celts. Denbighshire: John Jones, 1998. ISBN 978-1-8710-8361-3
- Ross, Anne. Druids: Preachers of Immortality. Cheltenham: The History Press, 2010. ISBN 978-0-7524-1433-1
- Ross, Anne. "A Celtic Three-faced Head from Wiltshire". Antiquity volume 41, 1967. ISSN 0003-598X
- Ross, Anne. "The Human Head in Insular Pagan Celtic Religion Archived 2024-12-04 at the Wayback Machine". Proceedings of the Society of Antiquaries of Scotland, vol. 91, 1960. ISSN 2056-743X
- Rynne, Etienn. "Celtic Stone Idols in Ireland". In: Thomas, Charles. The Iron Age in the Irish Sea province: papers given at a C.B.A. conference held at Cardiff, January 3 to 5, 1969 Archived 2023-02-02 at the Wayback Machine. London: Council for British Archaeology, 1972
- Waddell, John. Pagan Ireland: Ritual and Belief in Another World. Dublin: Wordwell Books, 2023. ISBN 978-1-9167-4202-4
- Waddell, John. The Prehistoric Archaeology of Ireland. Galway University Press, 1998. ISBN 978-1-8698-5739-4
- Zachrisson, Torun. "The Enigmatic Stone Faces: Cult Images from the Iron Age? Archived 2024-03-22 at the Wayback Machine". In Semple, Sarah; Orsini, Celia; Mui, Sian (eds). Life on the Edge: Social, Political and Religious Frontiers in Early Medieval Europe. Hanover: Hanover Museum, 2017. ISBN 978-3-9320-3077-2
