= Tandragee Idol =

Bronze Age carved stone head from Northern Ireland

The Tandragee Idol
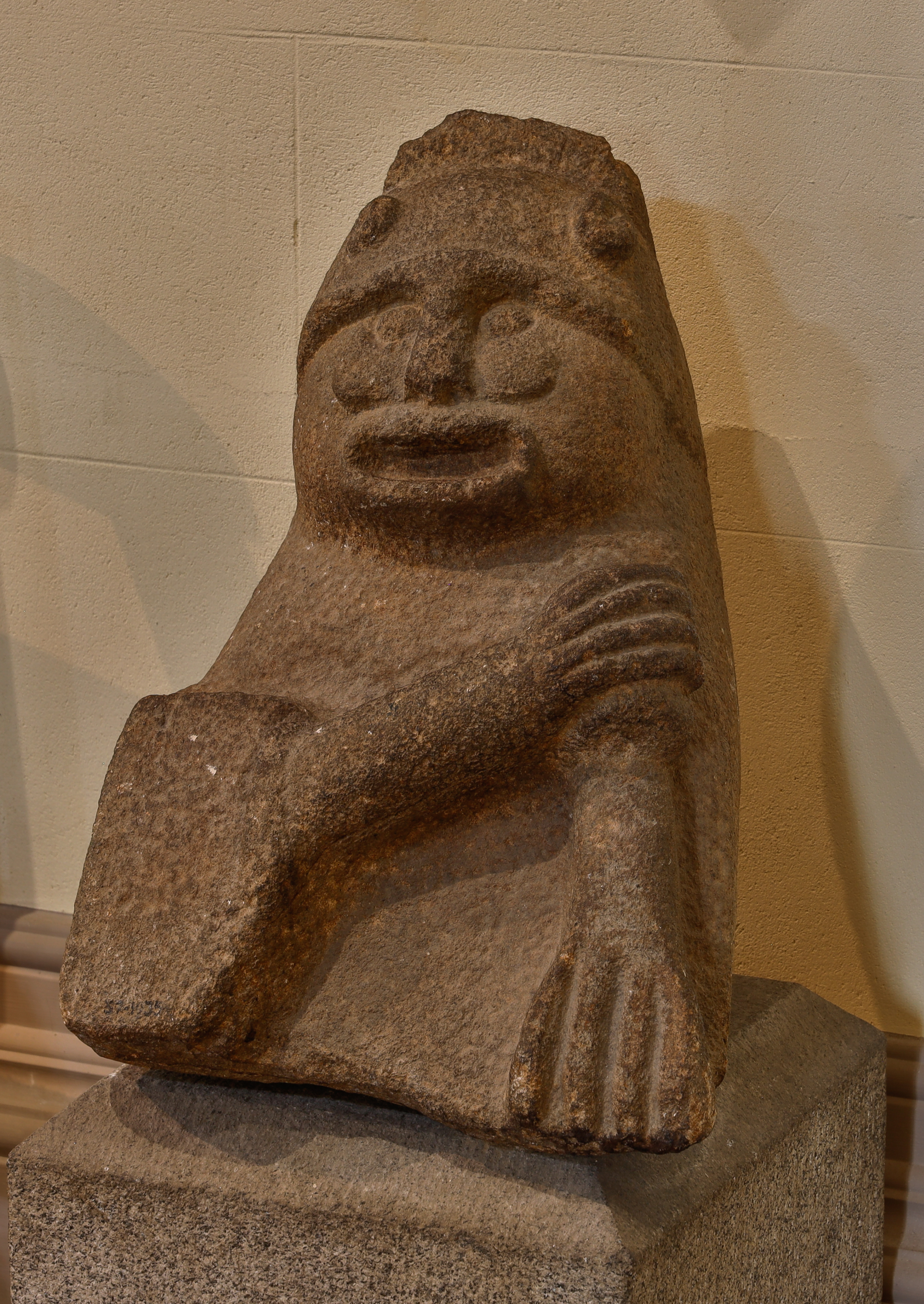
- Material: Carved granite
- Size: Height: 60 cm (24 in) Width (approx) 40 cm (16 in)
- Created: Iron Age
- Discovered: Tandragee, County Armagh, Ireland
- Present location: St Patrick's Cathedral (COI), Armagh

The Tandragee Idol is a carved granite statuette dated to the Iron Age, with some sources suggesting a date as early as 1,000 BC. It was found in the 19th century in County Armagh, Ireland. It is 60 cm (24 in) high and depicts the torso and head of a grotesque, brutish figure who crosses his body with his right arm to hold his left arm in what appears to be a ritualistic pose. The idol has a vulgar and gaping mouth, pierced nostrils and the stubs of what may be the ends of a horned helmet.

The sculpture belongs to a group of similarly ancient stone idols found on or near Cathedral Hill in Armagh. The group were likely hidden sometime after the 12th century AD to avoid plunder during the Anglo-Norman invasion of Ireland.

Based on its dating and iconography, especially the positioning of the right arm, the most probable source is the mythical Tuatha Dé Danann chieftain Nuadha of the Silver Arm. The figure's pose closely resembles the 5th century BC "Celtic Prince of Glauberg", found in Germany, and the c. 400–800 AD Janus head from Boa Island, County Fermanagh. The idol is kept in the crypt of St Patrick's Cathedral in Armagh along with other ancient stone idols from the so-called "Tandragee group" rediscovered in the mid-19th century.

== Description ==
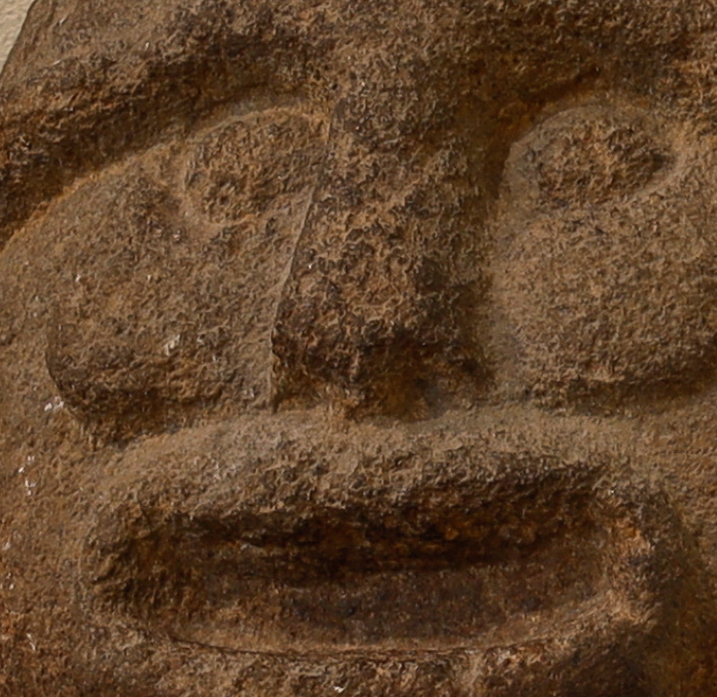
Detail of the face

The Tandragee Idol is carved from a single block of local fine-grained, pale yellow sandstone and granite. The statue shows a brutish-looking figure, whose portrayal is described by the archeologist Etienne Rynne as "magnificent in its crude barbarism", and as "menacing" by the archeologist Michael J. O'Kelly. The figure has a squat (short and wide) physique; his head is disproportionately large compared to his body and he has no real neck. According to the American archaeologist and art historian Arthur Kingsley Porter, his head "rises sharply in the back" and resembles "a veil drawn over a comb." Usually identified as male, the torso is rather sexless, but a moustache is indicated by vertical pick-marks. The figure's helmet seems to have horns, although they are now absent and indicated by two knobs (or dowels) where they would have protruded from.

His right arm seems to reach to hold his left arm. His facial features are grotesque; he has thick lips on a wide and open mouth that gapes in a vulgar manner reminiscent of the Early Medieval sheela na gig style. His nose is wide and flat, and his nostrils are pierced. His closely set oval eyes were described by the archaeologist Anne Ross as "large and coarse and placed in an unusually low position" between his large drooping lids and what appears to be a primitive, heavily ridged brow, which like his broad nose, may also be the outline of a helmet. Both hands have four crudely drawn and oversized fingers, and lack both thumbs and knuckles.

== Modern provenance ==
The Tandragee Idol’s modern provenance is uncertain. It was discovered between 1834 and 1840, when St Patrick's Cathedral, Armagh. was undergoing extensive renovation. According to the archeologist Richard Warner, a relatively significant number of carvings, tomb stones and architectural fragments were found hidden during the renovation, some of which may have been acquired by the English architect Lewis Nockalls Cottingham, while others were acquired by local antiquarians. The statue was in a rockery at the rectory of Ballymore Parish Church in Tandragee until 1932, "with some other unspecified sculptural fragments said to have come from Armagh".

The idol was first described in 1934 by Porter. He had viewed it two years earlier when it was in the possession of the widow of John McEndoo, rector of the Anglican church of St Mark in Tandragee. She did not know where exactly her husband had acquired the idol, but had the impression (since disproved) that it had been found in a peat bog in County Armagh sometime in the 19th century. Following her death in 1935, the statue was donated to the Ulster Museum in Belfast by the rector, Canon Percy Marks.

In the early 1940s, the curator of the Armagh County Museum, with the help and financial backing of Archbishop John Gregg, acquired many of the locally held stone heads and artefacts for the cathedral. The effort was based on the priest and theologian John Paterson's belief that it was their original find spot. Today the Tandragee Idol is kept in the cathedral's crypt.

A cast is in the Ulster Museum.

== Dating ==
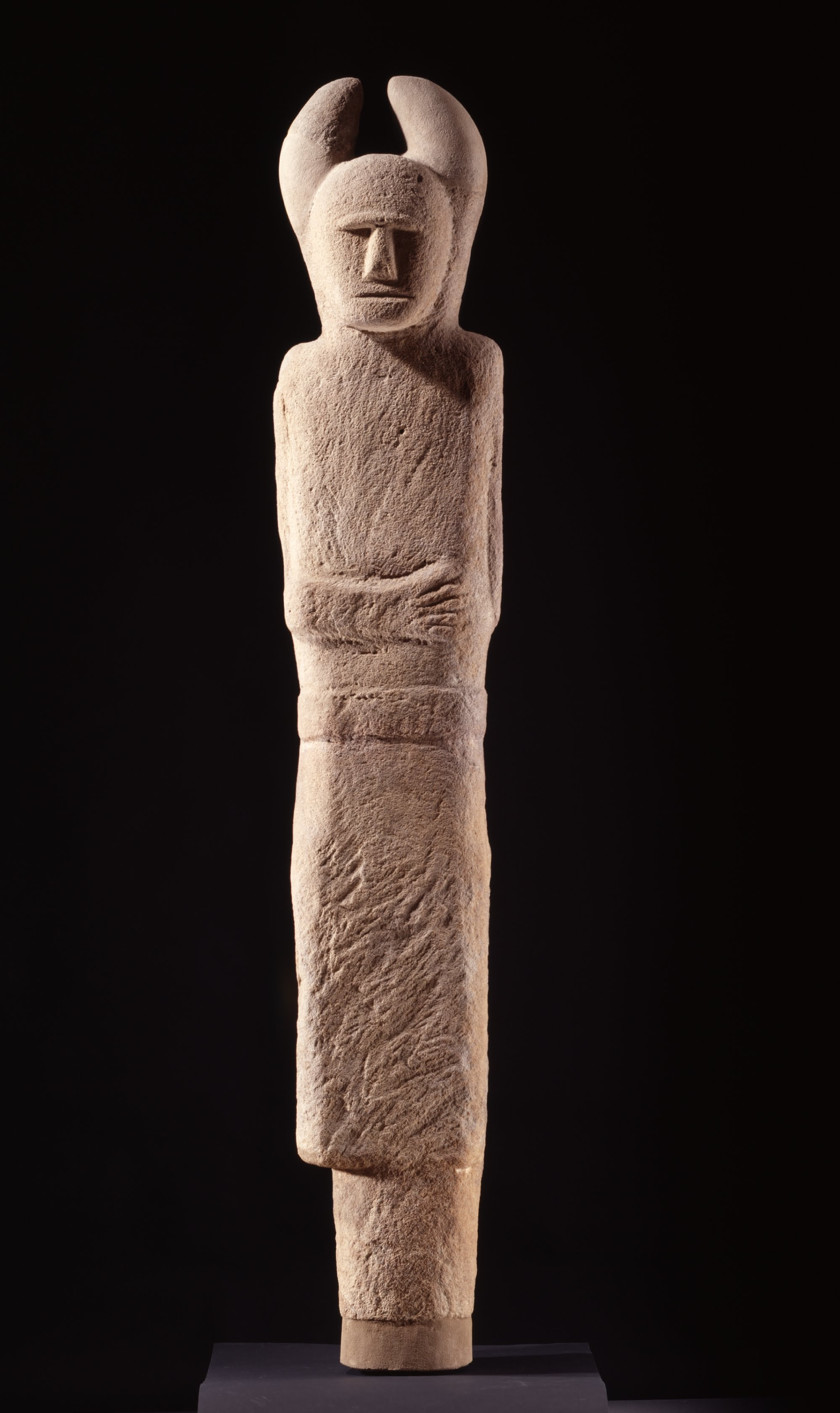
The Holzgerlingen figure, 5th or 4th century BC

It is unclear when the Tandragee Idol was carved, but it is generally dated to the 1st century BC, that is during the Iron Age. The archaeologist Etienne Rynne says most surviving prehistoric Irish stone heads are of pagan Celtic origin, and date from the first to the fifth century AD. Most originate from the province of Ulster.

The idol is thought to have originated from Cathedral Hill, Armagh, one of a group of six similarly dated Iron Age stone sculptures that Rynne said were "clearly carved in one school, perhaps even by the one hand", and is "the only really closely-knit group [of prehistoric stone idols] in Ireland. Cathedral Hill (also known as the Hill of Armagh (Irish: Ard Mhacha or The Height of the Plain)) was an important pagan Celtic cult centre during the early centuries AD, succeeding nearby Navan Fort (Irish: Eamhain Mhacha). The enclosure (or ditch) around the hill is thought to be later: radiocarbon dating gives a terminal date range of c. 30 BC to 390 AD.

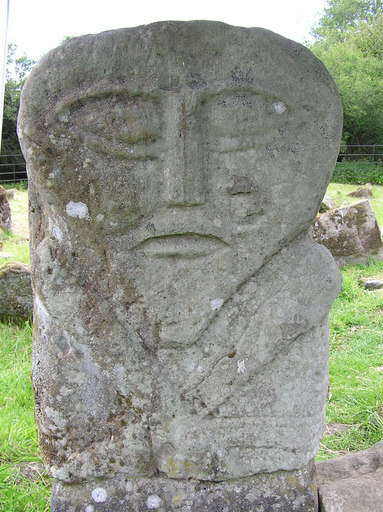
The c. 400 – c. 800 AD The Janus figure, Boa Island

Stone artefacts cannot be dated without context. Many Irish stone idols considered ancient were found hidden on ruined church grounds; some were built on much older pagan sites, and none have been found in their original or ancient contexts. Therefore, archaeologists often rely on art-historical dating methods, such as tracing their methodological or iconographical origins.

In 1934 Porter dismissed the idea that the Tandragee idol might be a modern hoax, writing: "One feels at once in the sculpture a vigour, an imaginative power, which puts the possibility of a hoax out of the question. We are in the presence of a genuine and very gripping work of art."

== Function and iconography ==
As with the 1st century AD Corleck Head, the Tandragee Idol was likely produced for a pagan shrine or worship site. The "Tandrage group" of stone heads also includes a figure in the same pose as the Tandragee Idol, a figure with a similar face as the Tandragee Idol but with a dog or wolf coming out of its back, a "Sun God" figure akin to Sol Invictus, a bearded head, and three individual dogs or bears.

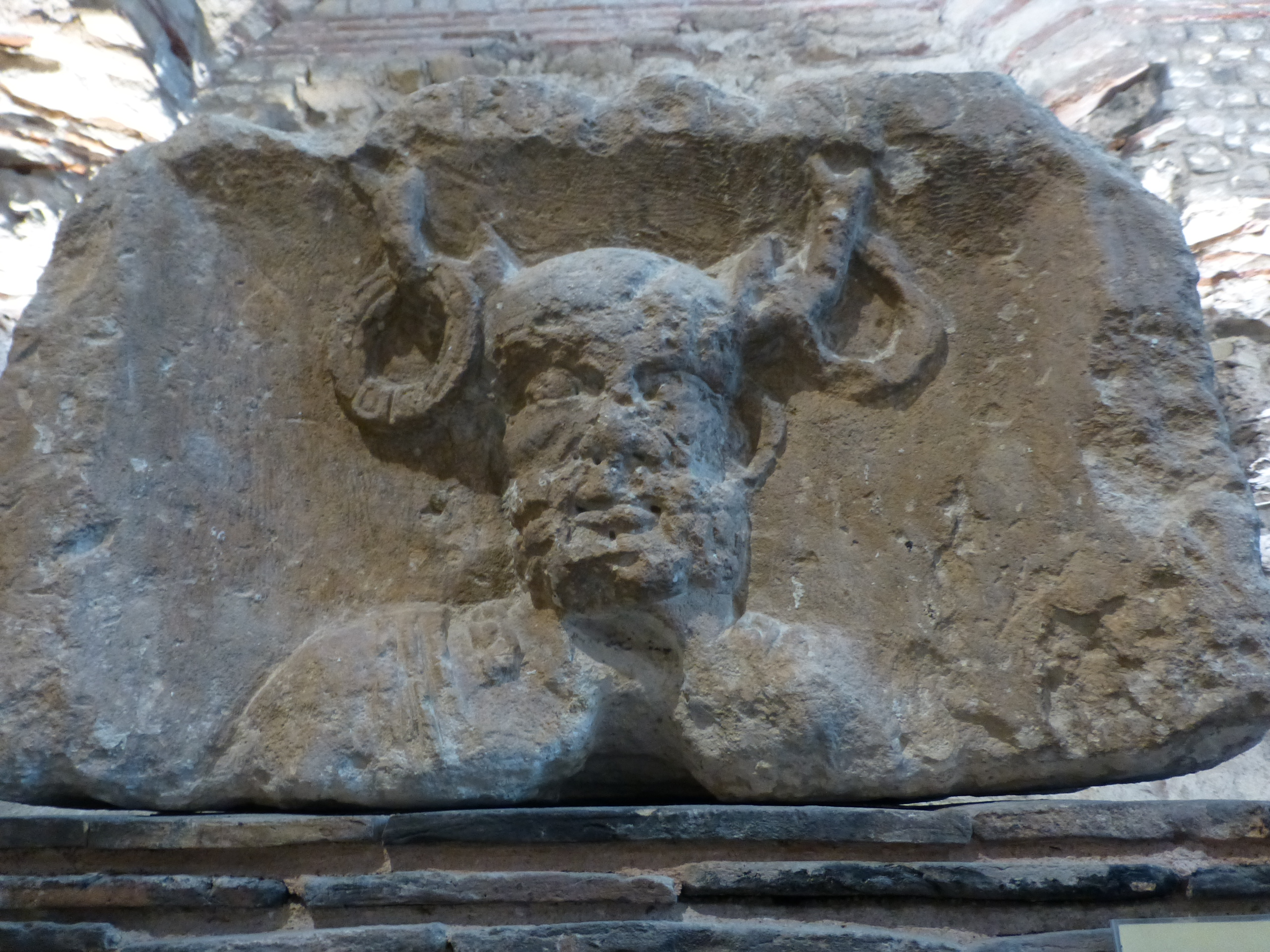
Stone capital on the 1st century AD Pillar of the Boatmen, showing the head of the god Cernunnos. Musée national du Moyen Âge, Paris

Porter believed the horns on the Tandragee Idol were the key to understanding its origin and meaning. He likened it to the 1st century AD low relief head of the ancient Celtic god Cernunnos on the Pillar of the Boatmen, in the Musée national du Moyen Âge in Paris. Although Cernunnos was venerated mostly in the north-eastern region of Gaul (roughly present-day France, Belgium and Luxembourg) and does not appear in Irish literary sources, Porter speculated that because horned gods are extremely rare in early Celtic iconography, the Tandragee Idol may show influence from Gaulish sculpture and tradition. Porter goes on to observe that other horned figures appear in Irish mythology, including in the story of Conall Cernach, the foster brother of the Ulster warrior and demigod Cú Chulainn.

Art historians and folklorists such as Helen Lanigan Wood and Ellen Etlinger have associated the idol with Nuadha of the Silver Arm, the mythical chieftain of the Tuatha Dé Danann. According to legend, Nuadha lost an arm in battle, which was replaced with a silver prosthetic, hence the link to the Tandragee figure, which seemingly clings to its left arm. According to Lanigan Wood, the sculpture shows Nuada formally dressed in a horned helmet, proudly displaying his newly restored arm.

The archaeologist Patrick Gleeson cautioned against viewing such Celtic Early Iron Age artefacts through a pan-Celtic lens. He noted how "deities are often plucked from later texts to explain the function and symbolism of items like the Corleck Head or Tandragee Idol, much as ethnic labels have been used to explain material phenomena regarded as Romano-British". Mark Williams gives a date of c. 1000 BC and argues that the link with Nuadha is "at best only a possibility", given the legend of Nuadha's silver arm does not appear in records until much later. Writing in 1997, the Irish archeologist Fergus O'Farrell concluded that "the common pose of these figures must have had some significance not yet recognised or understood."

The Tandragee Idol has been compared to the c. 400–800 AD double-headed stone figure in the cemetery on Boa Island, County Fermanagh, as well as a stone idol found in Böblingen, Baden-Württemberg, Germany, and a life-sized La Tène figure found in 1996 at the Glauberg hillfort in Hesse, Germany. Each shows a figure holding a seemingly detached arm with their other arm, all with the holding arm at a similar upward angle, though the positions of the arms differ, from the left holding the right arm to the right holding the left arm.

== Sources ==
- Gleeson, Patrick. "Reframing the first millennium AD in Ireland: archaeology, history, landscape." Proceedings of the Royal Irish Academy, volume 122C, August 2022
- Kelly, Eamonn P. "Late Bronze Age and Iron Age Antiquities". In: Ryan, Michael (ed), Treasures of Ireland: Irish Art 3000 BC – 1500 AD. Dublin: Royal Irish Academy, 1983. ISBN 978-0-9017-1428-2
- Lanigan Wood, Helen. "Dogs and Celtic Deities: Pre-Christian Stone Carvings in Armagh". Irish Arts Review Yearbook, volume 16, 2000. JSTOR 20493105
- O'Farrell, Fergus. "Celtic Headcases". Archaeology Ireland, volume 11, number 1, Spring 1997. JSTOR 20562323
- Ó hÓgáin, Dáithí. Myth, Legend & Romance: An encyclopaedia of the Irish folk tradition. Prentice Hall Press, 1991. ISBN 978-0-1327-5959-5
- O'Kelly, Michael. Early Ireland: An Introduction to Irish Prehistory. Cambridge University Press, 1989. ISBN 978-0-5213-3489-1
- Paterson, John Thomas Farquhar, O. Davies. "The head of Saint Patrick at Armagh". Ulster Journal of Archaeology, series 3, volume 3, 1940
- Porter, Arthur. "A Sculpture at Tandragee". The Burlington Magazine for Connoisseurs, volume 65, number 380, 1934. JSTOR 865867
- Raftery, Barry. Pagan Celtic Ireland: The Enigma of the Irish Iron Age. London: Thames & Hudson, 1994. ISBN 978-0-5002-7983-0
- Ross, Anne. "The Human Head in Insular Pagan Celtic Religion". Proceedings of the Society of Antiquaries of Scotland, volume 91, 1960
- Rynne, Etienne. "Celtic Stone Idols in Ireland". In: Thomas, Charles. The Iron Age in the Irish Sea province Archived 2 February 2023 at the Wayback Machine. London: Council for British Archaeology, 1972
- Rynne, Etienne. "The Three Stone Heads at Woodlands, near Raphoe, Co. Donegal". The Journal of the Royal Society of Antiquaries of Ireland, vol. 94, no. 2, 1964. JSTOR 25509564
- Waddell, John. Pagan Ireland: Ritual and Belief in Another World. Dublin: Wordwell Books, 2023. ISBN 978-1-9167-4202-4
- Waddell, John. The Prehistoric Archaeology of Ireland Archived 31 July 2023 at the Wayback Machine. Galway University Press, 1998. ISBN 978-191-3934-781
- Warner, Richard. "The Armagh 'Pagan' Statues: A Summary of their Known History & Possible Evidence of their Original Location". Ulster Journal of Archaeology, third series, volume 72, 2013. JSTOR 44135437
- Warner, Richard. "Two pagan idols – remarkable new discoveries Archived 29 October 2023 at the Wayback Machine". Archaeology Ireland, volume 17, number 1, 2003. ISSN 0790-892X
- Welsh, Harry. The Prehistoric Artefacts of Northern Ireland. Archaeopress Publishing, 2022. ISBN 978-1-7896-9953-1
- Williams, Mark. Ireland's immortals: a history of the gods of Irish myth. Oxford: Princeton University Press, 2016. ISBN 978-0-691-18304-6
