= Boa Island figures =

Stone idols in Northern Ireland

Coordinates: 54°31′N 7°50′W

The Boa Island figures
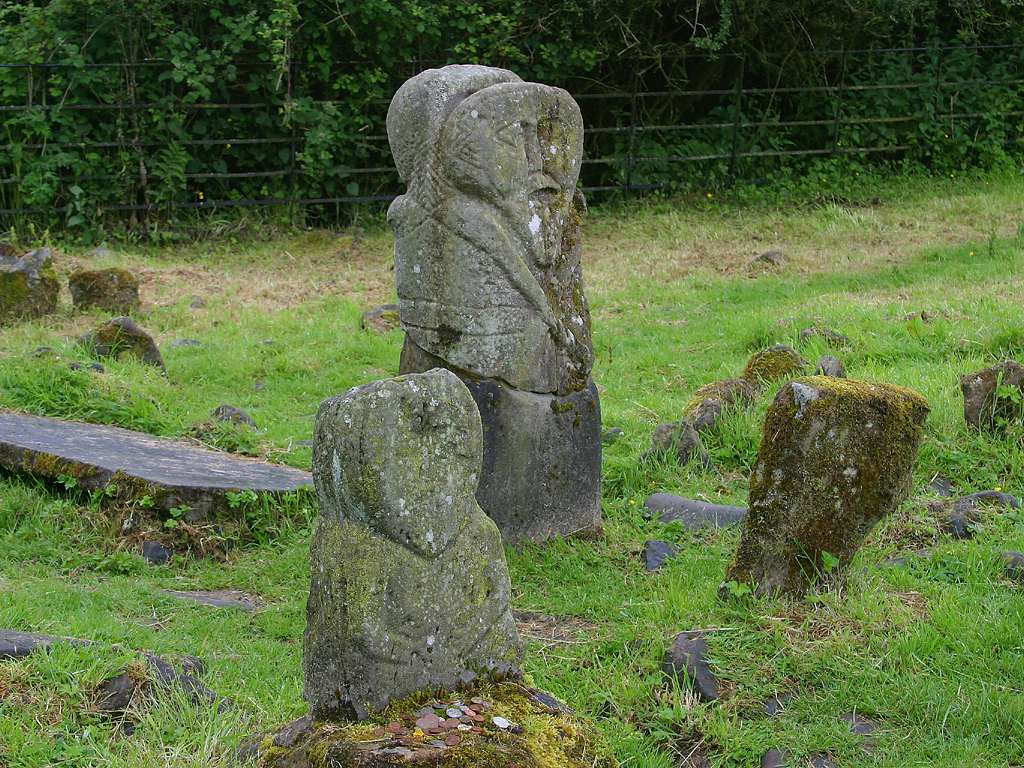
- The Boa Island figures, Caldragh graveyard
- Material: Stone
- Size: Janus: height 73 cm (29 in), width: 45 cm (18 in)
- Created: Iron Age, 1st century AD
- Discovered: Boa Island

The Boa Island figures are two stone idols in the Caldragh graveyard on Boa Island, located near the north shore of Lower Lough Erne in County Fermanagh, Northern Ireland. They are assumed to date from the Irish Iron Age period and consist of two anthropomorphic carved stone statues known as the Lustymore and Dreenan figures.

They are today placed beside each other in Caldragh graveyard, which itself dates from the early Irish Christian period (400–800 AD). Although both figures are badly damaged from wear, the Dreenan figure is in especially poor condition. Both figures are generally accepted to be the likeness of pagan deities, although which ones has not been established.

The Nobel Prize winning poet Seamus Heaney celebrated the enigmatic Boa Island bilateral figure's similarity to the Roman deity Janus in his poem "January God". The Enniskillen-born poet Francis Harvey published a collection of poems called The Boa Island Janus in 1996.

== Caldragh graveyard ==
The sculptures are today in Caldragh graveyard, an ancient Christian burial ground on the southern end of Boa Island, which is itself on the south coast of Lough Erne, County Fermanagh. Although the early history of the graveyard is unknown, archaeologists believe the burial site was once much larger, given that some of the surrounding fields contain ancient stones that probably marked a larger boundary.

The modern graveyard is enclosed by an iron railing and until the late 20th century was overgrown with grass and weeds. It contains some relatively recent gravestones, including unmarked graves for unbaptized children.

== Boa Island Janus ==
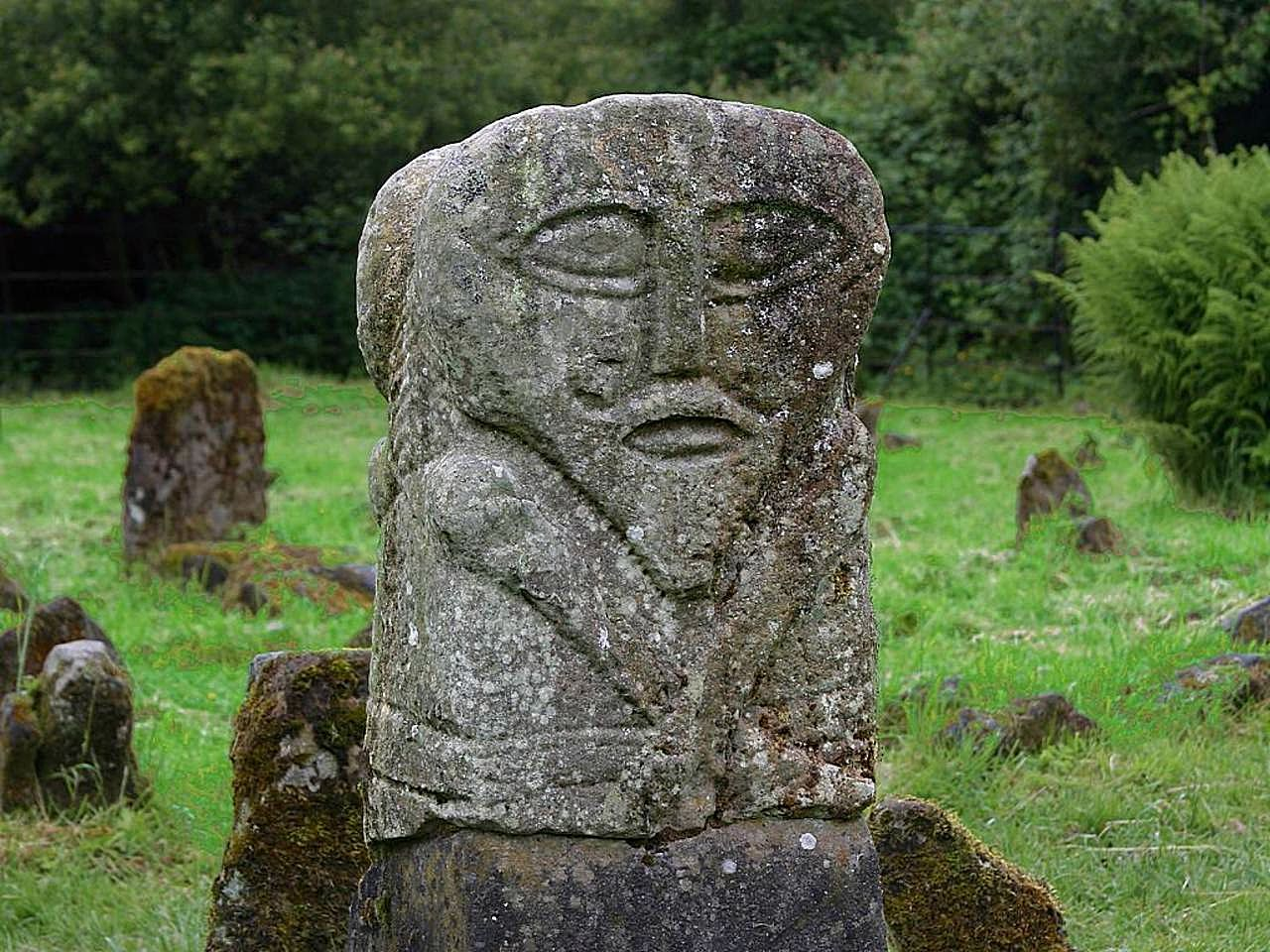
Photo of one side of the Janus figure

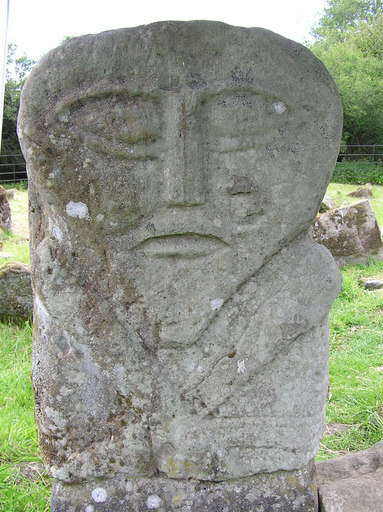
Opposite side

The Boa Island Janus (two-headed) sculpture is the largest of the two and regarded as one of Ireland's most enigmatic prehistoric stone figures. It is thought to represent a Celtic deity and could represent a Celtic goddess as readily as a god, especially given the name of the island. In Celtic mythology, heads were given great importance as they were thought to contain a person's spirit, and severed heads were sometimes taken in triumph after battles.

The statue is 73 cm (29 in) high and 45 cm (18 in) wide. Each side consists of a face and torso, and seem to depict the same individual. On the sides of the stone where the two carved figures are joined, there is an interlacing design that may represent hair. The faces are large and oval, with big eyes, straight noses, and half-open mouths with protruding tongues above pointed chins. The figure lacks a neck: the head rests directly on the torso. The torso itself is formed from a square block and shows hunched shoulders, crossed arms and a belt, and ends just below the waist. The lower section of the figure shows two crossed hands with elongated fingers carved in relief, but on one side the lower portion of the hands has broken off. However, this detached segment was rediscovered in the early 2000's half-buried in the ground close to the statue.

== Lustyman figure ==
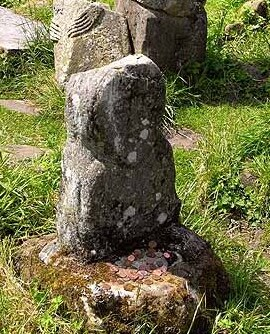
The much degraded Lustyman figure

The much smaller and very worn Lustyman figure stands with its back to the Janus figure. Its face lacks the detail of the Janus figure and it is overall less visually impressive. It is, however, thought to be older than the Lustyman idol, which is less worn.

== Origin and dating ==
It is unknown why and when the sculptures were made. They most likely formed a role in Iron Age pagan worship sites.

The Janus figure is often compared to the two-faced Holzgerlingen figure found in Germany and the Tandragee Idol now in St. Patrick's Cathedral, Armagh. These comparisons suggest that the figure dates to the Iron Age. However early Christian sites around Lough Erne are rich in these types of figures. An example is the White Island collection of figures found 3 miles (4.8 km) south-east of Boa Island, which are primitive looking but date from the early Christian period.

== Sources ==
- Eogan, George; Herity, Michael. Ireland in Prehistory. London: Routledge, 2013. ISBN 978-1-3158-8762-3
- Lowry-Corry, Dorothy. "The Stones Carved with Human Effigies on Boa Island and on Lustymore Island, in Lower Lough Erne". Proceedings of the Royal Irish Academy: Archaeology, Culture, History, Literature, volume 41, 1932. JSTOR 25515968
- Halpin, Andy; Newman, Conor. Ireland: An Oxford Archaeological Guide to Sites from Earliest Times to AD 1600. Oxford: Oxford University Press, 2006. ISBN 0-1928-8057-8
- Ó Hogain, Dáithí. "Patronage & Devotion in Ancient Irish Religion". History Ireland, volume 8, no. 4, winter 2000. JSTOR 27724824
- O'Kelly, Michael. Early Ireland: An Introduction to Irish Prehistory. Cambridge: Cambridge University Press, 1989. ISBN 0-5213-3687-2
- Rynne, Etienn. "Celtic Stone Idols in Ireland". In: Thomas, Charles. The Iron Age in the Irish Sea province: papers given at a C.B.A. conference held at Cardiff, January 3 to 5, 1969. London: Council for British Archaeology, 1972
- Waddell, John. The Prehistoric Archaeology of Ireland. Galway: Galway University Press, 1998. ISBN 1-8698-5739-9
- Warner, Richard. "Two pagan idols – remarkable new discoveries". Archaeology Ireland, volume 17, no. 1, 2003. ISSN 0790-892X
