= Bon Marché head =

Sculpture found in England in 1934

External images
- The Bon Marché head at Getty Images.
- The Bon Marché head at Alamy Images.

The Bon Marché head or Gloucester stone head is a limestone sculpture of a human head unearthed during construction on the Bon Marché building in Gloucester, England. The head is now at the Museum of Gloucester.

Though certainly Celtic in design, the dating of the stone head is subject to some controversy. It has been dated to the 1st century AD by those who classify the head as Romano-Celtic (and in particular, influenced by Julio-Claudian sculpture) but has since been assigned a Norman date by Kevin Greene, who classifies the head as a work of Romanesque art.

== Discovery ==
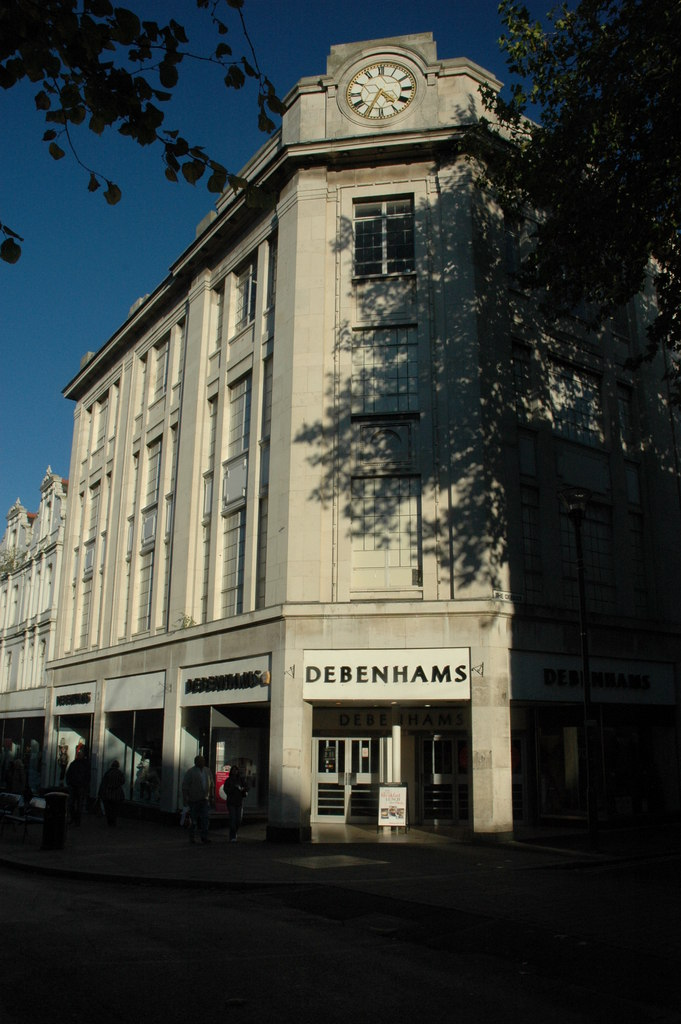
The Bon Marché building (in this photo a Debenham's, now a University of Gloucestershire building) on Northgate Street, Gloucester.

The stone head was found in 1934 while an extension to the Bon Marché building on Northgate Street, Gloucester was being constructed. The head was found six feet deep, among Roman and medieval pottery, whitewashed Roman sculpture, and human remains dated to Roman times. The excavators described it as a "fine Roman head". The findspot was within the site of Glevum, the Roman fort upon which Gloucester was founded. However, a medieval church (demolished in the 17th century) called St. Aldate's also once stood on the Bon Marché site.

The stone head is now in the collection of the Museum of Gloucester.

== Description ==
The head is carved from local oolitic limstone. It measures 21 cm from the chin to the top of its head. The stone is remarkably unweathered and has only a few fractures. A reddish colouration is visible on the face. Some scholars (such as Celticist Anne Ross) have suggested this is the residue of red paint. Much Roman sculpture was once painted. However this colouration is not in the crevices (where paint residue commonly survives on Roman sculpture) but on the forehead and forelocks. This has led Greene to suggest that this colouration is merely a result of a vein of reddish rock in the limestone, or perhaps exposure to fire.

The rear surface is flat, which has led most scholars to conclude that the head originally served an architectural purpose. The top of the head is uncarved, so it was probably intended to be viewed from below. Diagonal markings along the rear surface are probably suggestive of its method of removal from the building. Vincent Megaw (who favours a 1st-century date) has conjectured that the stone head formed the crowning feature of a pillar monument. Greene has suggested it was a decorative corbel. This reflects his preferred dating as corbels in Roman architecture are never figurative.

The head is narrow and tapering. The face is male and clean-shaven. The eyes are large, bulging, and lentoid. The ears are prominent and stylised. The mouth is small, thin-lipped, and slightly downcurved. The nose is sharp and wedge-shaped. The hair is carved as individual locks; they hang over the figure's forehead and are each incised with regular grooves. The haircut has been described by Greene as a "basin cut", with neither sideburns nor hair down its nape.

== Dating ==
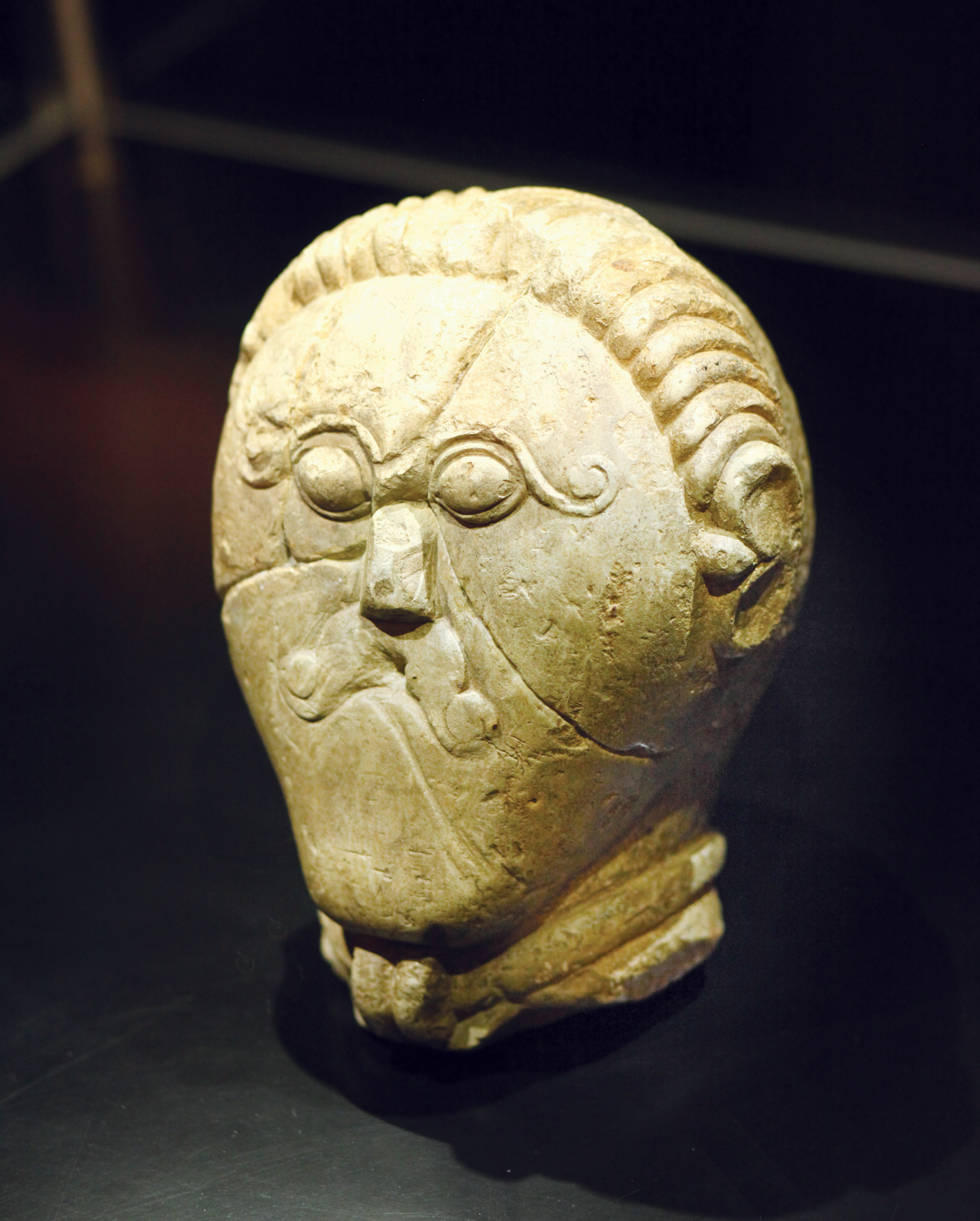
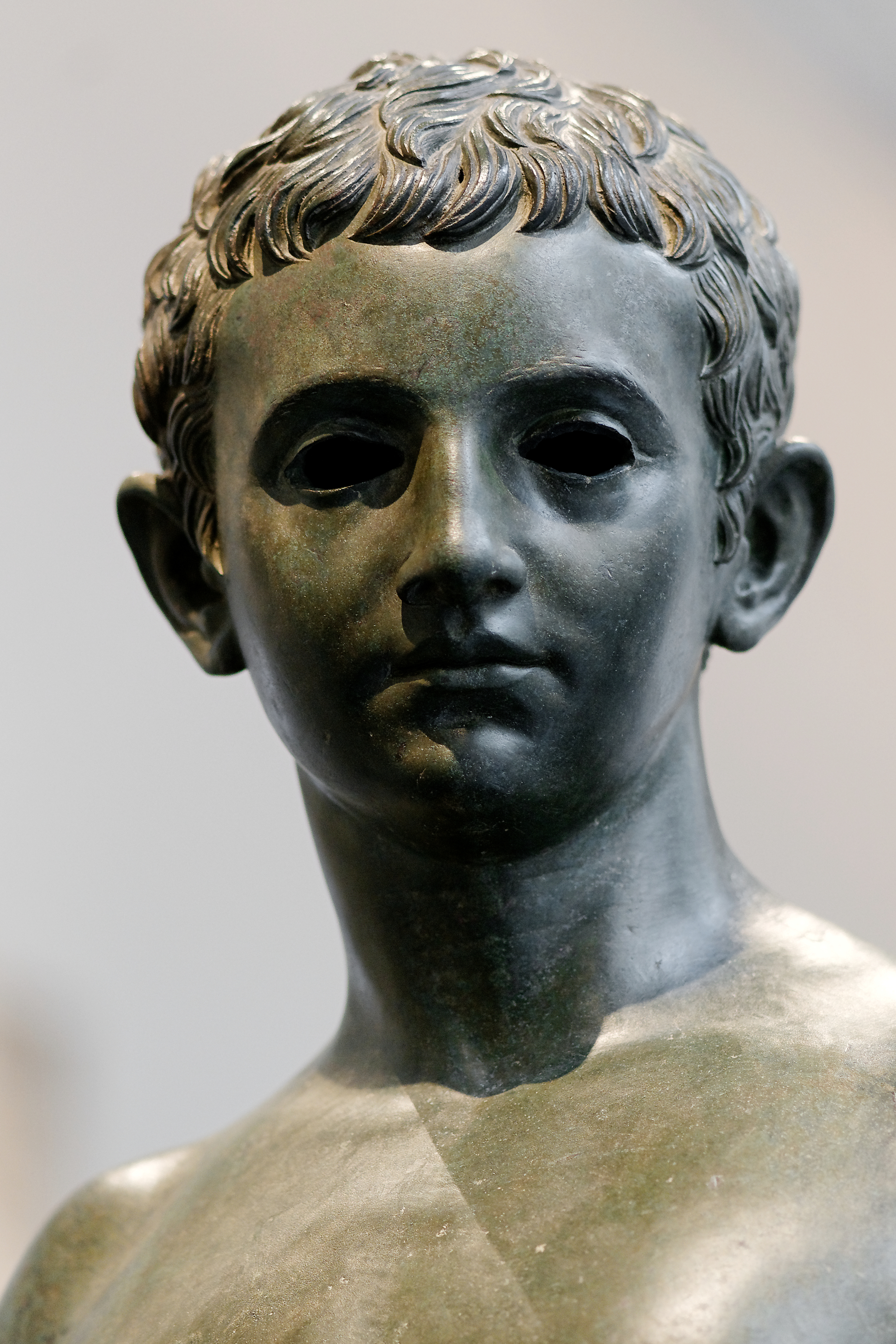
The eyes and mouth of the Bon Marché head have been compared with those on Celtic sculptures, such as the Mšecké Žehrovice Head (left), while the locks have been compared with those on Julio-Claudian sculpture (example right).

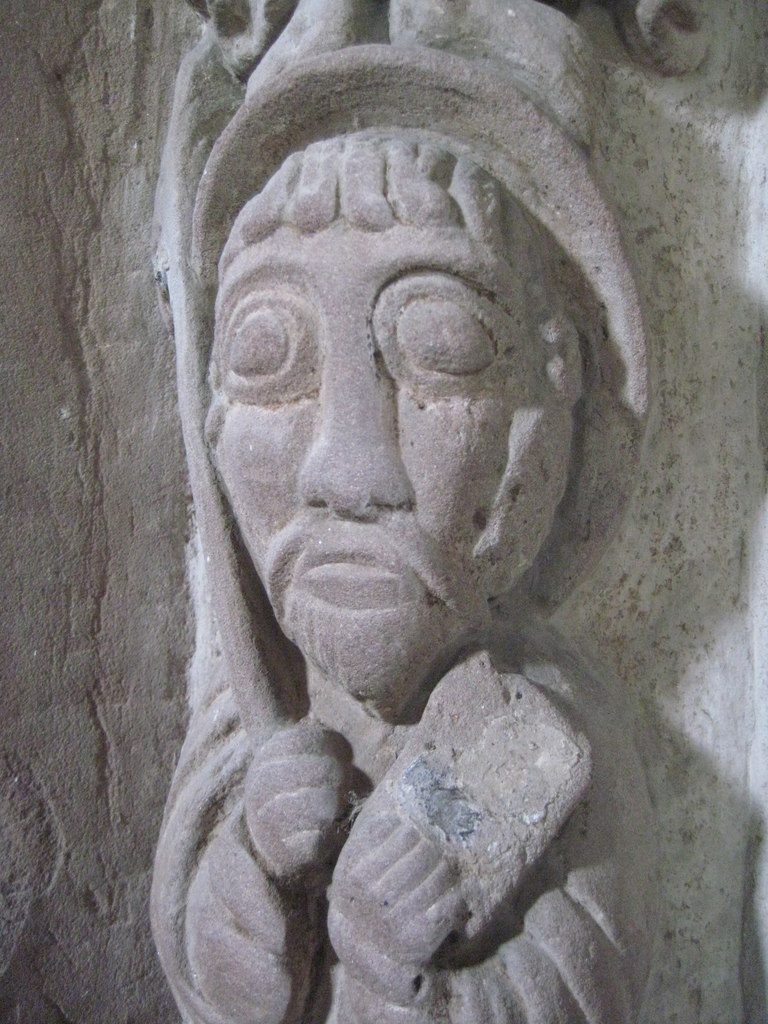
On the other hand, the Bon Marché head has been compared with such Herefordshire School sculptures as this of St Peter in the Church of St Mary and St David, Kilpeck.

The Celtic influence on the stone head has been described as "indisputable" by Greene. The lentoid eyes and small mouth have been singled out as particularly Celtic in influence; so has the expression, which Jocelyn Toynbee has described as "aloof, almost wrapt". Megaw has compared the stylised ears of the Gloucester head and those of the Iron Age Celtic Mšecké Žehrovice Head.

However, Celtic elements cast a long shadow in European art history. Such features are compatible with both the Roman date and the Norman date. The 1st century date (early in the Roman occupation of Britain) therefore depends on the supposed Julio-Claudian influence on the head. Megaw and Toynbee see this influence in the "general build of the skull and structure of the brow" (Toynbee's phrase) as well as the rendering of the hair. In Julio-Claudian sculpture, the hair is carved as individual curling locks, each lock incised with parallel ridges.

Considered as an example of Romano-Celtic art, it has been widely appreciated. Ross has said that, among Romano-British sculpted heads, it is "the most impressive [...] from an artistic standpoint". Megaw complimented the "tenacity" of "Celtic creative expression", which managed not to be submerged under Roman stylistic influence. Toynbee has written of the head that it is:

A remarkable example of a genuinely Romano-British product in which the principles of three-dimensional classical carving and features that can be recognised at once as Celtic are harmoniously and most effectively combined [...] indeed, it might be said that without the stimulus of classical portrait-sculpture the piece could never have been conceived.

Kevin Greene is sceptical of Julio-Claudian influence on the hair. Irregular locks and sideburns characterise Julio-Claudian hair, whereas the Gloucester head has regular locks and a bowl cut. He also questions what a piece of Celtic-inspired sculpture was doing on a building in the new and primarily military Roman fort of Glevum. Greene cites the Winchester Cathedral Tournai font and the sculpture of St Peter at Kilpeck Church as figures in British Romanesque art which exhibit similar facial structures and have bowl cuts with individual locks. Martin Henig has concurred with Greene, further citing the figures on the south portal of Kilpeck and the St Giles Hospital, Hereford tympanum. Greene intends a Norman date for the head. The St Giles Hospital tympanum and the sculptures at Kilpeck are all works of the Romanesque Herefordshire School, which flourished in the 12th century and perhaps had a direct influence in Gloucester. On this basis, Ewa Chwojko and Malcolm Thurlby suggest that if the stone is Romanesque, it would date to the 12th century.

Chwojko and Thurlby decline to decide between the two dates to which the stone head has been assigned, but note that among works of the Herefordshire School, "the modelling is more plastic, especially for the cheekbones" (though exceptions to this rule are found at Kilpeck). Chwojko and Thurlby do note that the difficulty of dating this stone shows the strong influence of regional Roman sculpture on British Romanesque art.

== See also ==
- Celtic stone idols
- Hohensalzburg head
