= Hohensalzburg head =

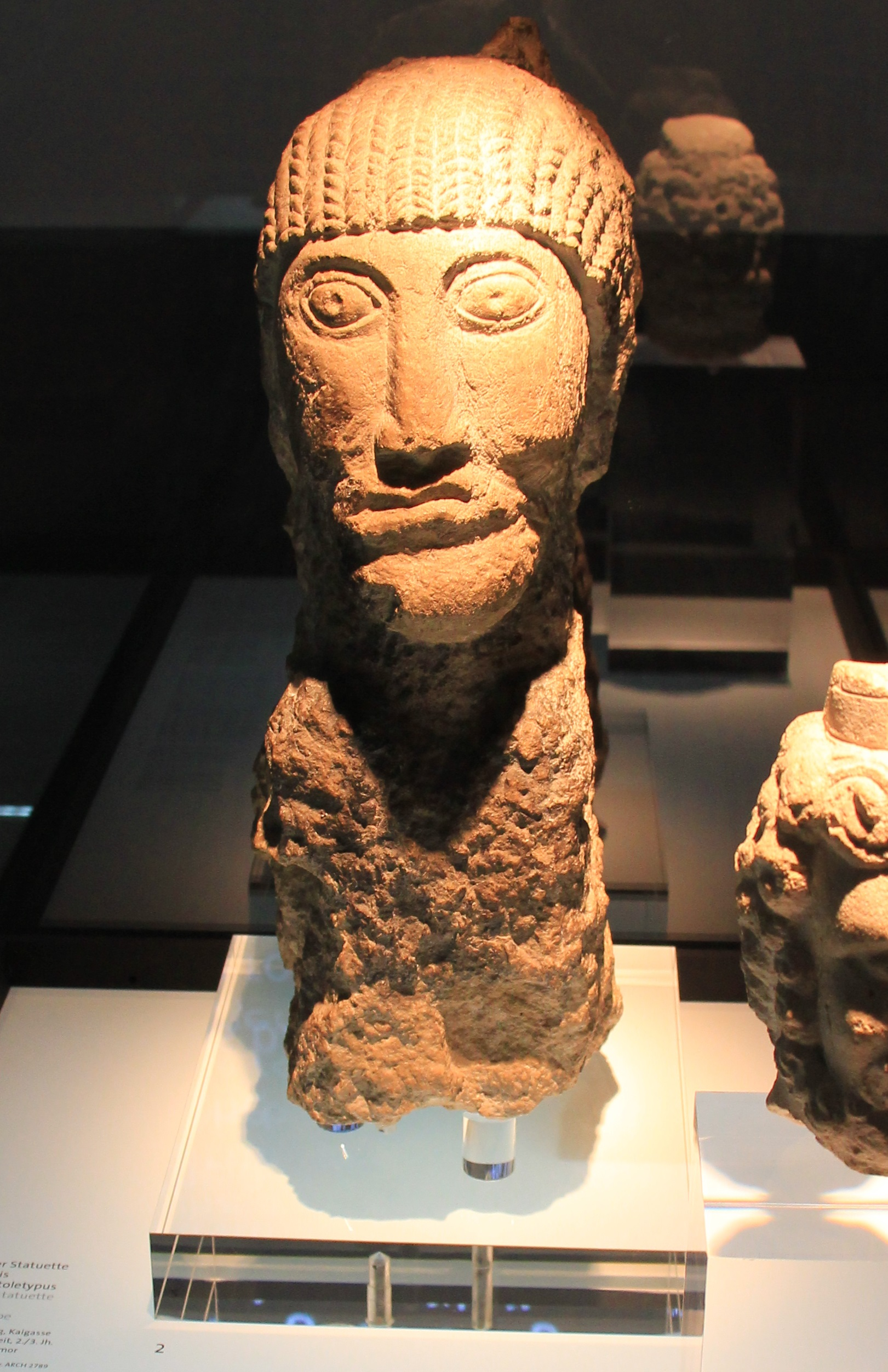
The Hohensalzburg head on display at Salzburg Museum.

The Hohensalzburg head is a Celtic marble head which was spolia in Hohensalzburg Fortress, Salzburg in Austria until 1956. The head is tentatively dated to the 1st century AD.

== Discovery ==
The head was first known as spolia, built into the wall above the Rosspforte (lit., "horse gate") of Hohensalzburg Fortress. It was known here as the Romerkopf (lit., "Roman head"). It was removed in 1956 during repairs and put on display in another room of the castle. The head is currently in the collection of Salzburg Museum.

== Description ==
The head is carved from local Untersberg marble. The total height of the block is around 50 centimetres (20 in) and the height of the head is 17 centimetres (6.7 in). The pedestal-like lower part of the stone suggests that this head once surmounted a herm or pillar.

The head is male and life-sized. The cheeks are hollow. The nose, which comes down from the brows, is wedge-shaped except for two flared nostrils. The chin is rounded and broad. The eyes are protruding and oval, with pupils indented. The mouth is peculiarly twisted, like a circumflex. In place of hair, crowning the head, are deep, vertical ridges in a wave-like pattern.

== Interpretation ==
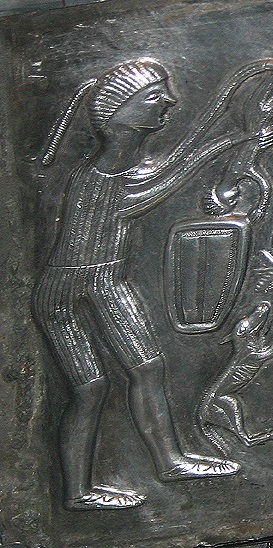
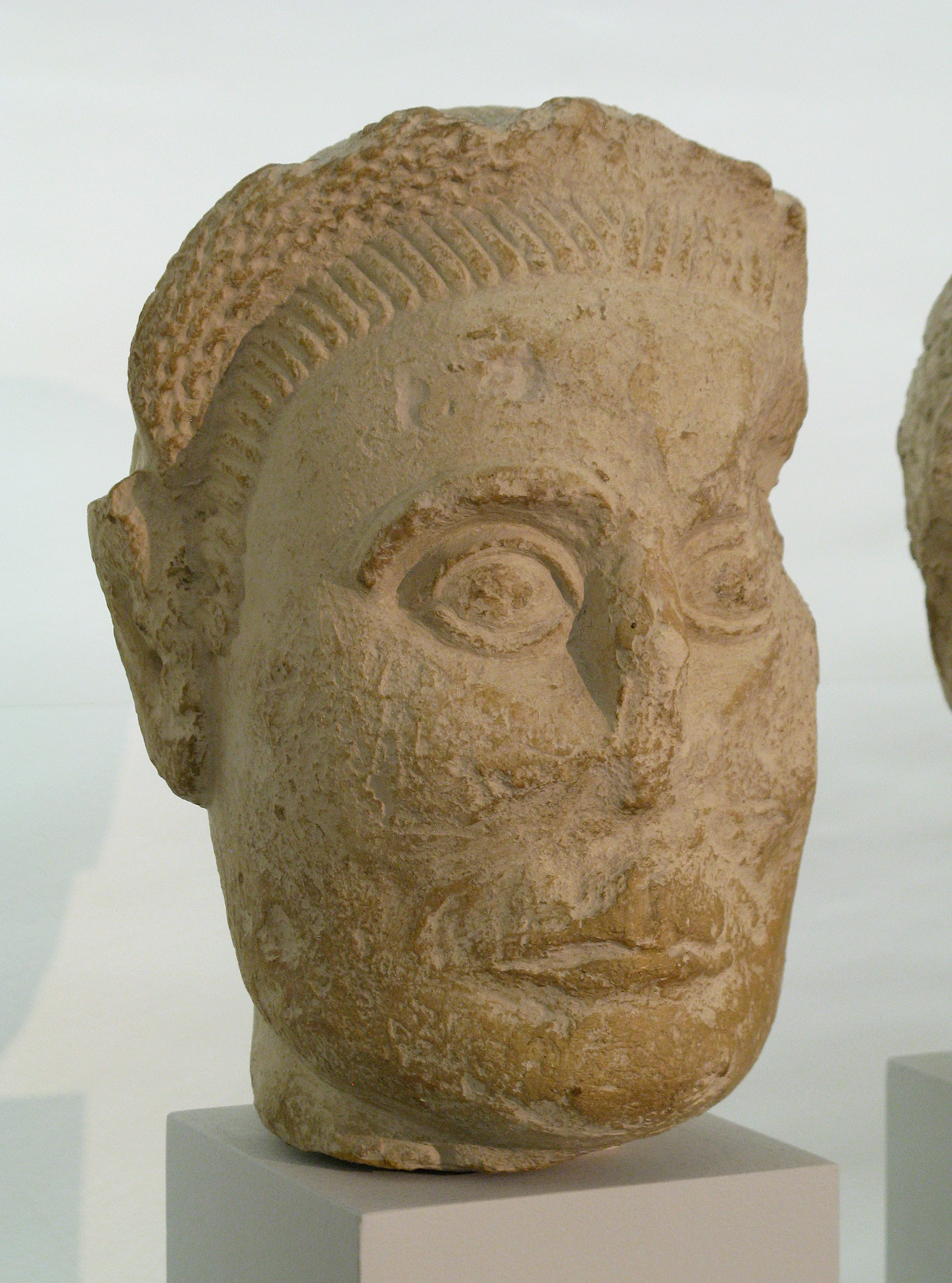
The wave-like markings on the Hohensalzburg head have been compared with the cap of a figure from Gundestrup cauldron (left) and a stone head from Entremont (right).

Several features identify this head as Celtic: the oval eyes, wedge nose, and hollow cheeks. In the circumflex mouth and almost flat chin, the Hohensalzburg head can be compared to the Janus head from Roquepertuse. The wave-like pattern on the head has been interpreted by T. G. E. Powell as hair, and likened to the much more detailed pattern on one head from Entremont. Kurt Willvonseder interprets this pattern as a knit cap and compares it to a figure on the Gundestrup cauldron.

One question with regards to the Hohensalzburg head is its relationship to the 16 BC Roman occupation of Austria (called Noricum by the Romans). Celtic art survived this occupation, so no stylistic features exclude a date after its commencement. Willvonseder suggests that the dot-like pupils were not a feature of Celtic art before the Roman occupation; however Vincent Megaw has pointed out these are in fact a very archaic feature, featuring on such early La Tène artefacts as the Dürrnberg beaked jug. The analogues to the wave-like hair pattern, the head from Entremont and the Gundestrup cauldron, both predate this occupation. However, Celtic art this early rarely renders the nose with such detail. Willvonseder favours a date after 16 BC, and Megaw conjecturally dates the stone to the 1st century AD.

== See also ==
- Celtic stone idols
- Bon Marché head
- Mšecké Žehrovice Head
