= Boa Island =

Island in County Fermanagh, Northern Ireland

Coordinates: 54°31′N 7°50′W

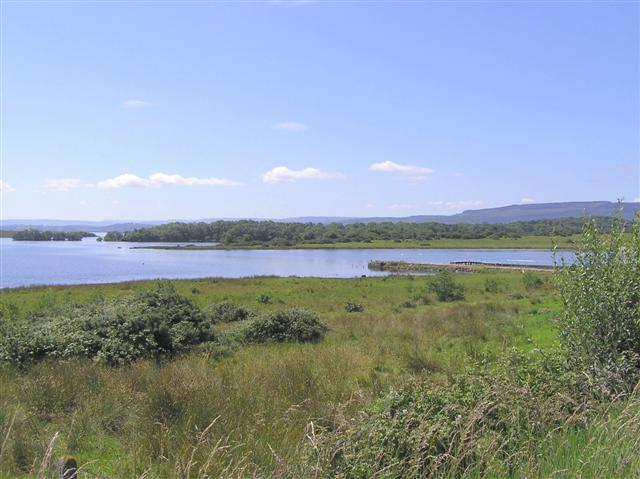
Boa Island, overlooking Lower Lough Erne

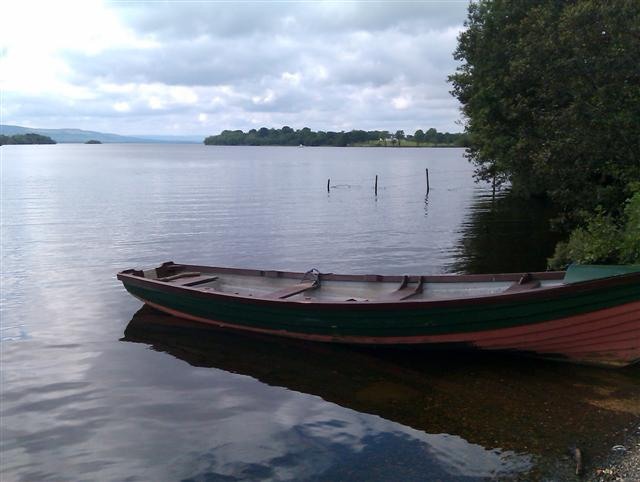
Boat at Boa Island

Boa Island (from Irish Badhbha) is an island near the north shore of Lower Lough Erne in County Fermanagh, Northern Ireland. It is 16 miles (26 km) from Enniskillen town. It is the largest island in Lough Erne, approximately 5 miles (8.0 km) long, and relatively narrow. The A47 road goes through the length of the island and joins each end of the island to the mainland by bridges leading west toward Castle Caldwell and east toward Kesh.

Boa Island features a counterscarp rath (grid ref: H0744 6250) as well as carved stones, graveyard and enclosure (grid ref: H0852 6197), all in Dreenan townland and all Scheduled Historic Monuments.

The two sided Lustymore stone figure was moved here in 1939 from the nearby island of the same name. It and the similar Dreenan figure are collectively known as the archaeologically significant Boa Island figures. Both are thought to date from the 1st century AD. The oldest stone monument on the island is a denuded cairn at Inishkeeragh Bridge near the southern tip of the island.

== Stone figures ==
The Boa Island figures are two stone statues in the island's Caldragh graveyard. They are assumed to date from the Irish Iron Age period and consist of two anthropomorphic carved stone statues known as the Dreenan and Lustymore figures.

Both figures were badly damaged when found. They are today placed beside each other on unrelated pillars in the graveyard, which is the original location of the Boa figure. A canopy was placed over them to protect them from the weather, however this has since been removed. Both of the stone figures are generally accepted to be the likeness of pagan deities. The graveyard itself dates from the Irish early Christian period (400–800 AD).

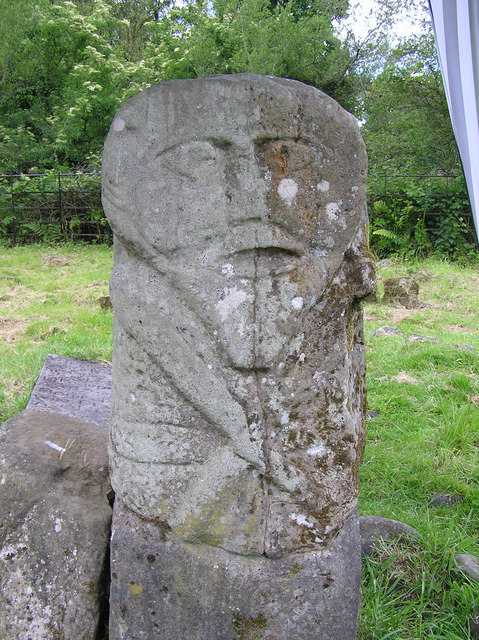
One side of the Janus (two headed) figure

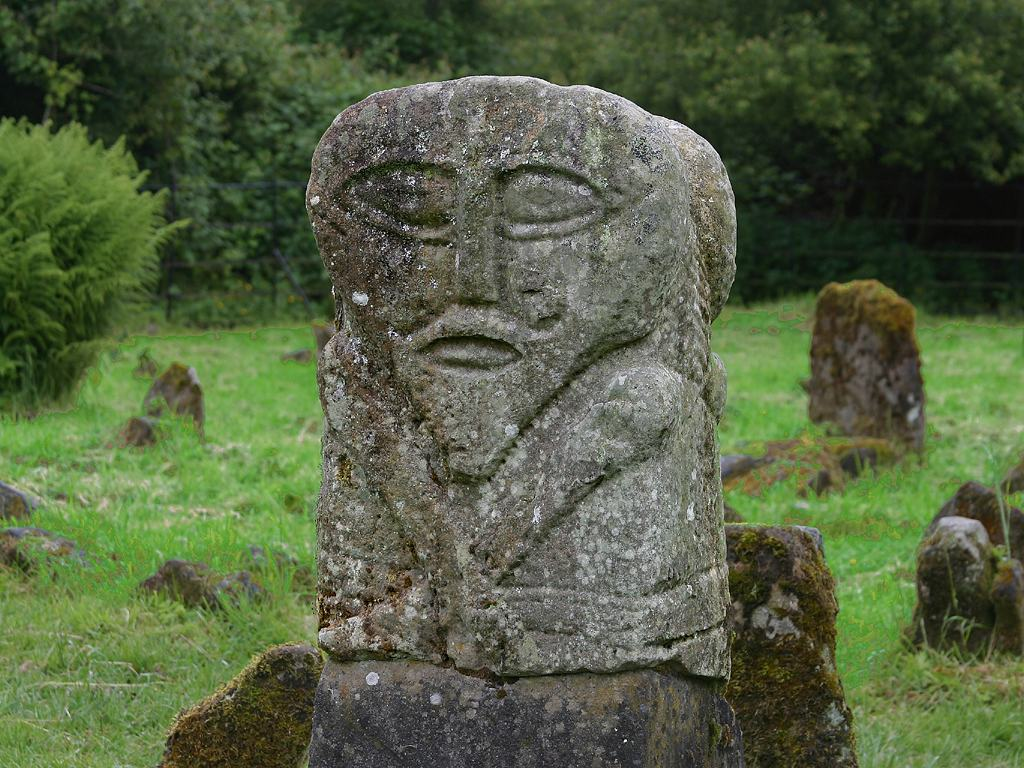
The other side of the Janus figure, with its protruding tongue

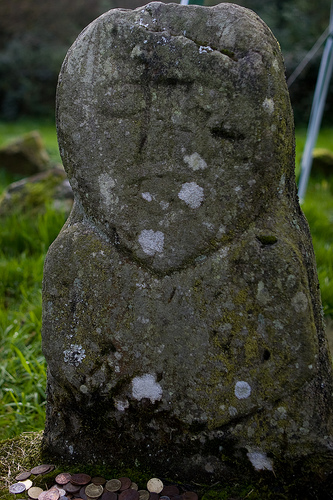
The smaller Dreenan figure

== Plane crash ==
On 9 January 1944, a Royal Air Force Consolidated PBY Catalina (FP193) flying boat departed RAF Killadeas on a bombing exercise. The aircraft crashed into the lough near the island after the crew lost control during a turn. Seven of the ten crewmen died in the crash.

== Sources ==
- Eogan, George; Herity, Michael. Ireland in Prehistory. London: Routledge, 2013. ISBN 978-1-3158-8762-3
- Lowry-Corry, Dorothy. "The Stones Carved with Human Effigies on Boa Island and on Lustymore Island, in Lower Lough Erne". Proceedings of the Royal Irish Academy: Archaeology, Culture, History, Literature, volume 41, 1932. JSTOR 25515968
- Ó Hogain, Dáithí. "Patronage & Devotion in Ancient Irish Religion". History Ireland, volume 8, no. 4, winter 2000. JSTOR 27724824
- Rynne, Etienn. "Celtic Stone Idols in Ireland". In: Thomas, Charles. The Iron Age in the Irish Sea province: papers given at a C.B.A. conference held at Cardiff, January 3 to 5, 1969. London: Council for British Archaeology, 1972
- Waddell, John. The Prehistoric Archaeology of Ireland. Galway: Galway University Press, 1998. ISBN 978-1-8698-5739-4
- Warner, Richard. "Two pagan idols – remarkable new discoveries". Archaeology Ireland, volume 17, no. 1, 2003
