= Martin Hochleitner =

Austrian art historian (born 1970)

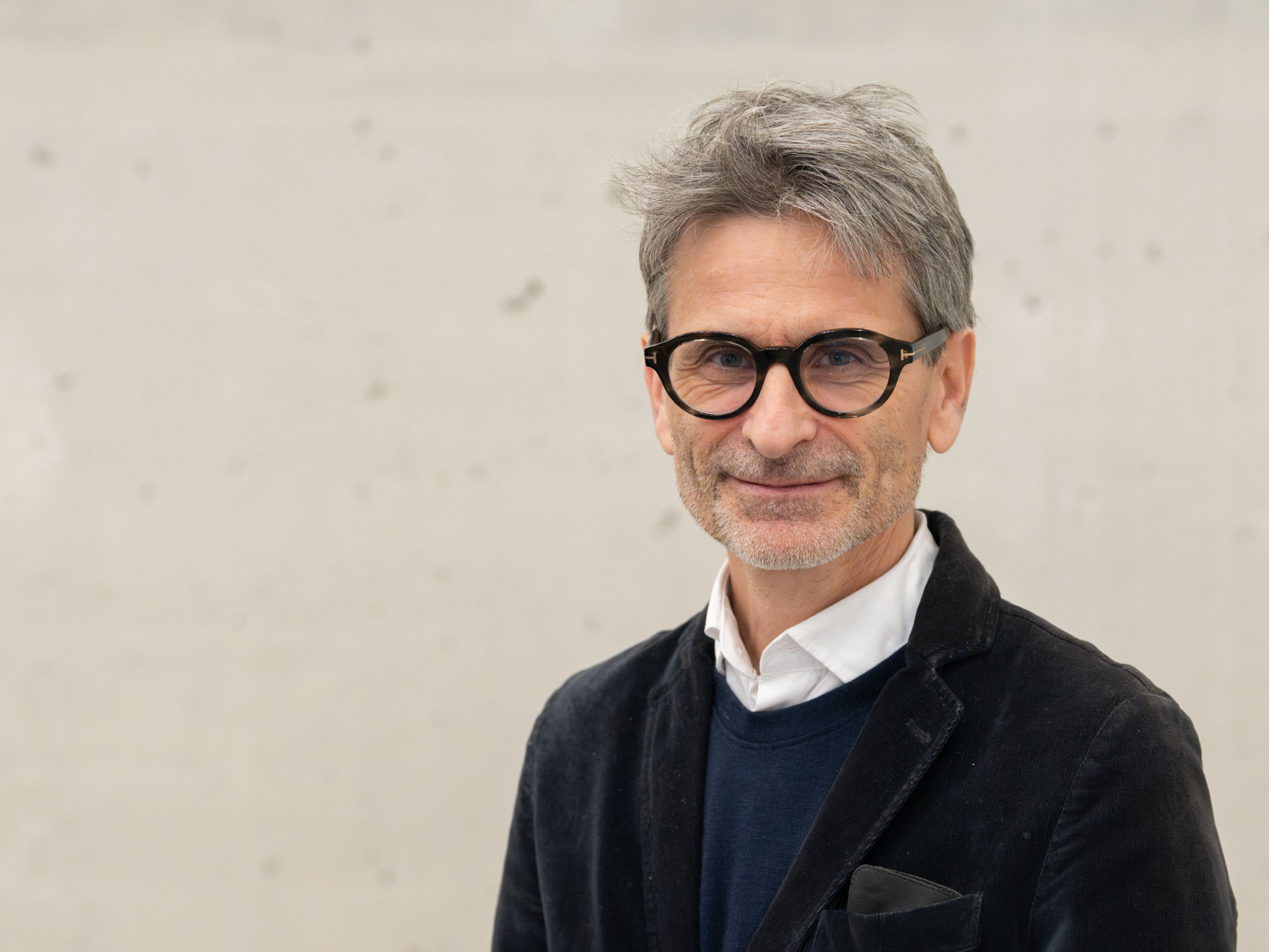
Portrait of Martin Hochleitner in 2025

Martin Hochleitner (born 1970) is an Austrian art historian and since 2012, curator of the Salzburg Museum.

== Life ==
Born in Salzburg, Hochleitner completed his studies in classical archaeology at the University of Salzburg in 1992 with the title of Mag. phil. In 2002, he completed his studies in art history at the University of Salzburg with the title Dr. phil. He wrote his dissertation on the subject of Fundamentals and Reception of Sculptural Forms of Appearance in 20th Century Upper Austrian Art (Grundlagen und Rezeption skulpturaler Erscheinungsformen in der oberösterreichischen Kunst des 20. Jahrhunderts.)

From 1993 to 2000, he was a staff member at the Institute for Cultural Promotion of the Province of Upper Austria (head of the promotion areas fine arts, photography, film, new media and architecture) and director of the gallery in the Stifterhaus together with Peter Assmann. In 2000, he took over the management of the Landesgalerie Linz at the Oberösterreichische Landesmuseen, which he held until 2012. He has been director of the Salzburg Museum since September 2012.

Since 1997, he has taught art history at the University of Art and Design Linz, where he was head of the Department of Art History and Theory / Gender Studies between 2008 and 2010. In 2010, he was appointed university professor for art history and art theory / focus on curatorial practice. Since 2005 he has taught at the Institute for Art Studies and Philosophy at the Catholic Theological Private University in Linz, since 2010 also as Honorary Professor for cultural studies. In the 2007/08 academic year, he held a visiting professorship for photo theory at the University of Applied Arts Vienna.

== Projects ==
Hochleitner conceived and organised, among others, the architecture symposium at the ORF regional studios and the gallery in the Stifterhaus in Linz. Cooperations arose with, among others, the Ars Electronica, O.K. Centrum für Gegenwartskunst, Linz and the University of Art and Design Linz. He is also curator of countless exhibitions, among others the annual exhibition at the Salzburg Kunstverein, "regie" by Edgar Honetschläger, "Es ist still draußen" by Gabriele Rothemann.

== Publications ==
- Martin Hochleitner (ed.): Oberösterreich. Bildende Kunst 1945 bis 1955.
