= Salzburg Museum =

Salzburg Museum (formerly Carolino Augusteum)
- Museum logo
- Established: 1834 (at the site in 2005)
- Location: Salzburg
- Coordinates: 47.798611111°N 13.047777777°E
- Type: Art museum
- Visitors: 849.000 (2024)
- Director: Martin Hochleitner
- Architects: Vincenzo Scamozzi (Bau), Kaschl – Mühlfellner (Adaption)
- Owners: city and state of Salzburg (Salzburg Museum GmbH), Salzburg Museum Association
- Website: www.salzburgmuseum.at

The Salzburg Museum is the museum of artistic and cultural history of the city and region of Salzburg, Austria. It originated as the Provincialmuseum and was also previously known as the Museum Carolino-Augusteum. It is housed in the Neue Residenz, to which it moved in 2005.

== History ==
=== Origins ===
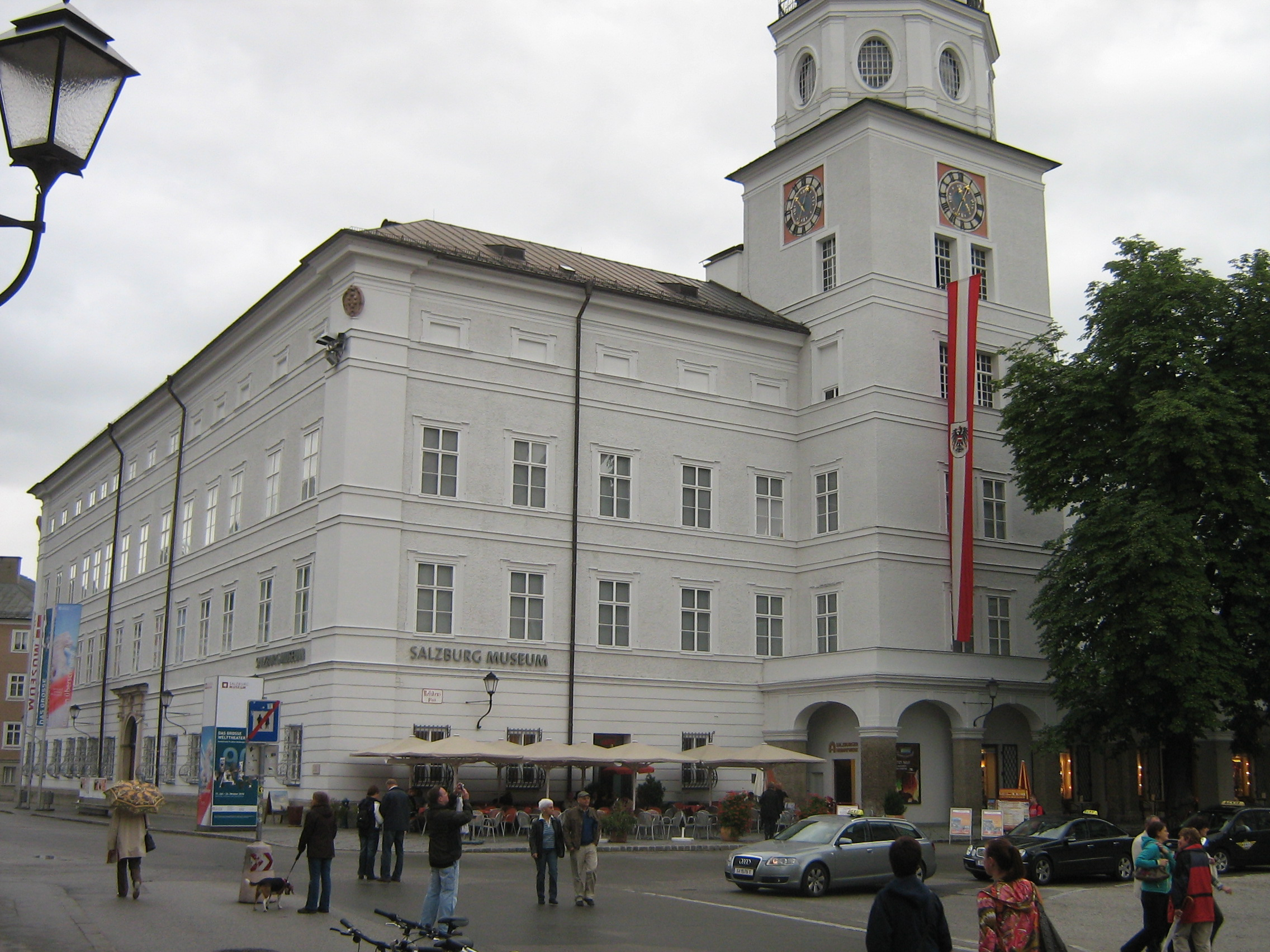
The Museum in 2010

The Salzburg Museum was founded in 1834, when a small collection of military memorabilia was made accessible to the public to formalize the memories of the Napoleonic Wars. After the Revolution of 1848, the collection became the official town museum of Salzburg.

=== 20th century ===
In 1924, the natural history objects of the museum were given to the Haus der Natur Salzburg. One year later, the folk culture collection opened a side-branch in the Monatsschlössl in the parks of Hellbrunn Palace.

During World War II, the museum got three direct hits from bombs. Most of the collection had already been moved to mines that served as bunkers; however, the building was completely destroyed along with many objects too large to move. Several objects disappeared from their bunkers during the US occupation, including a collection of gold coins that had been kept in the salt mines of Hallein. A new building was opened as a provisory museum in 1967. A debate about the final and most worthy location for the headquarters of the Salzburg Museum lasted for decades. Side-branches of the Salzburg Museum were opened during this time: The Domgrabungsmuseum in 1974, the Spielzeugmuseum (Toy Museum) in 1978, and a newly developed Festungsmuseum (Fortress Museum) in 2000. By 1997, promoted by Landeshauptmann Franz Schausberger, local politicians had finally agreed on the Neue Residenz as a new venue for the Salzburg Museum.

=== 21st century ===
The museum reopened in the Neue Residenz in 2005. In 2009, the museum received the European Museum of the Year Award. The museum's main location at Neue Residenz is currently closed for renovations and expansion. The building will re-open in 2026 and also house the upcoming "Belvedere Salzburg" museum, in cooperation with Österreichische Galerie Belvedere. 2025 will also see the opening of a new building at the historic Orangery of Mirabell Palace which will be the new home of the "Sattler Panorama". Between March 2024 and 2026, while the main house is closed, Salzburg Museum holds guest performances in the form of exhibitions in various Salzburg institutions.

== Collections ==
- Furniture from the Anif Palace
- Mohr arrangement (c. 1820) of Silent Night
- The earliest ever example of a bass clarinet
- Original manuscript of the Missa Salisburgensis à 53 voci
- Hohensalzburg head, 1st century Celtic marble head.
