= Francis Harvey (poet) =

Irish poet and playwright

Francis Harvey (13 April 1925 – 7 November 2014) was an Irish poet and playwright. He was born in Enniskillen, County Fermanagh, Northern Ireland. Harvey had lived in County Donegal for most of his life.

His collections of poetry include In the Light on the Stones (1978), The Rainmakers (1988), The Boa Island Janus (1996), Making Space, New & Selected Poems (2000), and Collected Poems (2007), which had an introduction by Moya Cannon. He had also written successful plays. Harvey's poem "Heron" won the 1989 Guardian and World Wildlife Fund Poetry Competition. In 1990 he won a Peterloo Poets Prize and was a prizewinner in the Cardiff International Poetry Competition. He received an Arts Council Bursary in 1991. He had also won The Irish Times/Yeats Summer School Prize. On 7 November 2014, he died at the age of 89. He was a member of Aosdána.
