= Mšecké Žehrovice Head =

Celtic sculpture from present-day Czechia, 150–50 BCE

Coordinates: 50.1698°N 13.9213°E

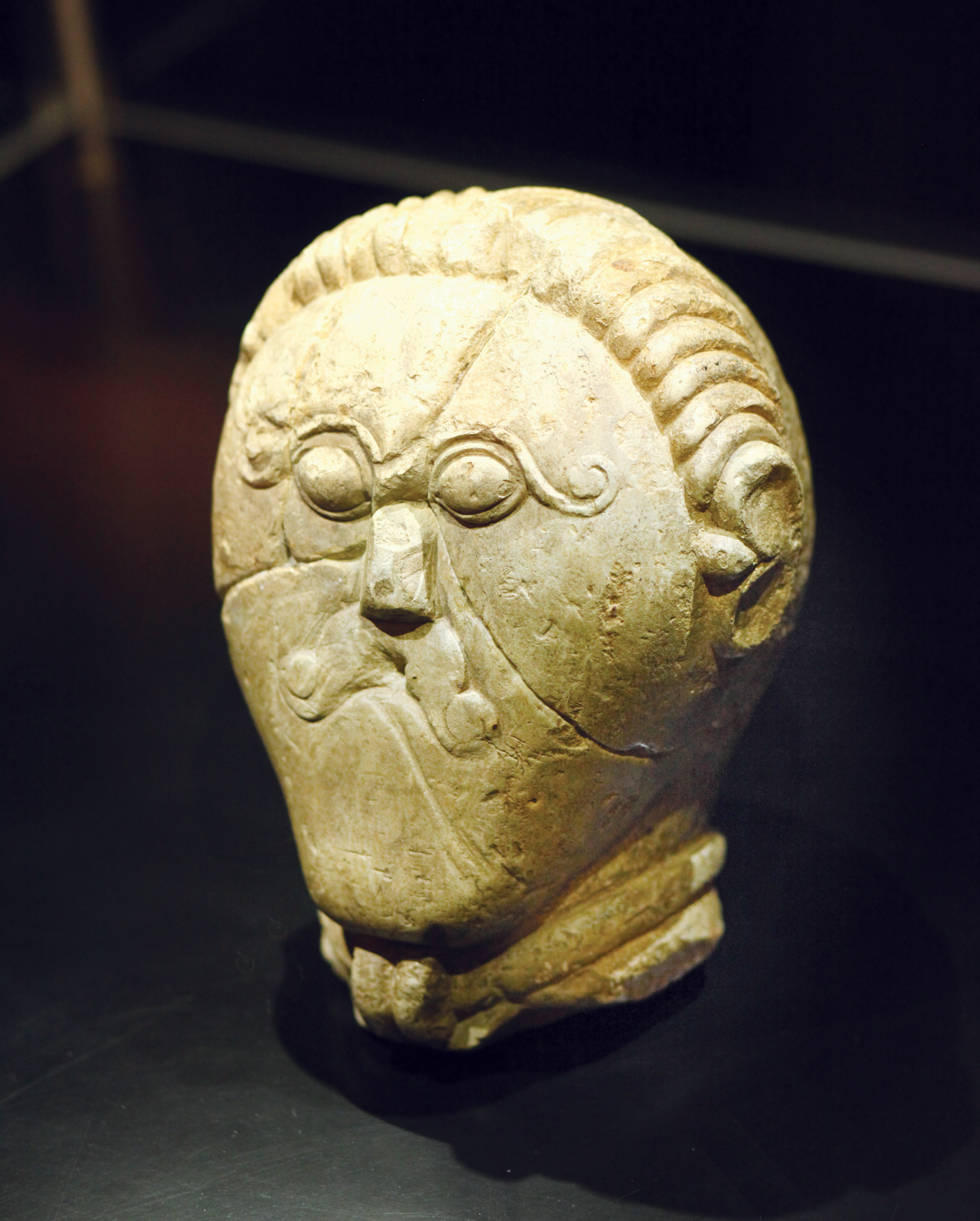
The Celtic Hero from Bohemia

The Mšecké Žehrovice Head is a male sculpted head from c. 150–50 BC found at the double Viereckschanze site in Mšecké Žehrovice, about 65 km northwest of Prague, Czech Republic. It is one of the best known works of Celtic art from Iron Age Europe, and, along with the Glauberg "Prince" and the Warrior of Hirschlanden, one of the few large representations of the human figure. After its discovery in 1943, the sculpture became one of the most photographed, reproduced and published La Tène (cc. 450–50 B.C.) objects ever.

The sculpture is now in the Nové Strašecí Museum. A copy of it can also be seen in the Prague National Museum.

With its iconic moustache, owl-like eyes, torc ornament and unique hairstyle, the marlstone head became an icon of Celtic Europe, featured on the covers of scientific as well as populist publications concentrating on Iron Age Europe related issues.

== Format ==
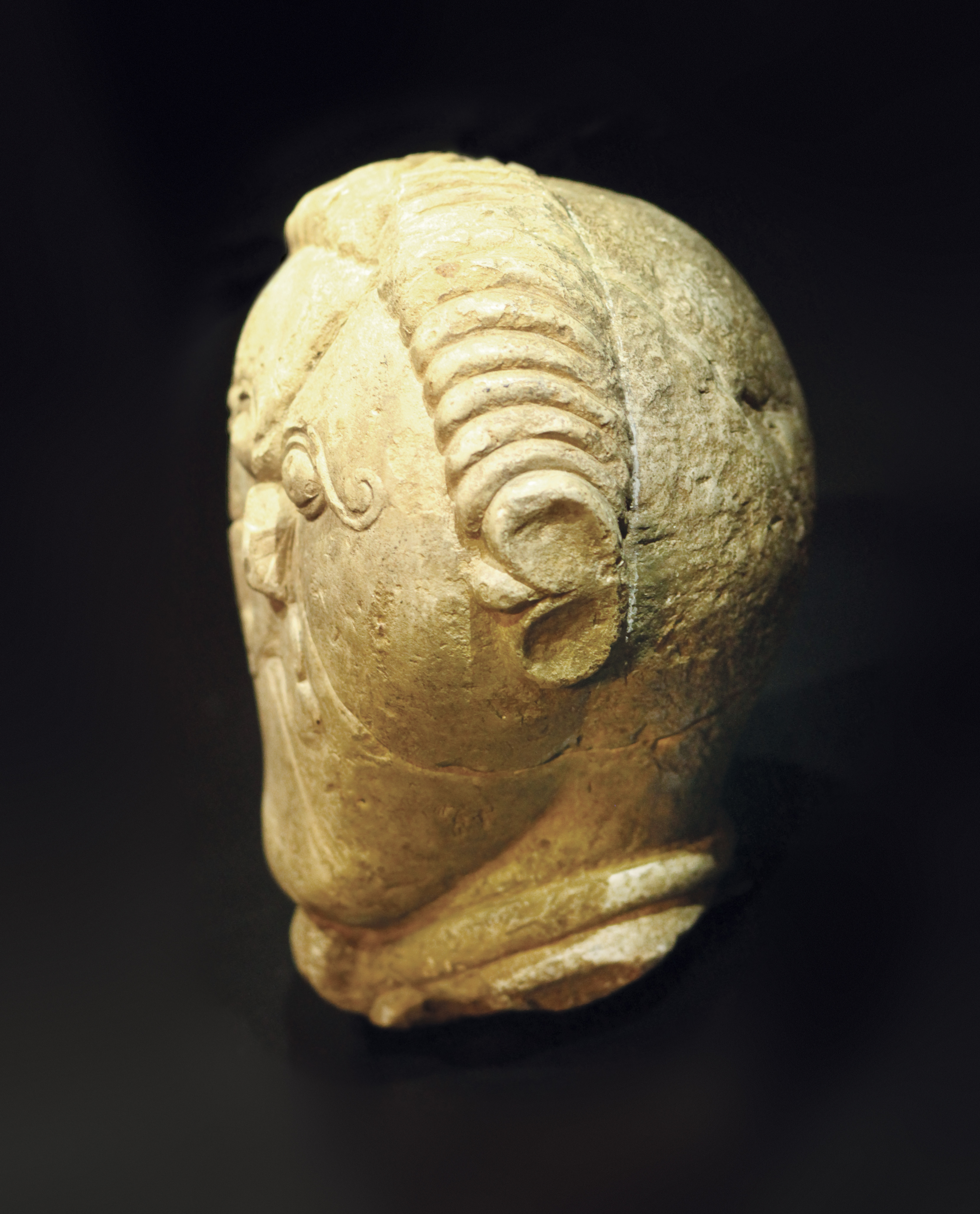
Side view, showing the tonsure to the rear of the head

The stone head, sculpted from local Cretaceous limestone, has a maximum height of 234 mm and width of 174 mm. The sculpture was broken into at least five pieces sometime in antiquity. Four pieces have been found in fairly good condition. However, the missing fragment or possibly fragments, the right-hand side of the head including the upper part of the ear, have not yet been found. The heavily stylized facial features are projected on an almost flat surface surrounded by braid-like shaped hair. At the back of the head the hair appears to be shaved in a tonsure. The most prominent are the bulging oval eyes, contoured by a curvilinear eyebrow matching a similarly imposing curvilinear moustache.

The mouth is suggested by a mere downward bending line. The ears are not naturalistic but rather represented as lotus buds, a stylistic form representative of La Tène art. The neck is formed in the shape of a torc, a traditional Celtic necklace. A similar torc can be seen on the second-century B.C. sculpture of a Dying Gaul from Pergamon.

== Background ==
The visual imagery of the La Tène period was characterized by an ubiquitous appearance of an anthropomorphic head symbol typical of Central and Western Celtic Europe These images were skillfully entwined in ornaments, handles, jewelry and reliefs fashioned mostly of metals. Anthropomorphic sculpture itself was extraordinarily rare and few examples survive today. The Celtic Hero was found during a course of 1943 excavation of an oppidum in Mšecké Žehrovice in central Bohemia, Czech Republic. The sculpture was buried in a pit on a southwest corner of a square enclosure located within the oppidum. Other artifacts found in the pit include burned animal bones that date the feature to late La Tène period LT C2-D1 (approx. 150–50 BC.), pottery sherds, pieces of saprolite and a piece of iron wire. The dating of the pit is further supported by the typology of the pottery sherds which also place the interment of the sculpture to approx. mid 2nd to mid 1st century BC.

== See also ==
- Corleck Head
- Hohensalzburg head
- Bon Marché head
