= Anne Ross (archaeologist) =

British archaeologist (1925–2012)

- Born: 1925
- Died: 29 August 2012 (aged 86–87)
- Occupation: Archaeologist

Academic background
- Education: University of Edinburgh

Academic work
- Discipline: Archaeology
- Sub-discipline: Ancient Celtic religion and culture
- Notable works: Everyday Life of the Pagan Celts

Anne Ross (1925 – 29 August 2012) was a British Celtic scholar and archaeologist. Her area of focus was ancient Celtic culture and religion, particularly Druidism and the cult of the head. She was considered one of Britain's leading Celtic scholars. Her book Pagan Celtic Britain is a central text in Romano-British studies. Ross was involved in studying and publicising the supposedly paranormal Hexham Heads.

Ross was married to fellow archaeologist Richard Feachem. They had a daughter named Berenice and a son named Charles.

She was featured on television shows such as Out of the Past (1969), The Celts (1987) and The Celts (2000).

== Education ==
Ross studied at the University of Edinburgh, where she earned her MA and PhD. She was a Research Fellow in the School of Scottish Studies, Edinburgh.

== Notable works ==
- Pagan Celtic Britain: Studies in Iconography and Tradition (1967)
- Everyday Life of Pagan Celts (1970)
- Grotesques and Gargoyles: Paganism in the Medieval Church (1975)
- A Traveller's Guide to Celtic Britain (1985)
- The Pagan Celts (1986)
- The Life and Death of a Druid Prince (1989)
- Folklore of Wales (2001)
