= Dáithí Ó hÓgáin =

Irish scholar (1949–2011)

- Portrait of Dáithí Ó hÓgáin by Bill Doyle
- Born: Dáithí Ó hÓgáin; 13 June 1949; Bruff, County Limerick, Ireland
- Died: 11 December 2011 (aged 62); Bray, County Wicklow, Ireland
- Education: University College Dublin
- Occupations: Folklorist, writer, poet
- Writing career
- Notable works: Myth, Legend and Romance - an Encyclopaedia of the Irish Folk Tradition

Dáithí Ó hÓgáin (13 June 1949 – 11 December 2011) was an Irish writer, poet and professor of Irish folklore at University College Dublin. Born in County Limerick, he wrote extensively in both the English and Irish languages.

== Life and works ==
Dáithí Ó hÓgáin was born in Bruff, County Limerick, on 13 June 1949, a son of former jockey Davy Hogan and Mary (née Tyrell).

He obtained a BA in Modern Languages (Irish, English) History and Philosophy, then an MA in 1971 in Irish at University College Dublin, followed by a PhD in Folklore in 1976. His doctoral thesis at UCD, overseen by Bo Almqvist was later republished as An File (The Poet) in 1983. Its theme was the lore of how poets received the gift of poetry, and the supernatural powers poetry could manifest according to folk tradition. Before obtaining his doctorate, he had an 18-month stint as a radio journalist at Raidió Teilifís Éireann (RTÉ).

While at the department, he gained acquaintance with three important scholars in the field, Seán Ó Súilleabháin, Caoimhín Ó Danachair and Séamus Ó Duilearga, the founding father of Irish folklore scholarship. He also served as rector of An Cumann Gaelach while at UCD.

Ó hÓgáin wrote many books, including six poetry collections and one in English, and three short story collections, eight research books, and numerous research articles on literature, folklore, history and etymology, in scholarly journals and in encyclopaedias. One notable effort was the massive tome, Myth, Legend and Romance - an Encyclopaedia of the Irish Folk Tradition (1990), later reissued under the title The Lore of Ireland: an Encyclopaedia of Myth, Legend and Romance (2006), covering a wide range of folkloric material, from ancient times into the modern.

He was instrumental in drafting UNESCO's recommendations on the protection of world folklore in 1987, and was co-founder of the European Center for Traditional Culture in Budapest in 1994. He rose from associate professor to professor at the Folklore Department at UCD, but was forced into early retirement in 2009 due to failing health.

He lectured and read his poetry throughout Ireland and other countries: England, Wales, Scotland, France, Monaco, Belgium, Germany, Poland, Lithuania, Estonia, Russia, Hungary and Iceland. He is well known as a radio and television broadcaster, and produced four radio dramas.

== Selected publications ==
Poetry

- Cois Camhaoireach (1981). Dublin: Clóchomhar. 64 pp.
- Cóngar na gCrosán (1985). Dublin: Coiscéim. 62 pp.
- Idir an Dá Dhealbh (1988). Dublin: Coiscéim. 63 pp.
- Gadaí an Cheoil (1994). Dublin: Clóchomhar. 88 pp.
- Footsteps From Another World (2001). London: Philome. 171 pp.
- Ár gCogar Ciúin (2002). Dublin: Clóchomhar. 80 pp.

Short stories

- Breacadh (1973). Cork and Dublin: Mercier. 118 pp.
- Imeall an Bhaile (1986). Dublin: Clóchomhar. 103 pp.
- Scéalta Nua (2001). Dublin: Clóchomhar. 90 pp.

== Research ==
- An File (1982). Dublin: Foilseacháin Rialtais. 475 pp. [Staidéar ar chumhachtaí osnádúrtha an fhile agus na filíochta i dtraidisiún na Gaeilge].
- The Hero in Irish Folk History (1985). Dublin: Gill & Macmillan / New York:St Martin's Press. 354 pp.
- Fionn Mac Cumhaill: Images of the Gaelic Hero (1988). Dublin: Gill & Macmillan. 361 pp.
- Myth, Legend and Romance - an Encyclopaedia of the Irish Folk Tradition (1990), London: Ryan Publishing; (1991), Prentice Hall: New York. 453 pp.
- Irish Superstitions (1995). Dublin: Gill & Macmillan, 96 pp.; repr. (2002), 126 pp.
- Celtic Warriors (1999), London: Pegasus, 128 pp.
- The Sacred Isle: belief and religion in pre-Christian Ireland (1999). Cork: Collins Press: / Suffolk: Boydell & Brewer. 259 pp.
- Historic Ireland (2001). London: Salamander / Dublin: Gill & Macmillan. 144 pp.
- The Celts - a History (Collins Press: Cork / Boydell Press: Suffolk, 2002), 297 pp.
- Ireland – People and Places (2003). London: Salamander / Dublin: Gill & Macmillan. 144 pp.

== Edited works ==
- Duanaire Osraíoch, ed., (1980). Dublin: Clóchomhar. 149 pp. [Poetry from Kilkenny].
- Duanaire Thiobraid Árann, ed., (1981). Dublin: Clóchomhar. 108 pp. [poetry from Tipperary].
- Leabhar Stiofáin Uí Ealaoire, ed., with Séamus Ó Duilearga (1981). Dublin: Irish Folklore Council. 363 pp. [Folklore from County Clare].
- Gold under the Furze, eds., with Alan Gailey (1982). Dublin: Glendale. 253 pp. [Festschrift for Dr Kevin Danaher].
- An Cultúr agus an Duine, eds., with Diarmaid Ó Gráinne (1993). Dublin: Coiscéim. 91 pp. [Essays on culture and creative literature].
- Binneas thar Meon, Vol 1, ed., (1994). Dublin: Irish Folklore Council. 269 pp. [Traditional songs and music from the counties of Waterford, Tipperary, Limerick and Cork]
- Skálda: Éigse is Eachtraíocht sa tSean-Lochlainn, ed., with Bo Almqvist (1995). Dublin: Clóchomhar. 78 pp. [Irish translations of Old Norse lays].
- An Mangaire Súgach: Aindrias Mac Craith, a bheatha agus a shaothar, ed., with Máire Comer Bruen (1996). Dublin: Coiscéim. 264 pp. [Work of the famous 18th century poet].
- A Portrait of Bray, eds., with Eva Ó Cathaoir; Jason Forde (1998). Bray: Pelican Publications. 169 pp.
- Islands and Water-Dwellers, eds., with Patricia Lysaght; Séamas Ó Catháin (1999). Dublin: DBA Publications. 414 pp. Proceedings of the Celtic-Nordic-Baltic Folklore Symposium held at University College Dublin 16–19 June 1996. [On the folklore of seas, lakes and rivers].
- Binsín Luachra: Gearrscéalta agus Seanchas eds., with Proinsias de Róiste (2001). Dublin: Clóchomhar. 144 pp. [Irish folklore and short stories from Limerick ].
- Labhrann Laighnigh: Téacsanna agus cainteanna ó shean-Chúige Laighean (2011). Dublin: Coiscéim. 247 pp.

== Sources ==
- Almqvist, Bo (2012), "In Memoriam: Dáithí Ó hÓgáin 1949-2011", Béaloideas, 80: 193–199, JSTOR 24862877
