= Corleck Head =

Iron Age carved stone head from Ireland

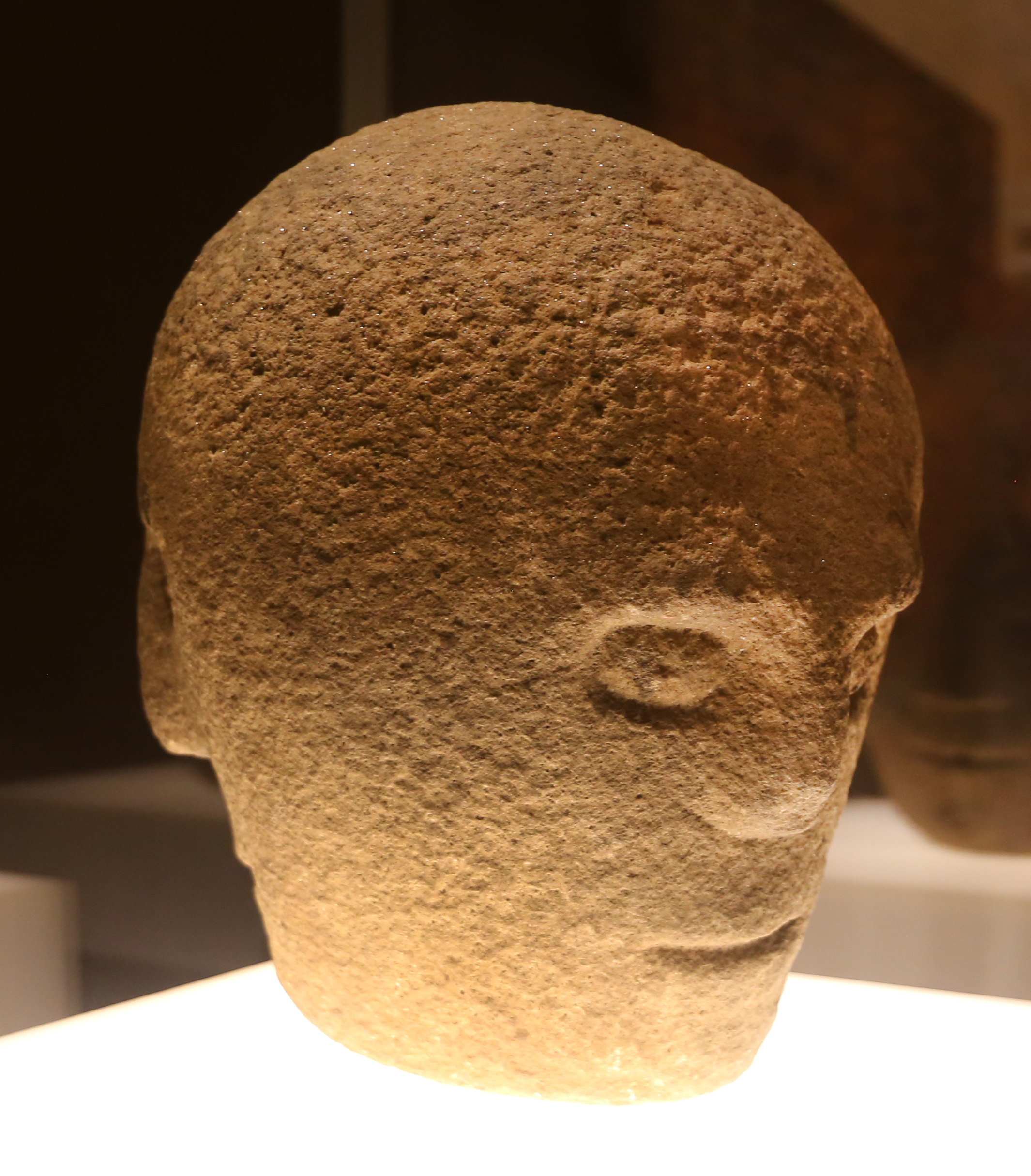
- Two of the head's three faces
- Material: Limestone
- Size: Height: 33 cm (13 in); Width (max): 22.5 cm (8.9 in)
- Created: 1st or 2nd century AD
- Discovered: c. 1855; Corleck Hill, County Cavan, Ireland; 53.9725°N 6.9981°W
- Present location: National Museum of Ireland, Dublin

The Corleck Head is a 1st- or 2nd-century AD three-faced Irish stone idol discovered in Drumeague in County Cavan c. 1855. Its dating to the Iron Age is based on its iconography, which is similar to that of contemporary northern European Celtic art artefacts. Most archaeologists believe that it probably depicts a Celtic god and was intended to be placed on top of a larger shrine.

The head is carved from a single block of limestone into three simply described faces. They each have similar features, including protruding eyes, thin and narrow mouths and enigmatic expressions. The head's exact dating and cultural significance are difficult to establish. The faces may depict all-knowing, all-seeing gods representing the unity of the past, present and future. The head is assumed to have been intended for ceremonial use on the nearby Corleck Hill, a major religious centre during the late Iron Age and a site for celebration of the Lughnasadh, a pre-Christian harvest festival.

Most archaeologists assume the head was buried in the Early Middle Ages. When unearthed, the sculpture was regarded as an insignificant local curiosity and for decades was placed on a farm gatepost. Its age was realised in 1937 by the local historian Thomas J. Barron and the Austrian archaeologist Adolf Mahr, director of the National Museum of Ireland (NMI). Since Mahr's acquisition, the head has been on permanent display at the NMI.

== Discovery ==
The Corleck Head was unearthed around 1855 by the farmer James Longmore while looking for stones to build a farmhouse. Longmore found the head in the townland of Drumeague (Irish: Droim Éag, meaning 'ridge of death'), site of an ancient wedge tomb. This is near Corleck Hill, where there was a passage tomb, stone circle and earthworks. These were destroyed between 1832 and 1900 to make way for farming land.

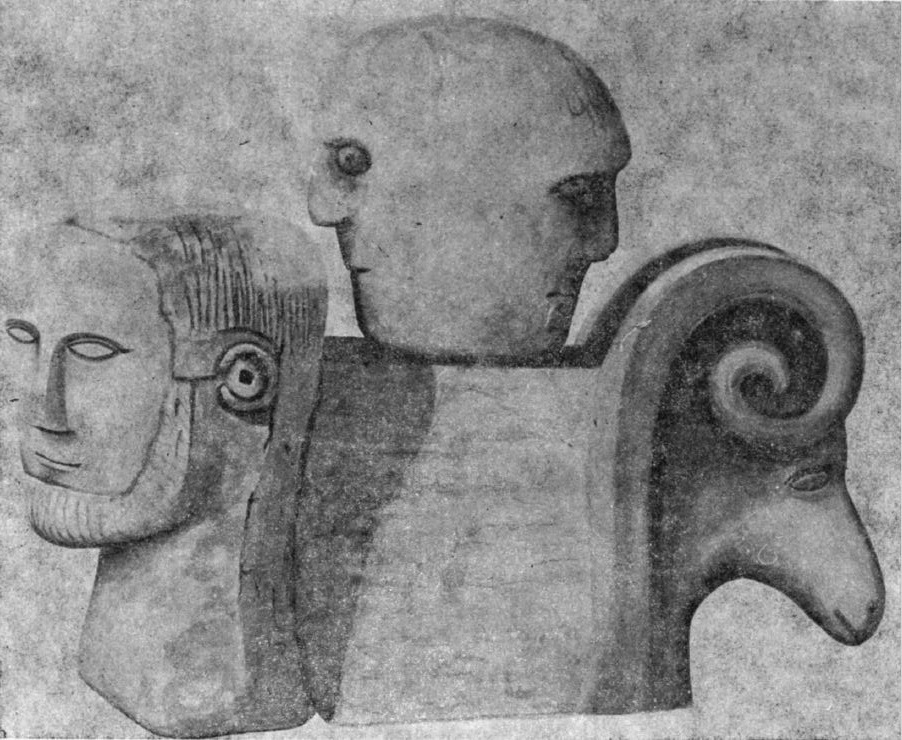
Speculative drawing showing the Corraghy heads to the left and right with the Corleck Head above and centre

The head was discovered near the Corraghy Heads (Note: So named because the human Corraghy head was discovered in 1969 by Barron embedded in the wall of a farmyard barn in the nearby Corraghy townland.)—a stylistically very different janiform sculpture with a ram's head on one side and a human head on the other. They were probably buried around the same time, perhaps c. 900–1200 AD, to hide them from Christian iconoclasts who sought to suppress the memory of older pagan idols.

The folklorist and historian Thomas J. Barron recognised the Corleck Head's age after seeing it in 1934 while a researcher for the Irish Folklore Commission. He established that after Longmore sold the lease on the farm to Thomas Hall in 1865, Hall's son, Sam, placed the Corleck head on a gatepost. Emily Bryce, a relative of the Halls, remembered childhood visits to the farm and throwing stones at the head, having no idea of its age. Around this time Sam Hall inadvertently destroyed a large part of the Corraghy Heads while trying to separate its heads. Barron contacted the National Museum of Ireland (NMI) in 1937 after which its director Adolf Mahr arranged their loan to the museum for study. Mahr presented and described the head in a lecture to the Royal Society of Antiquaries of Ireland that year. Study of the head and similar stone idols was to preoccupy Barron until his death in 1992.

Corleck is one of six areas in the northern province of Ulster where clusters of apparently related stone idols have been found. (Note: The others are Cathedral Hill in Armagh town, the Newtownhamilton and Tynan areas in County Armagh, the southernmost part of Lough Erne in County Fermanagh and the Raphoe region in north-west County Donegal.) Other ancient objects found near Corleck include the 1st-century BC wooden Ralaghan Idol (also brought to attention by Barron), (Note: The townland of Ralaghan is about 7 km (4.3 mi) south-east of Corleck Hill. Barron recalled being approached in a bog by a man holding a large stick-like object which turned out to be the Ralaghan Idol. The man told him that he intended to throw it back into the bog and that "we're getting dozens of these carved sticks and putting them back. You see, you can't take what's been offered ... the other day one of us got a beautiful bowl, bronze or gold ... carved and decorated all over." When Barron asked him where the bowl was now, the man said that they had thrown it back "at once", fearing bad luck to have kept it.) a small contemporary spherical stone head from the nearby townlands of Corravilla, and the Corraghy Heads.

== Description ==
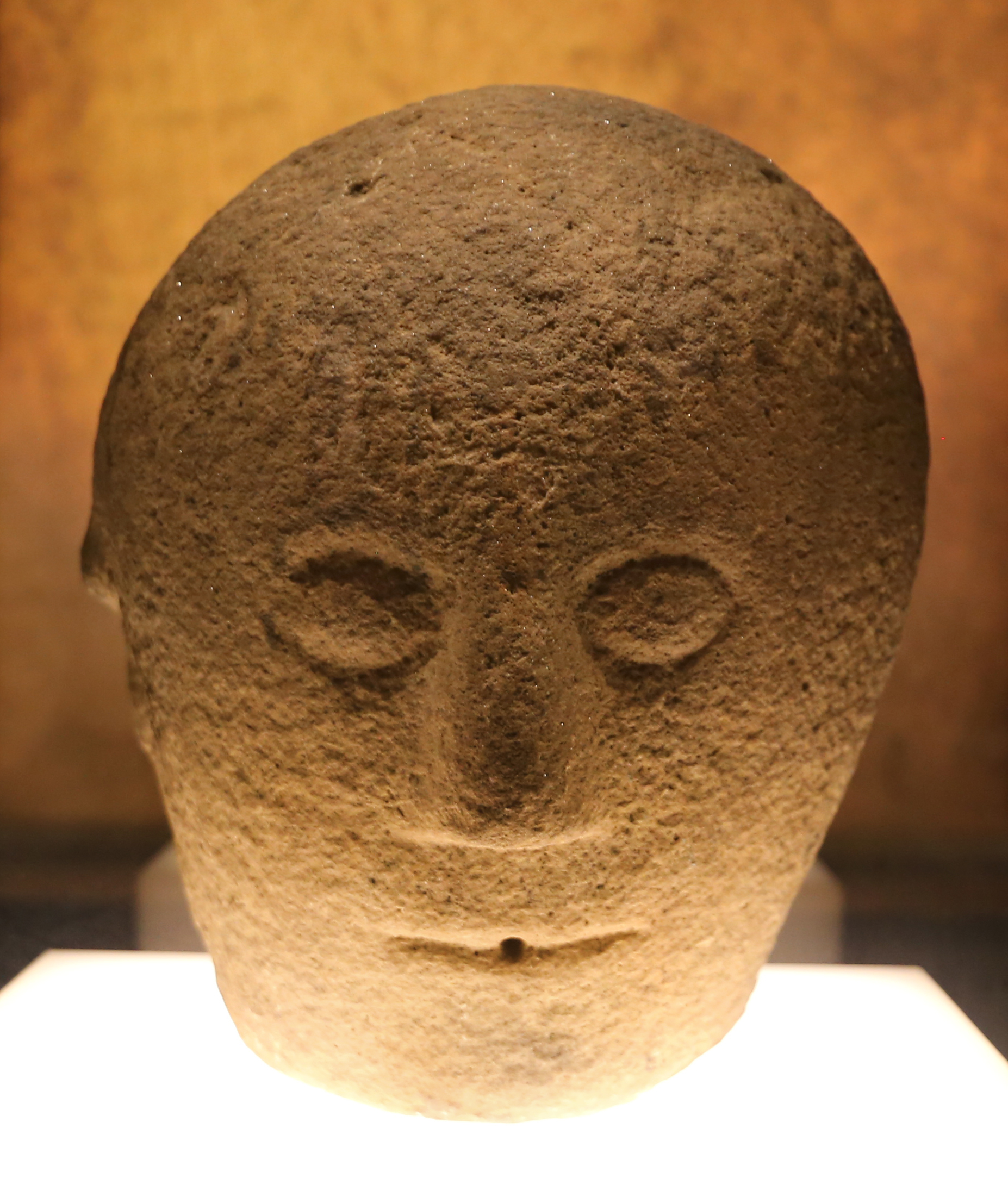
Face with a small hole at the centre of its mouth

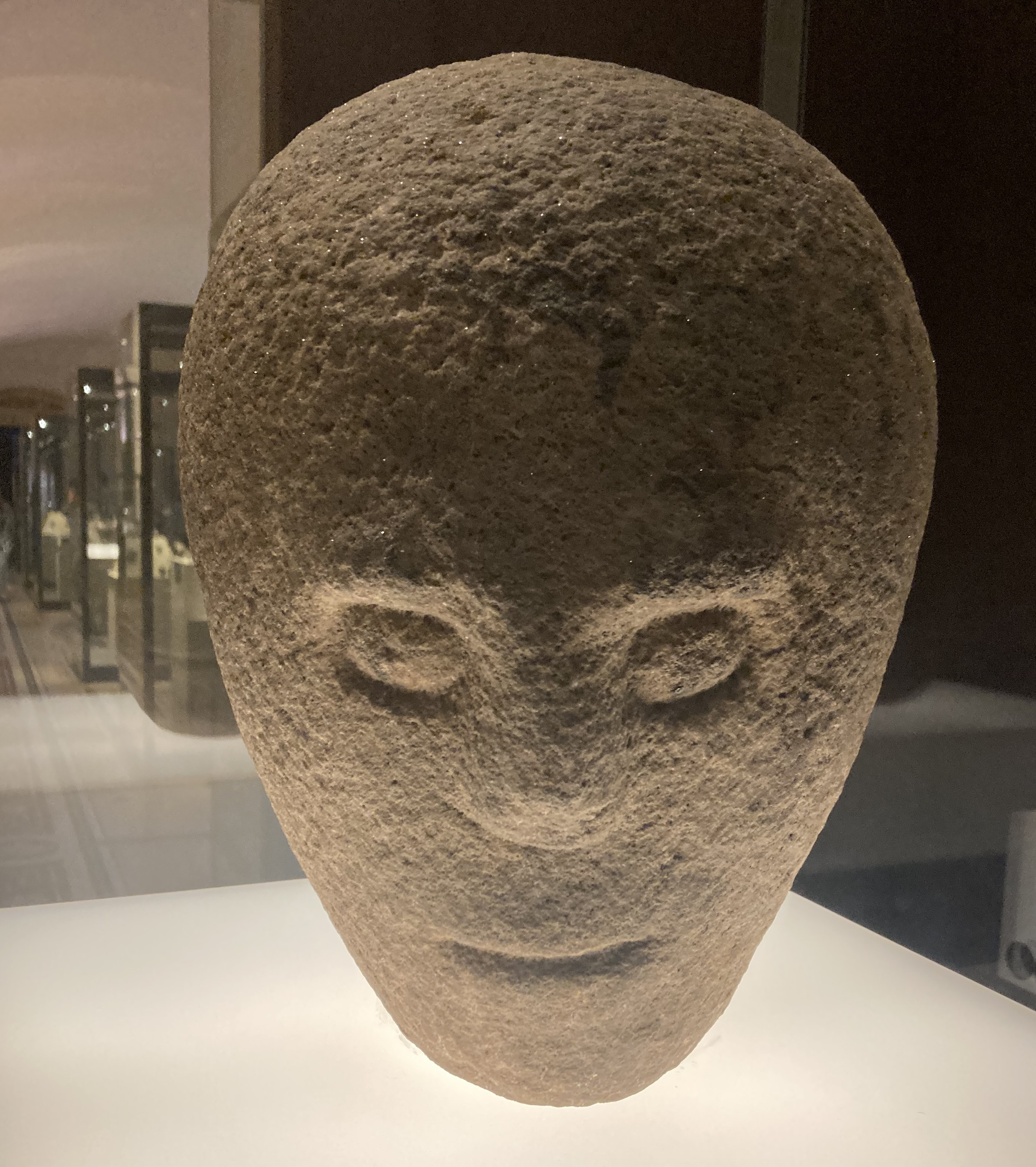
Narrow face with heavy eyebrows

The Corleck Head is formed from a round piece of local limestone carved into a three-faced tricephalic skull. It is a relatively large example of the type, being 33 cm (13 in) high and 22.5 cm (8.9 in) wide at its widest point. The head cuts off just below the chin. The faces are in low relief and could be male or female, but are similar in form and in their enigmatic expressions. Each has basic and simply described features, yet appear to convey slightly different moods. They all have a broad and flat wedge-shaped nose and a thin, narrow, slit mouth. The protruding eyes are wide yet closely set and seem to stare at the viewer; they lack beards and do not have ears. One has heavy eyebrows, and another has a small hole at the centre of its mouth, a feature of unknown significance found on several contemporary Irish stone heads and examples from England, Wales and Bohemia.

Archaeologists assume the Corleck Head was intended as a prominent element of a larger structure containing other stone or wooden sculptures. It has a hole on its base indicating that it may have been intended to be placed on top of a pedestal, likely on a tenon (a protruding joint connecting two pieces of material).

The Corleck Head is widely considered the finest of the Celtic stone idols, largely due to its contrasting simplicity of design and complexity of expression. In 1962 the archaeologist Thomas Paterson wrote that only the triple-head idol found in Cortynan, County Armagh, shares features drawn from such bare outlines. According to Paterson, the Corleck Head indicates a degree of sophistication of craft absent in other contemporary Irish examples. In 1972 the archaeologist Etienn Rynne described the Corleck Head as "unlike all others in its elegance and economy of line".

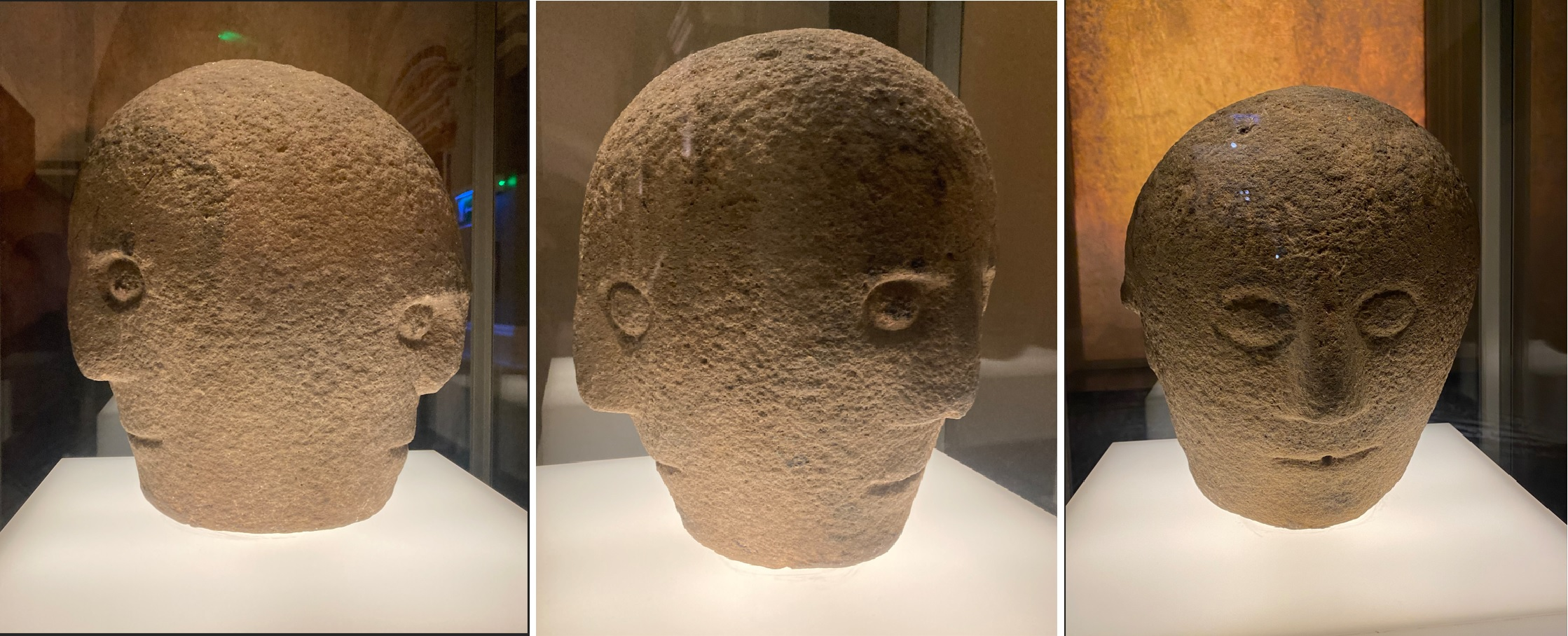
Composite view of the three faces showing them as they would appear if the viewer walked from left to right around the head

== Dating ==
Although most of the idols are thought to originate from between 300 BC and 100 AD, dating stone sculpture is difficult given that techniques such as radiocarbon dating cannot be used. Since the majority were discovered on early Christian church grounds, presumably having been relocated from their original pagan ritual sites, they lack the provenance to conclusively link them to pagan worship.

Stone heads are thus dated on stylistic grounds to works whose dating has been established, in particular to contemporary iconography in Romano-British (between 43 and 410 AD) and Gallo-Roman art (1st century BC to the 5th century AD). Ross has observed that the Corleck Head's style corresponds closely to other representations of the head from the late La Tène period.

The Iron Age dating has been challenged by some archaeologists, including the archaeologist Ian Armit, who notes that there was a folk art revival of stone head carvings in the 17th and 18th centuries. Although most of the Ulster heads are believed to be pre-Christian, other examples in Ireland and Britain have since been identified as from the Middle Ages or early modern period.

== Symbolism and function ==
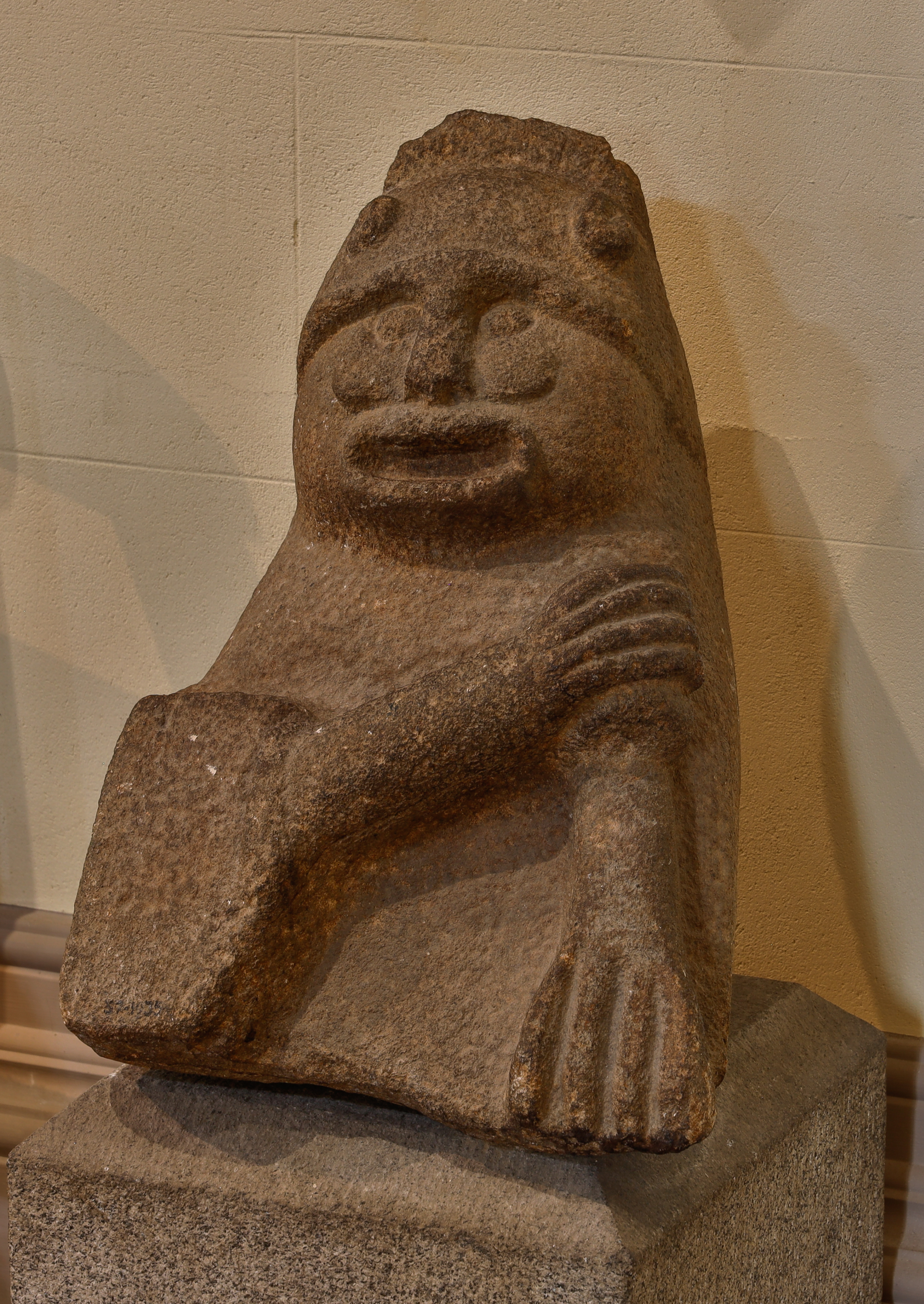
The Tandragee Idol, St Patrick's Cathedral, Armagh

The Corleck Head is one of the earliest known figurative sculptures discovered in Ireland, with the possible exception of the more primitive-looking Tandragee Idol from nearby County Armagh, and the wooden Ralaghan Idol found less than five miles east of Corleck Hill. Archaeological evidence suggests a complex and prosperous Iron Age society that assimilated many outside cultural influences: the early forms of Celtic religion are generally thought to have been introduced to Ireland around the 5th century BC.

The modern consensus is that Irish Celts venerated the head as a symbol of divinity and, according to Ross, "the seat of the soul". Most surviving prehistoric representational Irish sculptures are of human heads, sometimes with multiple faces. Most originate from Ulster and are of heads carved in the round (free-standing without a side attached to a flat background), with shallow carving to depict the faces. The number three also seems to have been especially significant to the Celts. Three-headed figures are a common feature of Celtic art, and according to Ross had a pagan religious significance "fundamental to early Celtic thought and outlook". A small number of other contemporary Irish and British anthropomorphic examples have two or three faces with similar expressions. These include a three-faced stone bust from Woodlands, County Donegal, and two carved triple heads from Greetland in West Yorkshire, England.

Such stone idols were typically associated with ritual sites, and many of the surviving Irish examples were unearthed near sacred wells, rivers or trees, usually on sites later adapted by early Christians. Another example is the 1st-century Boa Island Janus figure, found in an early Christian graveyard but widely believed to be pre-Christian.

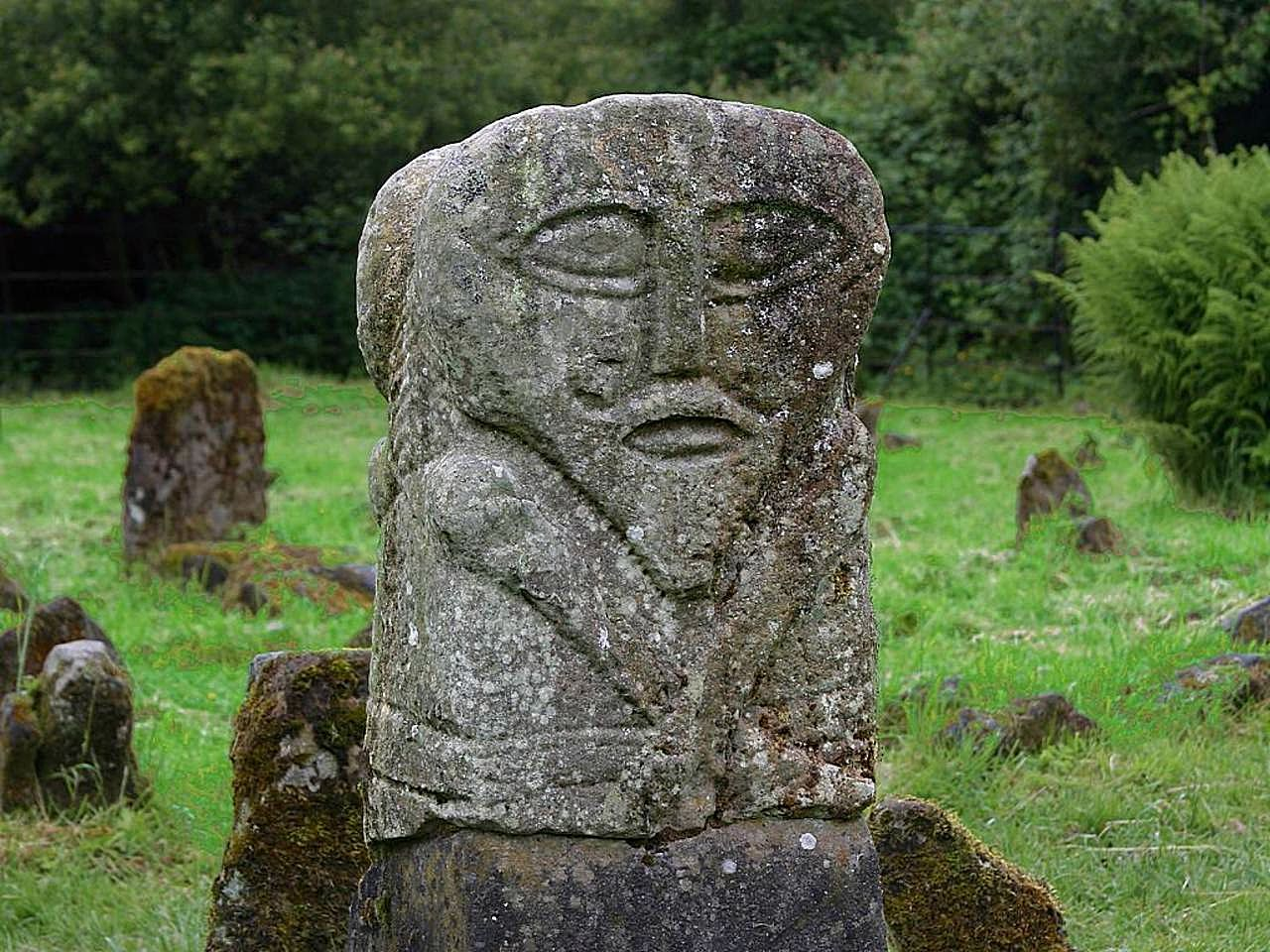
The Janus Boa Island figure

Archaeologists assume the Corleck and Corraghy Heads represent pagan gods and were part of a shrine on Corleck Hill. The hole on the Corleck Idol's base indicates that it was periodically attached to a larger structure, perhaps a pillar comparable to the now-lost 1.8-metre (6 ft) wooden structure found in the 1790s in a bog near Aghadowey, County Londonderry, which was originally capped with a four-headed figure. (Note: The Aghadowey pillar was carved from a tree trunk and had four heads, each with hair, that is today known only from a very simple 19th-century drawing annotated as a "Heathen image found in the bog of Ballybritoan Parish Aghadowey".)

The Corleck area seems to have been an important pagan cult centre during the Iron Age, likely associated with the druids (the priestly caste in ancient Celtic cultures). MacKillop says that the area was once known as "the pulse of Ireland". According to Barron, an Irish mythological name for the region in which Corleck Hill stands was Sliabh na Trí nDée (the "highland of the three gods"). MacKillop later wrote that it was a name for the hill itself. Barron proposed that the three-faces on the Corleck Head represent the "three gods of craftsmanship" (Trí Dé Dána) mentioned in Irish mythology, and that the head as a whole represents the Dagda, the chief god. James MacKillop suggested that the three gods referred to in the placename were the Dagda, Conn, (Note: The son of Ler from the legend of the Children of Lir.) and Ogma.

Until the 19th century, Corleck Hill was a major site for Lughnasadh, a harvest festival of ancient origin named after the Celtic god Lugh, a warrior king and master craftsman of the Tuatha Dé Danann – a divine race in Irish mythology. (Note: The Lughnasadh was one of the quarterly Gaelic calendar festivals, the others being the Samhain (beginning of winter), Imbolc (spring) and Bealtaine (summer).) In her study on Lughnasadh, folklorist Máire MacNeill highlights several Irish legends about severed heads. One is a tale about Coirpre Crom, who was killed and his head placed on a flagstone at the beginning of harvest. Saint Ciarán of Clonmacnoise recovers the head, banishes a demon from it, and brings Coirpre back to life. Another legend says that Crom Dubh, a figure associated with Lughnasadh, was buried for three days with only his head above ground. MacNeill believes that the Corleck Head represents Crom Dubh. She suggests there was a custom of taking a stone head from a sanctuary and setting it up on the hill during the Lughnasadh harvest festival. MacNeill writes, "The head looking in different directions may be ... looking propitiously on the ripening corn-plots".

Archaeologist Anne Ross suggests that such stone heads were "surrogate sacrificial heads". Celtic artefacts from ancient Gaul suggest that the human head was seen as a symbol of rebirth and fertility. For example, carvings from the Celtic oppidum of Entremont in southern Gaul suggest a symbolic link between harvesting crops and headhunting.

Folklorist Dáithí Ó hÓgáin suggests that the three faces on the Corleck Head and similar heads represent an all-knowing and all-seeing god, or that they symbolise the unity of the past, present and future. According to the archaeologist Miranda Aldhouse-Green, the Corleck Head may have been used as a "seeing stone" to "gain knowledge of places or events far away in time and space".

== Sources ==
- Aldhouse-Green, Miranda. The Celtic Myths: A Guide to the Ancient Gods and Legends. London: Thames and Hudson, 2015. ISBN 978-0-5002-5209-3
- Armit, Ian. Headhunting and the Body in Iron Age Europe. Cambridge University Press, 2012. ISBN 978-0-5218-7756-5
- Barron, Thomas J. "Some Beehive Quernstones from Counties Cavan and Monaghan". Clogher Record, volume 9, number 1, 1976. JSTOR 27695733 ISSN 0412-8079
- Cooney, Gabriel. Death in Irish Prehistory. Dublin: Royal Irish Academy, 2023. ISBN 978-1-8020-5009-7
- Davidson, Hilda Ellis. "Myths and Symbols in Religion and Folklore". Folklore, volume 100, number 2, 1989. pp. 131–142. JSTOR 1260292 ISSN 0015-587X
- Duffy, Patrick. "Reviewed Work: Landholding, Society and Settlement In Ireland: a historical geographer's perspective by T. Jones Hughes". Clogher Record, volume 21, number 1, 2012. pp. 150–153 JSTOR 41917586 ISSN 0412-8079
- Eogan, George; Herity, Michael. Ireland in Prehistory. London: Routledge, 2013 (first published 1977). ISBN 978-0-4150-4889-7
- Gleeson, Patrick. "Reframing the First Millennium AD in Ireland: Archaeology, History, Landscape Archived 8 December 2023 at the Wayback Machine". Proceedings of the Royal Irish Academy, 2022. ISSN 0302-7597
- Kelly, Eamonn. "The Iron Age". In Ó Floinn, Raghnall; Wallace, Patrick (eds). Treasures of the National Museum of Ireland: Irish Antiquities. Dublin: National Museum of Ireland, 2002. ISBN 0-7171-2829-6
- Kelly, Eamonn. "The Archaeology of Ireland 3: The Pagan Celts". Ireland Today, no. 1006, 1984. ISSN 0332-0103
- Kelly, Eamonn. "Late Bronze Age and Iron Age Antiquities". In: Ryan, Micheal (ed). Treasures of Ireland: Irish Art 3000 BC – 1500 AD. Dublin: Royal Irish Academy, 1983. ISBN 0-9017-1428-3
- Koch, John. Celtic Culture: A Historical Encyclopedia. New York: ABC-CLIO, 2006. ISBN 1-8510-9440-7
- MacKillop, James. A Dictionary of Celtic Mythology. Oxford University Press, 2004. ISBN 0-1986-9157-2
- McMahon, Theo. "Reviewed Work(s): Gentleman and Scholar: Thomas James Barron, 1903–1992 by Jonathan A. Smyth". Clogher Record, volume 21, number 1, 2012. JSTOR 41917587 ISSN 0412-8079
- Morahan, Leo. "A Stone Head from Killeen, Belcarra, Co. Mayo". Journal of the Galway Archaeological and Historical Society, volume 41, 1987–1988. pp. 147–149. JSTOR 25535584 ISSN 0332-415X
- Newell, Adrian N. "Gallo-Roman Religious Sculpture". Greece & Rome, volume 3, number 8, February 1934. pp. 74–84. JSTOR 640758 ISSN 0017-3835
- Ó hÓgáin, Dáithí. "Patronage & Devotion in Ancient Irish Religion". History Ireland, volume 8, number 4, Winter 2000. pp. 20–24. JSTOR 27724824 ISSN 0791-8224
- Ó hÓgáin, Dáithí. The Sacred Isle: Belief and Religion in Pre-Christian Ireland. Suffolk: Boydell Press, 1999. ISBN 0-8511-5747-5
- Paterson, John Thomas Farquhar. "Carved Head from Cortynan, Co. Armagh". The Journal of the Royal Society of Antiquaries of Ireland, volume 92, number 1, 1962. JSTOR 25509461 ISSN 0035-9106
- "Proceedings". The Royal Society of Antiquaries of Ireland, volume 7, number 2, 31 December 1937. JSTOR 25513916 ISSN 0079-497X
- "Report of the Council for 1937". The Journal of the Royal Society of Antiquaries of Ireland, Seventh Series, volume 8, no. 1, 30 June 1938. JSTOR 25510127 ISSN 0035-9106
- Ross, Anne. The Pagan Celts. Ruthin: John Jones, 1998. ISBN 0-8973-3435-3
- Ross, Anne. Druids: Preachers of Immortality. Cheltenham: The History Press, 2005. ISBN 0-8973-3435-3
- Ross, Anne. Pagan Celtic Britain: Studies in Iconography and Tradition. Oxfordshire: Routledge, 1967. ISBN 0-8973-3435-3
- Ross, Anne. "The Human Head in Insular Pagan Celtic Religion Archived 4 December 2024 at the Wayback Machine". Proceedings of the Society of Antiquaries of Scotland, volume 91, 1960. ISSN 2056-743X
- Rynne, Etienne. "Celtic Stone Idols in Ireland". In: Thomas, Charles. The Iron Age in the Irish Sea Province: Papers given at a C.B.A. Conference held at Cardiff, January 3 to 5, 1969 Archived 2 February 2023 at the Wayback Machine. London: Council for British Archaeology, 1972.
- Rynne, Etienne. "The Three Stone Heads at Woodlands, near Raphoe, Co. Donegal". The Journal of the Royal Society of Antiquaries of Ireland, volume 94, no. 2, 1964. JSTOR 25509564 ISSN 0035-9106
- Waddell, John. Pagan Ireland: Ritual and Belief in Another World. Dublin: Wordwell Books, 2023. ISBN 978-1-9167-4202-4
- Waddell, John. The Prehistoric Archaeology of Ireland Archived 31 July 2023 at the Wayback Machine. Galway University Press, 1998. ISBN 1-8698-5739-9
- Warner, Richard. "Two Pagan Idols – Remarkable New Discoveries". Archaeology Ireland, volume 17, no. 1, 2003. ISSN 0790-892X
- Welsh, Harry. The Prehistoric Artefacts of Northern Ireland. London: Archaeopress, 2022. ISBN 978-1-7896-9953-1
- Zachrisson, Torun. "The Enigmatic Stone Faces: Cult Images from the Iron Age? Archived 22 March 2024 at the Wayback Machine". In Semple, Sarah; Orsini, Celia; Mui, Sian (eds). Life on the Edge: Social, Political and Religious Frontiers in Early Medieval Europe. Hanover: Hanover Museum, 2017. ISBN 978-3-9320-3077-2
