= List of Sites of Special Scientific Interest in Ceredigion =

Map of Ceredigion within Wales

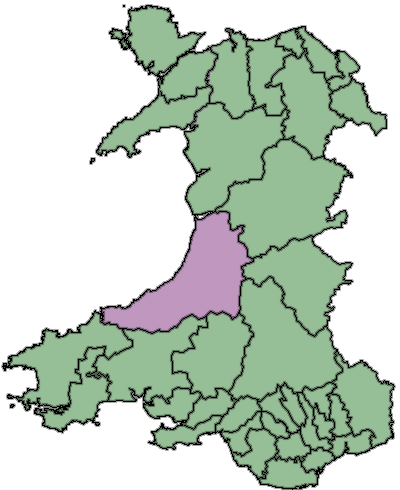
Ceredigion AOS

This is a list of the Sites of Special Scientific Interest (SSSIs) in the Ceredigion Area of Search (AOS).

== History ==
SSSIs in the UK are notified using the concept of an Area of Search, an area of between 400 km^{2} (150 sq mi) and 4,000 km^{2} (1,500 sq mi) in size. The Areas of Search were conceived and developed between 1975 and 1979 by the Nature Conservancy Council (NCC), based on regions created by the Local Government Act 1972. Whereas England had its Areas of Search based on 46 counties, those in Wales were based on a combination of the counties and smaller districts. In 1974, Wales was divided into 8 counties, with 37 districts. The NCC created 12 Welsh Areas of Search; they mostly follow county borders, but the larger counties (Dyfed, Powys and Gwynedd) were divided into multiple Areas using district borders. Mid and South Glamorgan were merged into a single AOS, whilst Llanelli district was included in the West Glamorgan AOS.

Due to subsequent local government reorganisation in the UK since 1972, many counties and districts have been divided, merged or renamed. Using the AOS system alone would make it difficult to search for individual SSSI citations via the Countryside Council for Wales (CCW) database without knowing 1972 region divisions. As a result, the CCW groups Welsh SSSIs using the subdivisions of Wales formed in April 1996 by the Local Government (Wales) Act 1994, resulting in 22 principal areas.

Ceredigion AOS lies within the county of Ceredigion.

For SSSIs elsewhere in the UK, see List of SSSIs by Area of Search.

== Sites ==
- Aberarth - Carreg Wylan
- Afon Rheidol ger Capel Bangor
- Afon Teifi
- Allt Wen a Traeth Tanybwlch
- Banc Llety-spence
- Banc y Mwldan
- Banc-y-Warren
- Borth - Clarach
- Bron Aberanerch
- Bryn Bras
- Cae Ffos-yr-odyn
- Cae Ty-hen
- Caeau Ardwyn
- Caeau Crug Bychan, Ty Gwyn a Llwyn Ysgaw
- Caeau Llety-cybi
- Cae'r Meirch
- Chwarel Ponterwyd (Ponterwyd Quarry)
- Coed a Gweunydd Gilfach-gwyddil
- Coed Allt Craig Arth
- Coed Allt Lan-las
- Coed Cwm Cletwr
- Coed Cwm Einion
- Coed Mynachlog-fawr
- Coed Nant Llolwyn
- Coed Tyddyn-du
- Coed y Crychydd
- Coedydd a Cheunant Rheidol (Rheidol Woods & Gorge)
- Coedydd a Chorsydd Aber Teifi (Teifi Estuary Woodlands & Marshes)
- Comin Esgairmaen
- Comin Silian
- Comins Capel Betws
- Cors Bwlch-y-baedd
- Cors Caranod
- Cors Caron
- Cors Gorsgoch
- Cors Llyn Farch a Llyn Fanod
- Cors Nantcwnlle
- Cors Penbwlch
- Cors y Sychnant
- Craigyfulfran & Clarach
- Craig-y-pistyll
- Creigiau Aberarth-Morfa
- Creigiau Cwm-Ceriw a Ffos-las (Morfa Bychan)
- Creigiau Pen y graig
- Cwm Doethie - Mynydd Mallaen
- Cwm Llyfnant
- Cwmsymlog
- Dolau Hafod a Winllan
- Dyfi
- Elenydd
- Ffordd Coed Dol-Fawr
- Figyn Blaen-Brefi
- Glanfedw
- Glanrhocca
- Gro Ty'n yr Helyg
- Gro Ystwyth
- Gwaun Garthenor a Llanio-Isaf
- Gwaun Pen-lan
- Gwaun Troed-rhiw-seiri a Llyn Mynydd-gorddu
- Gwaun Ystrad Caron
- Gweunydd Pendinas
- Hen Berth Fron-Badarn a Phersondy
- Llyn Eiddwen
- Llynoedd Ieuan
- Mwyngloddfa Brynyrafr
- Mwyngloddfa Castell
- Mwyngloddfa Cwmbrwyno
- Mwyngloddfa Cwmystwyth
- Mwyngloddfa Darren
- Mwyngloddfa Erglodd
- Mwyngloddfa Frongoch
- Mwyngloddfa Llechweddhelyg
- Mwyngloddfa Llety Ifan Hen (Vaughan Mine)
- Mwyngloddfa Nant-y-cagl (Eaglebrook Mine)
- Nant Cledlyn Pingos
- Old Cilgwyn and Cae Heslop
- Parc Pont-faen
- Parc-y-rhos
- Pencarreg-gopa a Moel Hyrddod
- Pencreigiau'r Llan
- Pumlumon (Plynlimon)
- Rheidol Shingles and Backwaters
- Rhos Blaen Carrog
- Rhos Blaenclettwr
- Rhos Bron-yr-helem
- Rhos Bryn Hir
- Rhos Bryn-wichell
- Rhos Bwlch-y-rhandir
- Rhos Cilcennin
- Rhos Cross Inn
- Rhos Cwmsaeson
- Rhos Esgairwen-fawr a Rhosgoch-fawr
- Rhos Fullbrook
- Rhos Gargoed
- Rhos Gellie
- Rhos Glwydwern
- Rhos Glyn-yr-helyg
- Rhos Llawr Cwrt
- Rhos Pil-bach a Pennar-fawr
- Rhos Talglas a Chors yr Hafod
- Rhos-Rydd
- River Ithon
- Traeth Llanon
