= Edward Prosser Rhys =

Welsh poet, writer and publisher (1901–1945)

- Born: 4 March 1901; Trefenter, Wales
- Died: 6 February 1945 (aged 43); Aberystwyth, Wales
- Occupations: journalist, poet and publisher
- Spouse: Mary Prudence Rhys (1928–1945)
- Writing career
- Literary movement: Welsh language poetry

Edward Prosser Rhys (4 March 1901 – 6 February 1945), often known simply as Prosser Rhys, was a Welsh journalist, poet and publisher.

In his early life he was diagnosed with tuberculosis which would affect him throughout his life. Before going into publishing he worked as a clerk at the Western Ocean Colliery in Nant-y-moel, Ogmore Valley. He later moved to Aberystwyth where he married Mary Prudence Rhys (née Hughes) in 1928, where they then lived for the rest of his life.

His poem "Atgof" ('Memory') won the Crown at the National Eisteddfod in Pontypool in 1924, although it was controversial due to its homosexual content. The poem is extensively about sex, most often heterosexual but there is a short section about a gay experience. It has been speculated that it could be about Morris T. Williams, a close male acquaintance of Prosser Rhys who at the time was married to Kate Roberts.

He formed the publisher Gwasg Aberystwyth in 1928. He also founded The Welsh Books Club in 1937, following a canvas for public interest in subscriptions of Welsh literature, where the reader would receive 4 books a year for the cost of half a crown.

He was also editor of Baner ac Amserau Cymru (Banner and Welsh Times) 1923–1945.

On Mynydd Bach there is a monument to Prosser Rhys and three other notable poets from local villages who competed at the National Eisteddfod: T. Hughes Jones (1895–1966), B. T. Hopkins (1897–1981) and J. M. Edwards (1903–1978). It is located just south of Trefenter near Llyn Eiddwen. His grave also has an epitaph quote written by T. Gwynn Jones.

Prosser Rhys' archives of personal papers are held at the National Library of Wales.
