= Corleck Hill =

Drumlin in County Cavan, Ireland

- Location within Ireland
- Coordinates: 53°58′21″N 6°59′51″W
- Country: Ireland
- Province: Ulster
- County: County Cavan

Corleck Hill is a low hill or drumlin in the townland of Corleck, County Cavan, Ireland. The hill was a site for Lughnasadh gatherings, a Gaelic harvest festival which continued to be celebrated until the early modern period.

An ancient passage tomb and stone circle on Corleck were dismantled by a farmer in the mid-19th century. At the same time, two the c. 1st-century AD Celtic stone idols, the Corleck Head and Corraghy Heads (collectively known as the "Corleck Gods"), were unearthed there or nearby. There is also said to have been an early medieval sacred well.

== Etymology ==
Corleck comes from Irish: Corr Leice, meaning 'rounded hill of the flagstone'. Drumeague is derived from Irish: Droim Éag, meaning 'ridge of death' or 'ridge of the deaths'.

According to the local folklorist and historian Thomas J. Barron, an Irish mythological name for this hilly region of East Cavan was Sliabh na Trí nDée (the "highland of the three gods") or Sliabh na nDée Dána ("highland of the three gods of craftmanship"). Barron discusses the name in relation to the three-faced Corleck Head. Later, American Celticist James MacKillop has it as a name for Corleck Hill itself. MacKillop believes that the three gods referred to in the placename were the Dagda, Conn, (Note: The son of Ler from the legend of the Children of Lir.) and Ogma. He says that they were earlier believed to refer to the three Sons of Tuireann: Brian, Iuchar and Iucharba.

== Archaeology ==
Human activity on Corleck Hill dates to the Neolithic period. There was a c. 2500 BC passage tomb and a stone circle on the hill, which were dismantled in the 19th century for farming. Barron was told by an older local man that there had been a mound or cairn with a stone passage and central chamber, surrounded by a stone circle. He had referred to it as a cealltrach or ancient burial site. In the 1830s, farmer James Longmore removed the flagstones to build a farmhouse. In 1860, stones were removed from the cairn to build another house. In 1900, the landowner levelled the remaining mound along with its "ancient thorn and rowan trees".

Corleck Hill is best known for its association with the Corleck Head, an Iron Age carved stone head with three faces. It was found in Drumeague townland, near Corleck Hill, around 1855 by farmer James Longmore Jr. while searching for building stones on his farmland. There is a ruined wedge tomb in Drumeague. Two other carved heads, the Corraghy Heads, were found nearby at around the same time. It is believed they represent Celtic pagan gods and were part of a shrine on Corleck Hill or in Drumeague. There was also a stone head found in the area representing Saint Brigid, but this is now lost.

The area seems to have been an important pagan cult centre during the Iron Age, likely associated with the druids. It is one of six regions in Ulster where groups of seemingly related Iron Age Celtic stone idols have been found. Other ancient objects from the broader area include the 1st century BC wooden Ralaghan Idol, (Note: The townland of Ralaghan is about 7 km (4.3 mi) south-east of Corleck Hill.) and a small contemporary spherical stone head from the nearby townland of Corravilla.

Until the 19th century, there were gatherings at Corleck Hill during Lughnasadh, a harvest festival of ancient origin named after the Celtic god Lugh, a warrior king and master craftsman of the Tuatha Dé Danann. Folklorist Máire MacNeill highlights legends about severed heads associated with Lughnasadh, and suggests that the Corleck Head had been set up on the hill for the duration of the festival in pre-history.
