= Thomas J. Barron =

Irish folklorist and amateur historian

- Born: 13 November 1903; Knockbride, County Cavan
- Died: 5 March 1992 (aged 88)
- Occupations: Education; Folklore; Archaeology; historian

Thomas J. Barron (13 November 1903 – 5 March 1992), known as Tom, was an Irish folklorist and amateur historian. A primary school teacher by profession, Barron became respected through extensive local field research, conservation efforts, and his regular contributions to the Irish Folklore Commission, with articles largely gathering and detailing the folklore of the East Cavan area.

He is best known for bringing a number of pre-historical Irish objects to national attention, including a late Neolithic gold lunula, objects excavated from late Bronze Age crannogs, and the Iron Age Corleck and Corraghy stone idol heads. According to the writer and archeologist Anne Ross, Barron was the first to associate the cultic stone heads with calendar festivals, specifically the Lughnasadh harvest festival.

== Life and career ==
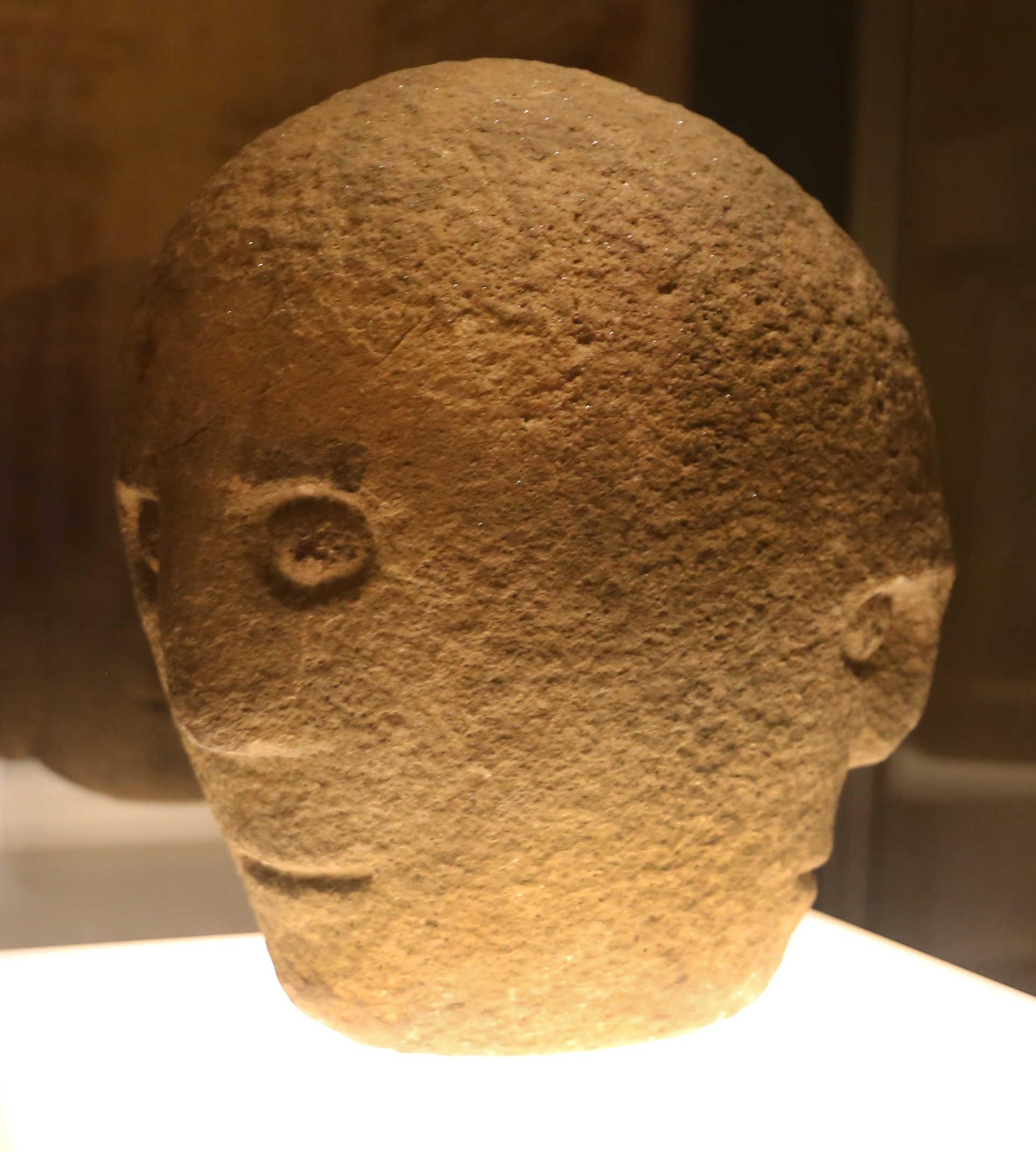
The three-faced Corleck Head, 1st or 2nd century AD. National Museum of Ireland

Thomas Barron was born on 13 November 1903 to John James and Margaret (née White) Barron, and had two brothers and a sister. He was raised in Knockbride, County Cavan, and spent all his life in the county. The Barron family descended from Scottish Covenanters who settled in County Armagh, before moving to Cavan c. 1760. Barron started work as an assistant teacher in the early 1930s, before attaining a permanent position at Knockbride National School in 1935. He became principal of Bailieborough National School in 1950. He married Sarah Elizabeth Mahood Canningstown (also a teacher) in August 1944. Throughout his life he was a respected educator, and in 1990, he was asked to advise on a proposed cross-community curriculum in Northern Ireland.

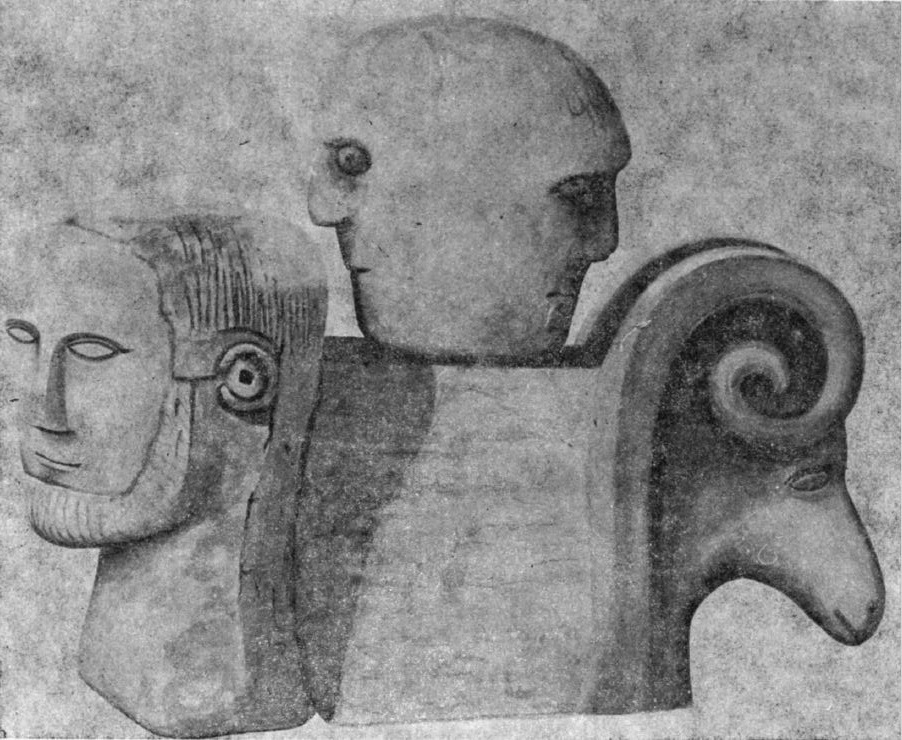
19th century drawing of the Corraghy Heads made before they were dismantled. The Corraghy Heads are to the left and right; the Corleck Head is centre.

In 1934 Barron was the first to recognise the age and significance of the three-faced Corleck Head, which had been found in 1855 by a local farmer. He established its modern providence through interviews with locals who had early memories of viewing the head in different locations in the area. Barron contacted National Museum of Ireland in 1937 after which the museum's director Adolf Mahr arranged its permanent loan to the museum for study. In a lecture to The Prehistoric Society that year, Mahr described the head as "certainly the most Gaulish looking sculpture of religious character ever found in Ireland". Mahr secured funding to acquire it into the museum's collection, while study of the head and similar stone idols preoccupied Barron until his death.

He became a regular contributor to the Irish Folklore Commission almost from his foundation in 1935. He excavated crannogs on Knockbride lake from the early 1950s, and found a number of quern-stones, as well as a cannonball dated to the Irish Rebellion of 1641. He was praised in a 1942 article in the Ulster Journal of Archaeology where it was noted that he had "during the past ten years acquired [for the National Museum of Ireland] a great number of objects of archaeological significance from East Cavan.

Barron died on 5 March 1992 from bone marrow cancer at Our Lady's Hospital, Navan in County Meath.

== Selected publications ==
- "Stone head, Clannaphilip Church, Co. Cavan", Journal of the Royal Society of Antiquaries of Ireland, 1941. JSTOR 25510304
- "The prehistory of the Breifne region", Journal of Cumann Seanchais Bhreifne, 1958}
- "Stone Axehead from County Cavan", Journal of Cumann Seanchais Bhreifne, 1961
- "A 1798 Pikehead from Bailieborough", Journal of Cumann Seanchais Bhreifne, 1966
- "Stair Nuadat Find Fenim, and Sliabh nDee, alias Sliabh na Trí nDee, alias Sliabh Guaire", Journal of Cumann Seanchais Bhreifne, 1967
- "A Poitin Affray near Ballybay in 1797", Clogher Record, volume 8, nr 2, 1974. JSTOR 27695697
- "The Clones Stone Shrine", Clogher Record, volume. 8, nr 3, 1975. JSTOR 27695720
- "Some Beehive Quernstones from Counties Cavan and Monaghan", Clogher Record, volume 9, No. 1, 1976. JSTOR 27695733

== Sources ==
- Barron, Thomas J. "Some Beehive Quernstones from Counties Cavan and Monaghan". Clogher Record, volume 9, No. 1, 1976. JSTOR 27695733
- Duffy, Patrick. "Reviewed Work: Landholding, Society and Settlement In Ireland: a historical geographer's perspective by T. Jones Hughes". Clogher Record, volume 21, no. 1, 2012. JSTOR 41917586
- Ross, Anne. The Pagan Celts. Denbighshire: John Jones, 1998. ISBN 978-1-8710-8361-3
- Ross, Anne. Druids: Preachers of Immortality. Cheltenham: The History Press, 2010. ISBN 978-0-7524-1433-1
- Smyth, Jonathan. Gentleman and Scholar: Thomas James Barron, 1903 - 1992. Cumann Seanchais Bhreifne, 2012. ISBN 978-0-9534-9937-3
