= Mynydd Bach (hills) =

Mountains in Ceredigion, Wales

Coordinates: 52.279°N 4.037°W

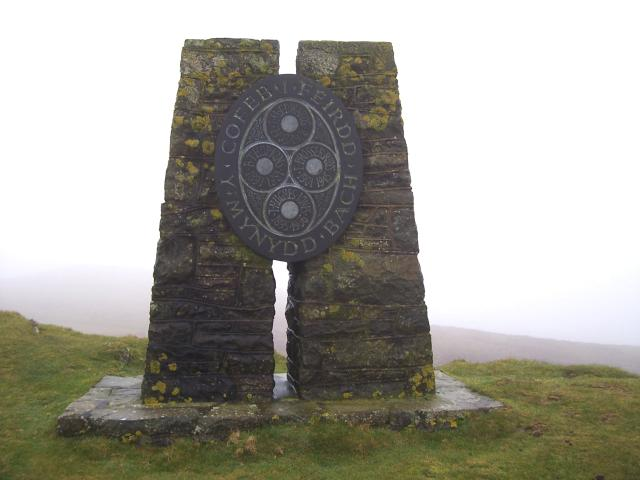
A monument in the hilsls commemorating local poets.

Mynydd Bach (Welsh for 'small mountain') is located in the midlands of Ceredigion. It is a range of low hills, rather than a single mountain as its name suggests. The highest point reaches 329 meters above sea level. This area contains a few small villages and is an important place in Ceredigion’s cultural history.

== Geography ==
Mynydd Bach lies between Cors Caron (also known as the Tregaron Bog) to the east and the Cardigan Bay coastline to the west. Llyn Eiddwen is located on its western slope and is preserved as a Site of Special Scientific Interest (SSI). The mountain is crossed by a country lane that passes near Llyn Eiddwen, through Bontnewydd and connects Trefenter and Blaenpennal.

Villages on Mynydd Bach include:

- Bethania
- Blaenpennal
- Bontnewydd
- Bronant
- Llangwyryfon
- Lledrod
- Penuwch
- Trefenter

== History and Culture ==
The mountain is connected to four notable poets from local villages who competed at the National Eisteddfod. They include: T. Hughes Jones (1895-1966), B. T. Hopkins (1897-1981), J. M. Edwards (1903-1978) and Edward Prosser Rhys (1901-1945). A stone memorial to these four sits just south of Trefenter near Llyn Eiddwen.
