= Bontnewydd =

Bontnewydd may refer to the following places in Wales:

- Bontnewydd, Ceredigion, a village
- Bontnewydd, Denbighshire, a hamlet
- Bontnewydd, Gwynedd, a village
