= Coed Cwm Clettwr =

Protected area in Ceredigion, Wales

Coed Cwm Cletwr
- Site of Special Scientific Interest
- Location within Wales
- Location of Coed Cwm Cletwr.
- Area of search: Ceredigion
- Grid reference: SN6646591867
- Coordinates: 52.508293°N 3.9689747°W
- Interest: Biological
- Area: 22.98 ha (56.8 acres)
- Notification date: 1 January 1979

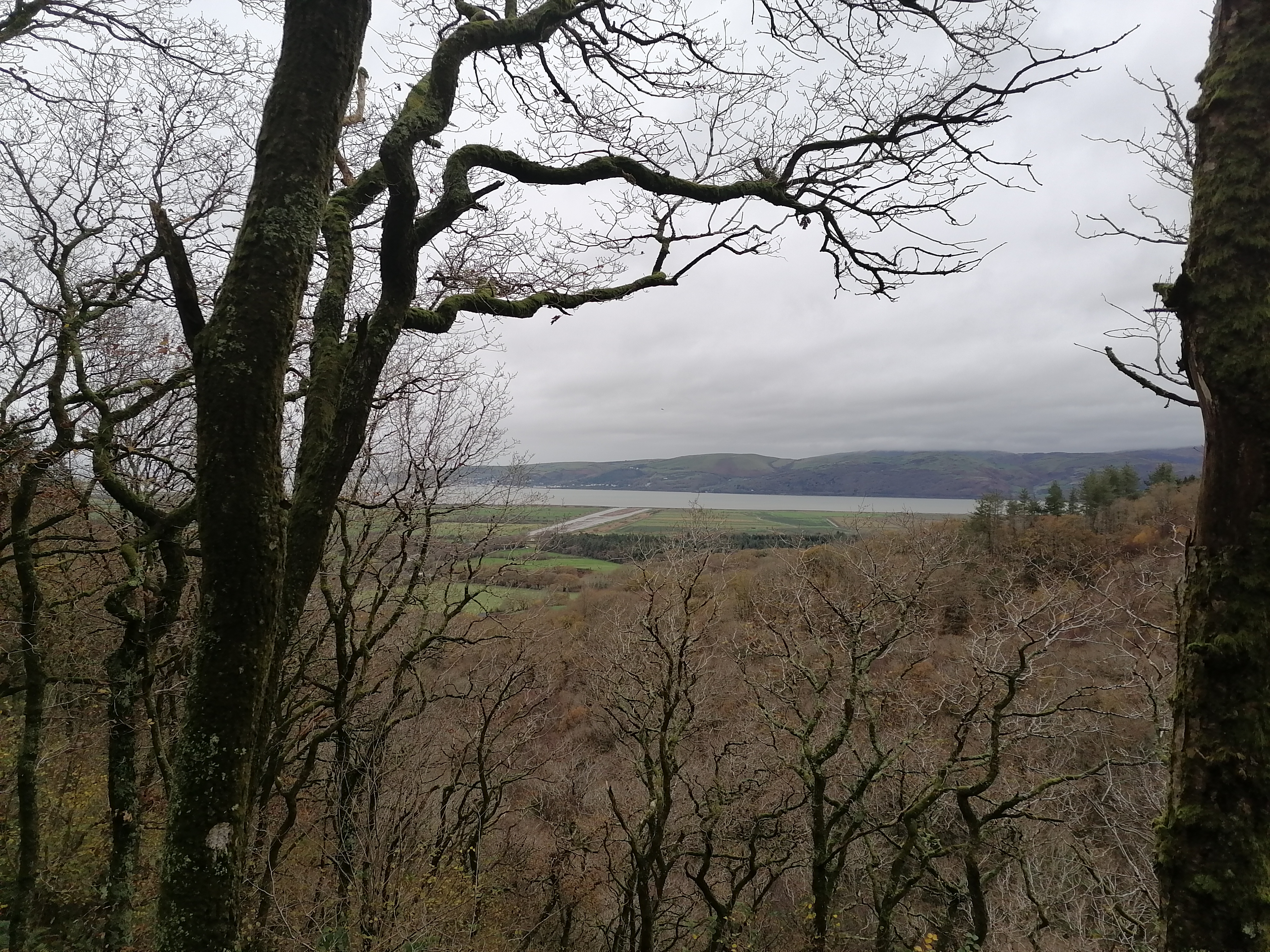
Coed Cwm Cletwr

Coed Cwm Clettwr is a Site of Special Scientific Interest in Ceredigion, west Wales. It is designated for mature broadleaf woodland.

The alternative spelling Coed Cwm Cletwr appears on a variety of maps over many years, but local usage has Clettwr

== See also ==
- List of Sites of Special Scientific Interest in Ceredigion
