= Rhos Blaen Carrog =

Protected area in Ceredigion, Wales

- Site of Special Scientific Interest
- Location within Wales
- Location of Rhos Blaen Carrog.
- Area of search: Ceredigion
- Grid reference: SN5759272518
- Coordinates: 52.332214°N 4.0913744°W
- Interest: Biological
- Area: 1.73 ha (4.3 acres)
- Notification date: 29 December 1982

Rhos Blaen Carrog is a Site of Special Scientific Interest in Ceredigion, west Wales, due to its population of Wavy St. John's Wort (Hypericum undulatum), an extremely rare variety of St. John's Wort.

== See also ==
- List of Sites of Special Scientific Interest in Ceredigion
