= B. T. Hopkins =

Welsh poet (1897–1981)

Benjamin Thomas Hopkins (3 December 1897 – 21 January 1981) was a Welsh poet from Ceredigion (Cardiganshire) who wrote under the pen name "B. T. Hopkins". He was a noteworthy judge of the National Eisteddfod.

He was born near Lledrod and raised by his aunt in Blaenafon, since his mother died shortly after his birth. He married in 1937 and farmed Brynwichell in Blaenpennal parish near Mynydd Bach until his retirement in 1964. He was part of the literary circle that included Jenkin Morgan Edwards and Edward Prosser Rhys.

He is mostly known for his cywydd "Rhos Helyg" ("Moor Willows"), which extols the agrarian life and Welsh culture of his region. There is a memorial to him and the other three poets of Mynydd Bach near Llyn Eiddwen.

== Publications ==
- Rhos Helyg a cherddi eraill (1977)
