= Coed y Crychydd =

Protected area in Ceredigion, Wales

- Site of Special Scientific Interest
- Location within Wales
- Location of Coed y Crychydd.
- Area of search: Ceredigion
- Grid reference: SN6397674293
- Coordinates: 52.349783°N 3.9984666°W
- Interest: Biological
- Area: 9.74 ha (24.1 acres)
- Notification date: 1 January 1979

Coed y Crychydd is a Site of Special Scientific Interest in Ceredigion, west Wales. It is a moderately steep, north facing wood, featuring mainly ancient semi-natural woodland overlooking the Ystwyth Valley, managed by the Woodland Trust since 1980. The site support a variety of birds, including red kite, buzzard, raven and heron.

== See also ==
- List of Sites of Special Scientific Interest in Ceredigion
