= Craig-y-pistyll =

Protected area in Ceredigion, Wales

- Site of Special Scientific Interest
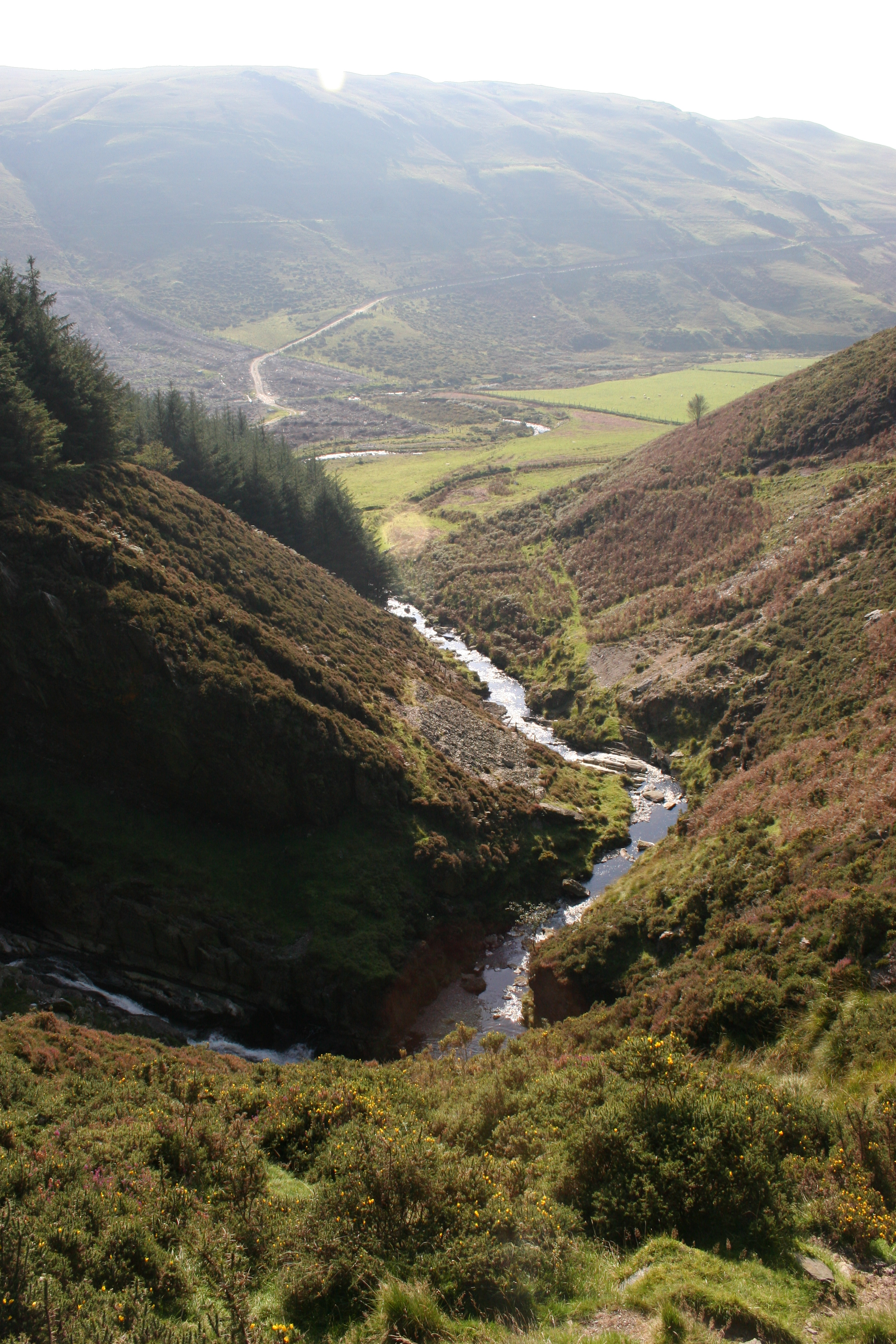
- The view down Craig y Pistyll

- Location within Wales
- Location of Craig-y-pistyll.
- Area of search: Wales
- Grid reference: SN7135285633
- Coordinates: 52.453456°N 3.894603°W
- Interest: Biological
- Area: 14.93 ha (36.9 acres)
- Notification date: 1 January 1979

Craig-y-pistyll is a Site of Special Scientific Interest in Ceredigion, west Wales. It is a reservoir with a dam at one end which supplies water to the Aberystwyth area.

== See also ==
- List of Sites of Special Scientific Interest in Ceredigion
