= Mwyngloddfa Castell =

Protected area in Ceredigion, Wales

Mwyngloddfa Castell is a Site of Special Scientific Interest in Ceredigion, west Wales. The two special features are metal tolerant (Metallophyte) Lichens and mineral veins exposed in mines and tunnels.

== See also ==
- List of Sites of Special Scientific Interest in Ceredigion
