= Stephen King (Gaelic footballer) =

Cavan Gaelic footballer

Personal information
- Born: County Cavan, Ireland

Sport
- Sport: Gaelic football
- Position: Midfield
Club
- Years: Club
- Killeshandra
Inter-county
Years	County	Apps (scores)
1981–1997	Cavan	71 (7-33)
Inter-county titles
- Ulster titles: 1

Stephen King is a former Gaelic footballer who played for the Cavan county team.

== Playing career ==
He debuted for Cavan in 1980, but did not have much success in the early years, winning only a Railway Cup Medal with Ulster in 1984. In 1989, Cavan had a great run in the National Football League, claiming the Div. 2 title and reaching the semi-final, only to lose narrowly to Dublin in Croke Park. In the same year he won a Dr. McKenna Cup medal when Cavan defeated Derry in the Final. He was a member of the Cavan squad that lost out in the Ulster Finals in 1983 and 1995, but in 1997, King captained Cavan to claim their only Ulster Senior Football Championship title in 28 years, beating Derry in Clones.

== International rules ==
He played for Ireland in the 1987 International Rules series against Australia.
