= Aberarth – Carreg Wylan =

Protected area in Ceredigion, Wales

Coordinates: 52°4′.6283″N 4°46′.0199″W

Aberarth – Carreg Wylan is a Site of Special Scientific Interest in Ceredigion, west Wales. It is a small coastal marine protected area with a reported marine area of 3.57 km^{2} (1.38 mi^{2}) and reported total area of 9.89 km^{2} (3.82 mi^{2}), which was designated in 1982 to conserve biodiversity, natural heritage, habitats, species or landscapes with legal protection, and to maintain key ecological functions. The management authority is the Countryside Council for Wales.

The habitats listed for protection include reefs, shallow submerged sandbanks, and submerged or partly submerged sea caves. The human activities within the site include water sports such as swimming, surfing or windsurfing, kayaking or canoeing, scuba diving, walking, sailing, anchoring, grazing of domestic animals on salt pastures and scientific research.

Marine species with protection status which are known from the site include the Eurasian otter (Lutra lutra), grey seal (Halichoerus grypus), common bottlenose dolphin (Tursiops truncatus) and harbour porpoise (Phocoena phocoena).

Several extractive and non-extractive activities are regulated, and bivalve dredging is prohibited.

== See also ==
- List of Sites of Special Scientific Interest in Ceredigion
