= Knockbride =

Parish in County Cavan, Ireland

Coordinates: 53.974°N 7.025°W

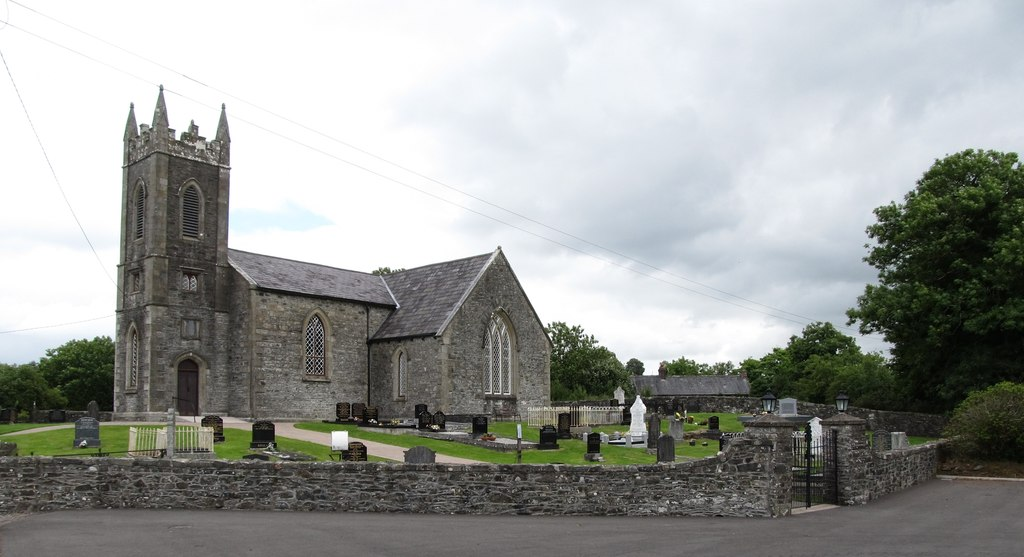
Knockbride Church of Ireland church

Knockbride (Irish: Cnoca Bríde, meaning 'hill of Bríd') is a civil parish in County Cavan, Ireland. It is located to the north of the town of Bailieborough.

There are two Roman Catholic churches in the parish – both are dedicated to Saint Brigid (Bríd) and located in the Diocese of Kilmore. The local Church of Ireland church was built in 1825. There is also a Presbyterian church, built in 1791, in Corraneary townland.

The village of Canningstown is within Knockbride civil parish, and the local Gaelic Athletic Association club is based at St. Brigid's Park outside the village.

There are 67 townlands in Knockbride civil parish, varying in size from c. 0.12 to 0.22 square miles (Druminnick and Fartagh townlands) to 1.09 square miles in area (Skeagh townland).

== Notable people ==
- Sir Edward Lucas (1857–1950), poet and politician who was born in Gallon Etra townland in Knockbride.
- Thomas J. Barron (1903–1992), historian and folklorist
- Chris Noth (b. 1954), American actor from Wisconsin, has ancestors who emigrated from the Knockbride area in the 19th century.
- Larry Reilly, (b. 1977/1978), former Cavan Gaelic footballer and Cavan U20 coach
- Niamh Smyth (b. 1978), Fianna Fáil TD for the Cavan–Monaghan constituency. She was raised in Knockbride, where her father was from, but has spent most of her adult life living in nearby Bailieborough.
- John Tierney (b.1982), former Cavan Gaelic footballer
