= John Tierney (Gaelic footballer) =

Personal information
- Native name: Seán Ó Tiarnaigh (Irish)
- Born: August 22, 1982 (age 44) Cavan, Ireland
- Height: 6 ft 0 in (183 cm)

Sport
- Sport: Gaelic football
- Position: Half Forward
Clubs
- Years: Club
- Knockbride; Dublin Demons
Inter-county
Years	County	Apps (scores)
2001–2005	Cavan	22 (1–7 : 10pts)

John Tierney is a Gaelic footballer from Knockbride, Cavan.

== Playing career ==
=== Gaelic football ===
The Knockbride clubman represented DCU, as well as the Cavan county team at minor, U-21 and senior level in the Dr McKenna Cup, NFL and played left half forward in the Ulster Senior Football Championship final defeat to Tyrone in 2001.

=== Australian football ===
Tierney represented the Ireland national Australian rules football team, that won the 2011 Australian Football International Cup and 2010 European Championships in Australian Football. He also captained the Under-17 Ireland international rules football team on a tour to Australia.
