= Rhos Gellie =

Protected area in Ceredigion, Wales

Rhos Gellie is a Site of Special Scientific Interest (SSSI) in Ceredigion, west Wales. It has been designated since 1988 as an SSSI as it is a habitat for marsh fritillary butterflies and also has a unique combination of varied vegetation types.

== Geography ==
Rhos Gellie is a marshy grassland.

== See also ==
- List of Sites of Special Scientific Interest in Ceredigion
