= Rhos Bwlch-y-rhandir =

Protected area in Ceredigion, Wales

Rhos Bwlch-y-rhandir is a Site of Special Scientific Interest situated on Bwlch y Rhandir farm in Llangwyryfon, Ceredigion, west Wales. It is one of the most northern homes of the St John's Wort in the UK, which makes this farm one of the most valuable to flora specialists in Wales. This is a diverse environment full of rare and protected fauna and flora, and is grazed partly by a herd of breeding cattle.

== See also ==
- List of Sites of Special Scientific Interest in Ceredigion
