= Caeau Llety-cybi =

Protected area in Ceredigion, Wales

- Site of Special Scientific Interest
- Location within Wales
- Location of Caeau Llety-cybi.
- Area of search: Ceredigion
- Grid reference: SN6028853534
- Coordinates: 52.162344°N 4.0439788°W
- Interest: Biological
- Area: 3.3 ha (8.2 acres)
- Notification date: 29 December 1982

Caeau Llety-cybi is a Site of Special Scientific Interest in Ceredigion, west Wales. The lowland meadow site is managed by the Wildlife Trust of South & West Wales.

The reserve consists of four small herb-rich fields of neutral grassland showing some acidic characteristics. Sward species include sweet vernal grass, common bent, and Heath-grass with a wealth of flowers, such as Bird's-foot trefoil, Black knapweed, Burnet saxifrage, Cat's ear, Ivy-leaved bellflower, Pignut, Red clover, Tormentil, Betony and Greater butterfly orchid.

The site has waxcap fungi, probably encouraged by a lack of ploughing.

== See also ==
- List of Sites of Special Scientific Interest in Ceredigion
