= Cors Nantcwnlle =

Protected area in Ceredigion, Wales

- Site of Special Scientific Interest
- Location within Wales
- Location of Cors Nantcwnlle.
- Area of search: Ceredigion
- Grid reference: SN5748559988
- Coordinates: 52.219613°N 4.0876448°W
- Interest: Biological
- Area: 37.92 ha (93.7 acres)
- Notification date: 28 March 2000

Cors Nantcwnlle is a Site of Special Scientific Interest near Bwlchllan in Ceredigion, west Wales.

Until the early twentieth century the site was renowned for peat cutting. Now it is noted for its unique ecology, including rare sphagnums (peat mosses),

== See also ==
- List of Sites of Special Scientific Interest in Ceredigion
