= Rhos Fullbrook =

Protected area in Ceredigion, Wales

Coordinates: 52°14′49″N 3°57′12″W

Rhos Fullbrook is a Site of Special Scientific Interest in Ceredigion, west Wales. It is 2 hectares.

== See also ==
- List of Sites of Special Scientific Interest in Ceredigion
