= Banc y Mwldan =

Protected area in Ceredigion, Wales

Coordinates: 52.106°N 4.633°W

Banc y Mwldan is a Site of Special Scientific Interest in Ceredigion, west Wales.

== See also ==
- List of Sites of Special Scientific Interest in Ceredigion
