= Larry Reilly =

Cavan Gaelic footballer

Personal information
- Born: Knockbride, County Cavan, Ireland

Sport
- Sport: Gaelic football
- Position: Corner forward
Club
- Years: Club
- Knockbride
Inter-county
- Years: County
- Cavan
Inter-county titles
- Ulster titles: 1

Larry Reilly (born 1977 or 1978) is a former Gaelic footballer who played for the Cavan county team.

== Inter-county ==
In 1997, the Knockbride clubman helped Cavan by scoring two points to claim their only Ulster Senior Football Championship title in 28 years, beating Derry in Clones. His older brother Peter Reilly also played in the 1997 Ulster football final.

== International ==
He played for Ireland in the 2000 International Rules Series against Australia. He scored five points over the two test games.
