= Coed Cwm Einion =

Protected area in Ceredigion, Wales

Coordinates: 52°32′4″N 3°55′50″W

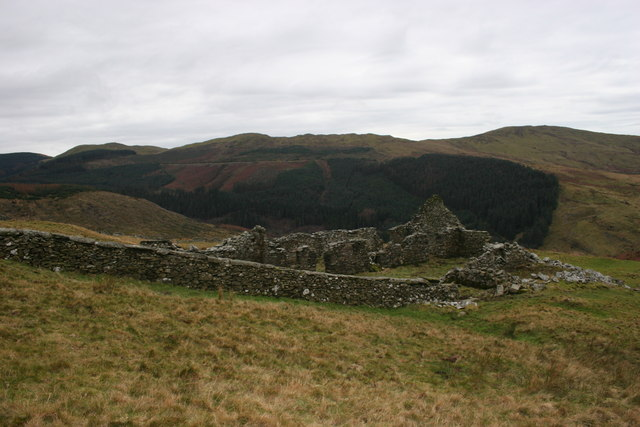
A ruined enclosure above Coed Cwm Einion

Coed Cwm Einion is a woodland to the east of the village of Furnace, in Ceredigion, west Wales. It is designated a Site of Special Scientific Interest, covering 20.92 hectares (51.7 acres). The Afon Einion river flows on the northern side of the Coed Cwm Einion woodland.

== Flora ==
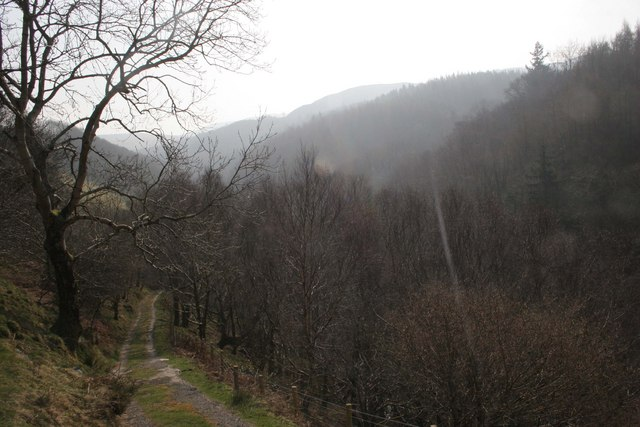
Coed Cwm Einion

The woodland extends up a steep gorge, and is approximately 69% broad-leaved deciduous woodland. A Tilio-Acerion ravine forest, it contains ash (Fraxinus excelsior) and sessile oak, rowan, downy birch trees and the small-leaved lime (Tilia cordata). Species found in the woodland include Tunbridge filmy-fern (Hymenophyllum tunbrigense), hay-scented buckler-fern (Dryopteris aemula), Plagiochila atlantica and Parmotrema robustum, a lichen which is critically endangered, and marsh hawk's-beard (Crepis paludosa). Numerous shrubs found in the wood include, ivy, honeysuckle, hazel and bramble and are a food source for birds and mammals such as dormice. Sheep grazing has affected the woodland, particularly on the northern side, and gaps in the canopy affect about 5-10% of the area of the woodland.

== Hiking route ==
There is a 5.6 miles (9.0 km) hiking route through the area, which passes through Coed Cerrig-mawr and ascends Mynydd Coronwen before descending sharply.

== See also ==
- List of Sites of Special Scientific Interest in Ceredigion
