= Mwyngloddfa Cwmystwyth =

Protected area in Ceredigion, Wales

- Site of Special Scientific Interest
- Location within Wales
- Location of Mwyngloddfa Cwmystwyth.
- Area of search: Ceredigion
- Grid reference: SN8031174578
- Coordinates: 52.356156°N 3.7588762°W
- Interest: Biological / Geology
- Area: 14.11 ha (34.9 acres)
- Notification date: 9 October 2000

Mwyngloddfa Cwmystwyth is a Site of Special Scientific Interest in Ceredigion, west Wales.

It comprises old mine workings located in the upper Ystwyth valley at Cwmystwyth. It is of special interest for its minerals and for the plant communities that have developed on the metal-rich spoil tips, associated rock outcrops and ruined buildings. These habitats support a great variety of lichens, including a number of rare species, which are typically only found associated with heavy-metal-rich sites.

The mine workings are also important for hibernating bats.

== See also ==
- List of Sites of Special Scientific Interest in Ceredigion
- Cwmystwyth Mines
