= Llynoedd Ieuan =

Protected area in Ceredigion, Wales

Llynoedd Ieuan is a Site of Special Scientific Interest in Ceredigion, Wales. The site is designated as a category IV by the International Union for Conservation of Nature on the IUCN Protected Area Management Categories scale.

== See also ==
- List of Sites of Special Scientific Interest in Ceredigion
