= Llyn Fanod =

Lake in Ceredigion, Wales

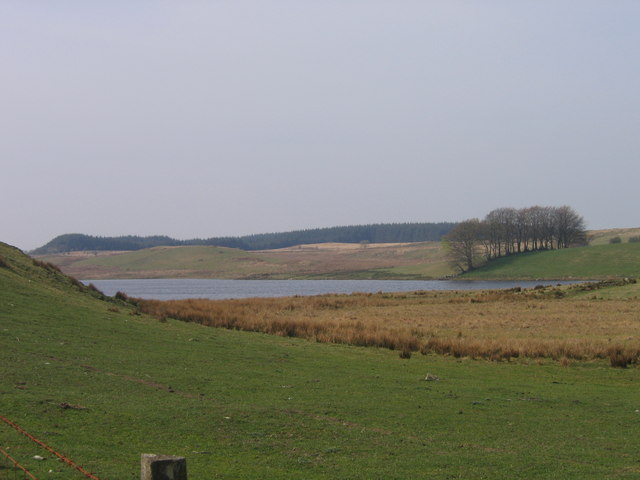
- Llyn Fanod in 2007 with a coniferous forest in the distance

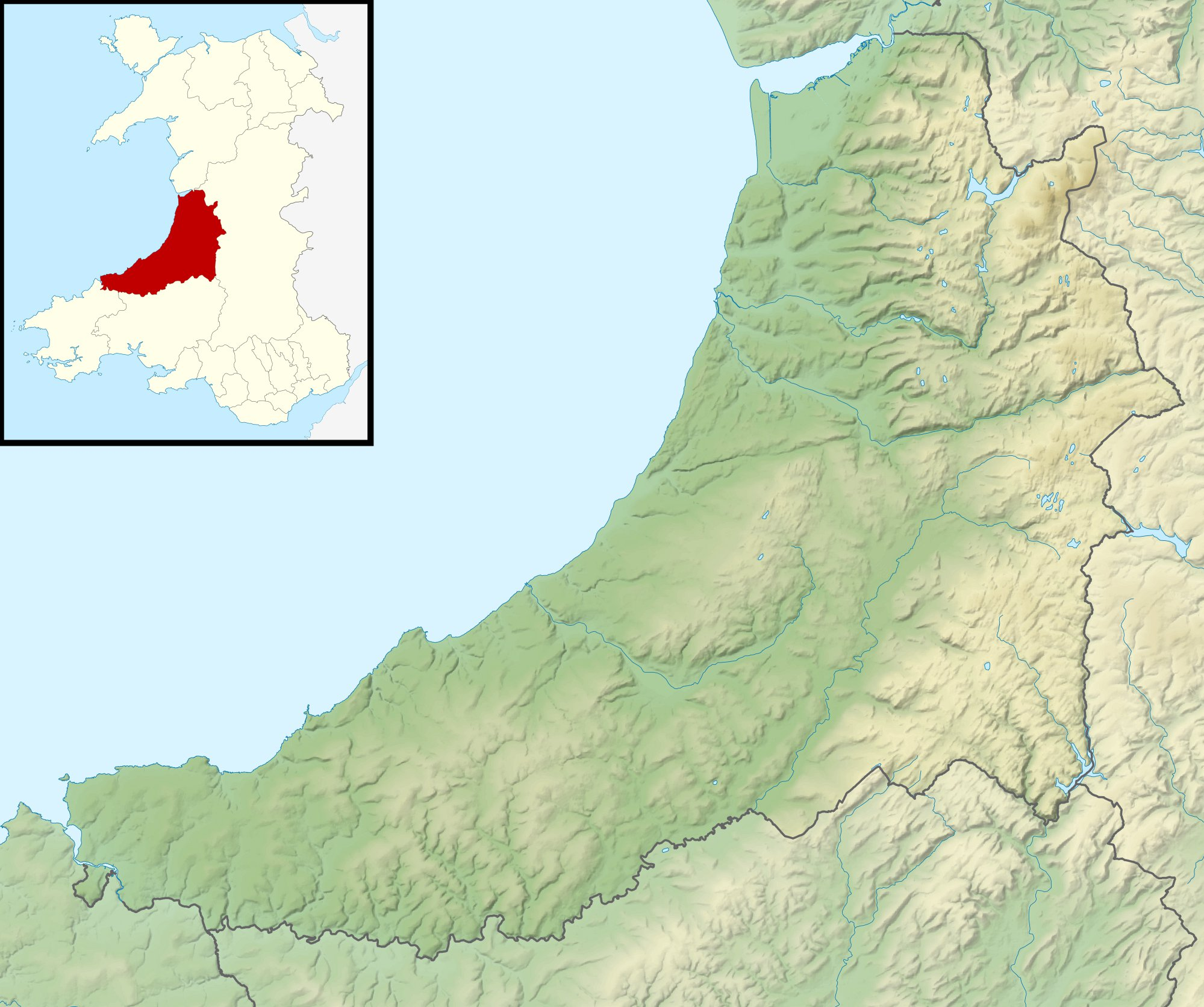
- Location within Ceredigion
- Location: Ceredigion, Wales
- Coordinates: 52°15′33″N 4°02′52″W
- Type: Mesotrophic
- Basin countries: United Kingdom
- Surface area: 5.3 ha (13 acres)
- Max. depth: 8.3 m (27 ft)

Llyn Fanod is an upland lake situated between Penuwch and Bontnewydd in Ceredigion, Wales. It is a Site of Special Scientific Interest, partly owned by the Wildlife Trust of South and West Wales. Public access is via a bridlepath from the road. It is a mesotrophic lake located in the headwaters of the River Aeron, whose low nutrient waters are home to a number of locally rare water plants. Waterfowl and passing sea birds can be seen on the lake as can dragonflies, damselflies, and caddis flies in the summer.

The lake has a surface area of 5.3 hectares (13 acres) and a maximum depth of 8.3 m (27 ft). It lies in a hollow probably scoured out glacially, and is dammed by a moraine. Palynological studies show that it has developed since the last ice age and is a remnant of a larger lake, Llyn Farch, which has otherwise dried up. It is surrounded by pasture grazed by cattle and sheep and at the southern end is a small peat mire. There are tussocks of purple moor-grass and tall cushions of common hair moss and Sphagnum recurvum. In the old peat cuttings, marsh cinquefoil, bog asphodel, bogbean, beaked sedge and Sphagnum species grow. In the open water at the southern end, yellow water lilies and European white water lilies float on the surface, and at the northern end can be found water lobelia, lake quillwort, Littorella uniflora and a few plants of water awlwort, all uncommon species in this area.

In the sometimes boggy rough grassland surrounding the lake are also common spike-rush, water horsetail, sharp-flowered rush and soft rush, marsh willowherb, marsh-bedstraw, floating sweet-grass, bogbean and lesser spearwort.
