= Corraghy Heads =

c. 1st century AD stone heads

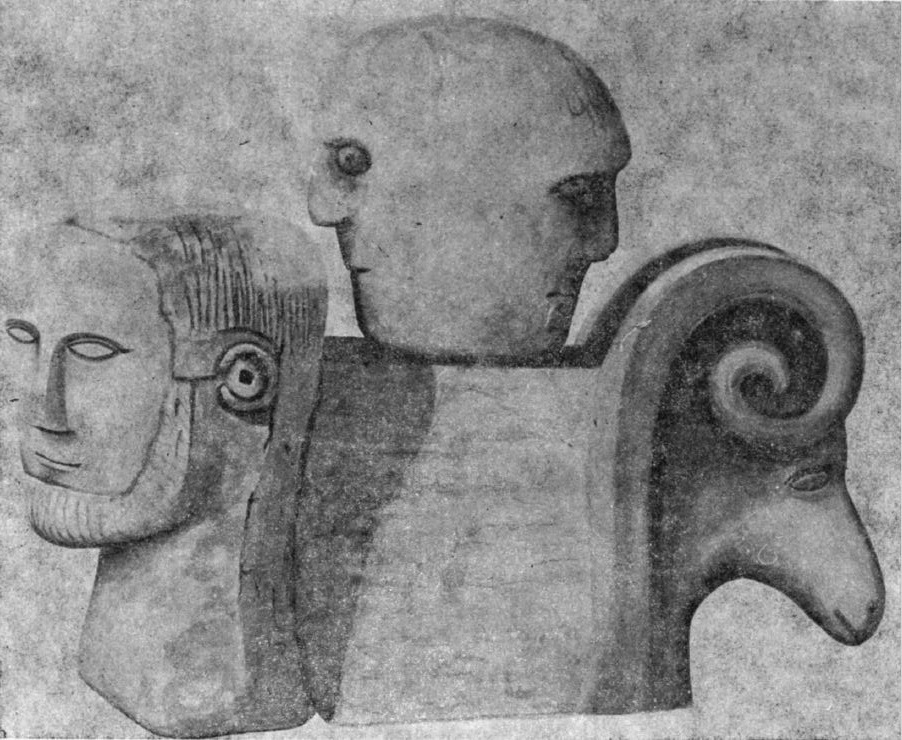
Speculative drawing of the heads. The Corraghy heads are to the left and right; the Corleck Head is above and centre.

The Corraghy Heads is the name given to two c. 1st century AD stone heads uncovered c. 1855 in the townland of Drumeague, County Cavan, Ireland. The sculpture was originally a two-headed or janus sculpture of a human and ram's head linked by a long cross-piece, but was broken apart in the mid-19th century. The ram's head was lost soon after; the human head survives and is now in the National Museum of Ireland, but is rarely displayed. This human head is unusually naturalistic for the time, having ears, well-defined hair strands, a beard and a large neck.

The same excavation unearthed the contemporary Corleck stone idol; they are sometimes collectively referred to as "the Corleck Gods". Based on their iconography, the two objects are usually dated to the late Iron Age, probably to the 1st or 2nd century AD. Archeologists believe that they once formed part of a larger shrine on Drumeague Hill that was associated with a Celtic head cult, and were later used during the Lughnasadh harvest festivals. This site, located on the Corleck Hill in the townland of Drumeague, is known in Irish as Sliabh na Trí nDée ("Hill of the Three Gods"), a name believed to preserve the memory of the multiple stone idols, including the Corraghy heads and Corleck head.

== Description ==
The human head is unusually well described, having very narrow and linear eyes, well-defined hair, a smiling mouth, beard, ears and an unnaturally wide and long neck. In contrast, most other insular stone idols typically are hairless, earless, and have rounded eyes and a bust cut off the top of the neck. However other rare examples have similar features, including several heads found in Yorkshire, and isolated heads discovered in Kilmanahin, County Kilkenny and in Cortynan, near Tynan, in County Armagh.

His wide and long neck is unnaturally out of proportion to his head and more reminiscent of a pedestal. The figure wears a beard and whisker, and has heavily emphasised eyelids; unique features but also seen in the assumed contemporary head found in Muirton, near Perth, Scotland and the janus figure found in Leichlingen, Germany.

== Discovery ==
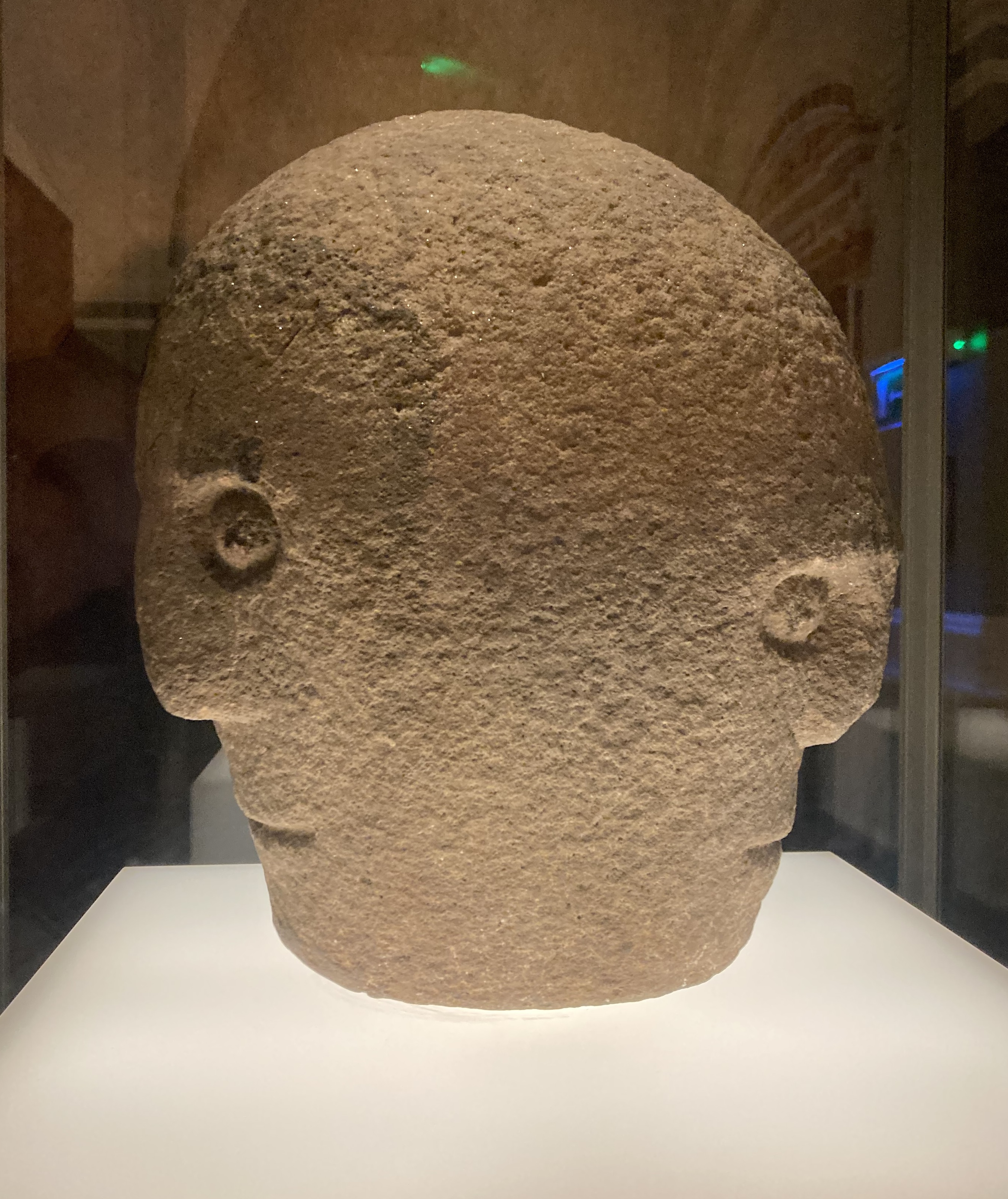
View of the Corleck Head, 1st century AD

The intact co-joined heads were uncovered by the local farmer James Longmore c. 1855 in the townland of Drumeague, County Cavan, during the excavation of a large c. 2500 BC passage tomb near Corleck hill. The sculpture was found buried alongside the Corleck Head, another janiform sculpture which is less complex but in its simplicity more artistically refined.

The head's age and significance were not understood until the 1940s, when they were seen by the local historian Thomas J. Barron, who recognised them as prehistoric. According to reports from locals, the Corraghy and Corleck heads were displayed together on a wall in front of a house, with the Corleck head placed on top of the Corraghy heads. The ram's head was destroyed after 1865 when the Longmores sold the lease on the farm to Thomas Hall. According to Hall, his sons accidentally smashed a significant portion of the sculpture while trying to separate the two heads.

The human head was thought lost until it was rediscovered by Barron in 1969, who found it embedded in the wall of a farmyard barn in the townland of Corraghy. It has been compared to the Killeen head, discovered in Belcarra, County Mayo; both share similar long necks and long rectangular base.

== Function ==
Modern archaeologists assume both the Corleck and Corraghy were placed on top of a large shrine. They seem to have been buried around the same time, perhaps to hide them from early Christians keen to eradicate the worship of pagan idols or any history of Celtic "head-cults".

== Sources ==
- Barron, Thomas J. "Some Beehive Quernstones from Counties Cavan and Monaghan". Clogher Record, volume 9, No. 1, 1976. JSTOR 27695733
- Kelly, Eamonn. "The Iron Age". In Ó Floinn, Raghnall; Wallace, Patrick (eds). Treasures of the National Museum of Ireland: Irish Antiquities. Dublin: National Museum of Ireland, 2002. ISBN 978-0-7171-2829-7
- Lanigan Wood, Helen. "Images of stone". Belfast: Blackstaff Press, 1976. ISBN 0-8564-0110-2
- Ó Hogain, Dáithí. "Patronage & Devotion in Ancient Irish Religion". History Ireland, volume 8, no. 4, winter 2000. JSTOR 27724824
- Ross, Anne. The Pagan Celts. Denbighshire: John Jones, 1998. ISBN 978-1-8710-8361-3
- Ross, Anne. Druids: Preachers of Immortality. Cheltenham: The History Press, 2010. ISBN 978-0-7524-1433-1
- Rynne, Etienne. "Celtic Stone Idols in Ireland". In: Thomas, Charles. The Iron Age in the Irish Sea Province: Papers given at a C.B.A. Conference held at Cardiff, January 3 to 5, 1969. London: Council for British Archaeology, 1972.
- Smyth, Jonathan. Gentleman and Scholar: Thomas James Barron, 1903 – 1992. Cumann Seanchais Bhreifne, 2012. ISBN 978-0-9534-9937-3
- Waddell, John. Pagan Ireland: Ritual and Belief in Another World. Dublin: Wordwell Books, 2023. ISBN 978-1-9167-4202-4
- Waddell, John. The Prehistoric Archaeology of Ireland. Galway: Galway University Press, 1998. ISBN 978-1-8698-5739-4
