= 1997 Ulster Senior Football Championship final =

- Event: 1997 Ulster Senior Championship
Cavan	Derry
1-14	0-16
- Date: 20 July 1997
- Venue: St Tiernach's Park, Clones
- Man of the Match: Dermot McCabe
- Referee: Pat McEnaney (Monaghan)
- Attendance: 34,349

The 1997 Ulster Senior Football Championship final was played at St Tiernach's Park in Clones on 20 July 1997. It was contested by Cavan and Derry.

Cavan were looking for their first title since 1969, while Derry hadn't won since 1993.

Cavan entered the game as underdogs, but bridged a 28-year gap to win a record 39th Ulster title. Substitute Jason O'Reilly got the decisive goal, while Ronan Carolan was top scorer with 6 points. Dermot McCabe was selected as man of the match while Stephen King had the honour of lifting the Anglo-Celt Cup as captain.

== Match details ==
20 July 1997

Cavan	1-14 – 0-16	Derry
R. Carolan 0-6; J. O'Reilly 1-0; P. Reilly 0-3; L. Reilly 0-2; D. McCabe 0-1; R. Cunningham 0-1; F. Cahill 0-1		A. Tohill 0-4; J. Brolly 0-3; G. McGill 0-2; G. Coleman 0-2; J. Cassidy 0-1; F. McCusker 0-1; D. Dougan 0-1; J. McBride 0-1; K. McKeever 0-1

St Tiernach's Park, Clones
Referee: Pat McEnaney (Monaghan)

Cavan	Derry

1	Paul O'Dowd
2	Philip Kermath
3	Ciarán Brady
4	Terry Farrelly
5	Gerry Sheridan
6	Bernard Morris
7	Patrick Sheils
8	Stephen King (c)
9	Dermot McCabe
10	Peter Reilly
11	Ronan Carolan
12	Raymond Cunningham
13	Larry Reilly
14	Fintan Cahill
15	Damien O'Reilly
Substitutes:
17	Mickey Graham for L. Reilly
18	Philip Smith for King
20	Jason O'Reilly for Cahill
Manager:
Martin McHugh

1	Damien McCusker
2	Kieran McKeever (c)
3	David O'Neill
4	Gary Coleman
5	Seán Marty Lockhart
6	Henry Downey
7	Johnny McBride
8	Anthony Tohill
9	Dermot Heaney
10	Gary McGill
11	Dermot Dougan
12	Fergal McCusker
13	Joe Brolly
14	Seamus Downey
15	Joe Cassidy
Substitutes:
17	Karl Diamond for Dougan
19	Gary Doyle for McGill
Manager:
Brian Mullins

Man of the Match:
Dermot McCabe
