= Pencreigiau'r Llan =

Protected area in Ceredigion, Wales

Pencreigiau'r Llan is a Site of Special Scientific Interest in Ceredigion, west Wales.

== See also ==
- List of Sites of Special Scientific Interest in Ceredigion
