= Bontnewydd, Ceredigion =

Village in Ceredigion, Wales

Coordinates: 52.272°N 4.027°W

Bontnewydd
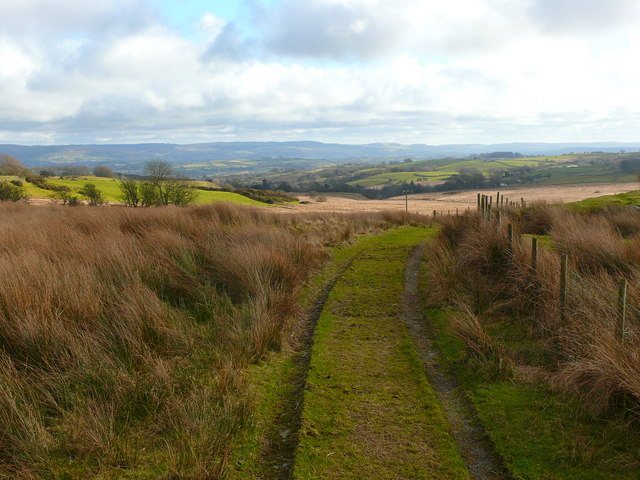
- Mynydd Bach

- Location within Ceredigion
- Population: 100
- OS grid reference: SN617657
  - Cardiff: 90 mi (140 km)
- Community: Lledrod
- Principal area: Ceredigion
- Preserved county: Dyfed
- Country: Wales
- Sovereign state: United Kingdom
- Post town: TREGARON
- Postcode district: SY23
- Dialling code: 01974
- Police: Dyfed-Powys
- Fire: Mid and West Wales
- Ambulance: Welsh
- UK Parliament: Ceredigion Preseli

Bontnewydd is a small village in the community of Lledrod, in Ceredigion, Wales, lying between Tregaron and Aberystwyth near the village of Bronant. It is on the edge of the wild area of upland common called Mynydd Bach. The rivers Ddu and Aeron meet to the south-east of the village. The Llyn Eiddwen SSSI is close by.

The village's primary school, Ysgol Bontnewydd, was awarded £12 million in 2023 from the Welsh Government's Sustainable Schools Challenge competition. The funding will be used to build a new, larger school in the village. The school is aiming to reduce the carbon footprint of the new building by reusing building materials from another old school campus, including slate, wood, and bricks. The new school building is expected to be completed in 2026.
