= Clogher Record =

Ulster historical journal

- Discipline: History
- Language: English

Publication details
- History: 1953-present
- Publisher: Clogher Historical Society (Ireland)
- Frequency: Annually

Standard abbreviations
- ISO 4: Clogher Rec.

Indexing
- ISSN: 0412-8079
- LCCN: 86643158
- JSTOR: 04128079
- OCLC no.: 468008548

Links
- Journal homepage

Clogher Record is a local history journal published annually since 1953 by the Clogher Historical Society (Irish: Cumann Seanchais Chlochair). It covers the history of Counties Fermanagh, Monaghan and south Tyrone, as well as covering a tiny part of south Donegal.
