= Rhos Llawr Cwrt National Nature Reserve =

Coordinates: 52.1225°N 4.3216°W

Rhos Llawr Cwrt National Nature Reserve nestles in the base of the Clettwr valley, some 10 kilometres from the Ceredigion coast, between Ffostrasol and Talgarreg.

Glaciers have scraped and shaped this landscape and evidence of the last Ice Age can be seen everywhere. The most striking of these are the remains of the pingos found on the reserve, landforms which were once small hills but whose summits collapsed when the ice which formed them melted.

The site carries international importance because it holds one of the best populations of the marsh fritillary butterfly in Wales. At peak times, thousands of butterflies can be seen flying around parts of the site.
