= Penuwch =

Village in Ceredigion, Wales

Coordinates: 52.245°N 4.057°W

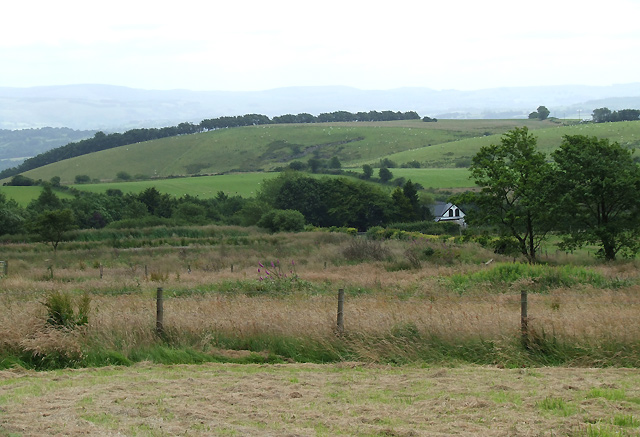
- Penuwch farmland, Ceredigion

- Location within Ceredigion
- OS grid reference: SN597628
- Principal area: Ceredigion
- Country: Wales
- Sovereign state: United Kingdom
- Post town: TREGARON
- Postcode district: SY24
- Dialling code: 01974
- Police: Dyfed-Powys
- Fire: Mid and West Wales
- Ambulance: Welsh
- UK Parliament: Ceredigion Preseli
- Senedd Cymru – Welsh Parliament: Ceredigion Penfro

Penuwch is a rural village in Ceredigion, Wales.

Penuwch is about 1,000 feet above sea level and 8 miles west of Tregaron while the coast is a similar distance further west. The old primary school has been renovated into a pub whilst the old pub has been converted into a static and touring caravan site. Penuwch has a bus twice a day to Aberystwyth (route 588). There is a fishery in the village and a Methodist chapel with a small graveyard.

== History ==
There is little recorded history, although a few houses and farms date from the 1800s or earlier. The Sarn Helen Roman road passes a couple of miles to the east and there is evidence of 20th century quarrying at several sites. Llyn Fanod, an upland lake and Site of Special Scientific Interest, is nearby at Bontnewydd. Llyn Farch, another upland lake, was still shown on 19th century maps just north of the village centre but is now an area of marsh. During the 19th century there was a local tradition that Merlin had prophesied that when Llyn Farch dried up, the town of Carmarthen would sink.

Up until the mid 19th century much of the area around Penuwch was still unenclosed common land and many Tai Unnos (One night houses) were built.

== Places of worship ==
Penuwch lies in the ecclesiastical parish of Nantcwnlle, anciently known as Llancwnlle. The parish church stands in the nearby village of Bwlchllan. A Calvinistic Methodist chapel was built in Penuwch in 1817 and the current chapel building dates from 1867. In 1913 an Anglican mission church was also built in the upper part of the village. This church was closed and converted into a private residence during the latter part of the 20th century.

== Primary school ==
Penuwch Primary School was opened in 1879. In 2013 the School was merged with other local Primary schools including Llangeitho and was known as the Penuwch campus of Rhos Helyg Primary School. The school closed in 2014, and after purchase by a local farmer became 'The Hungry Ram', a Bistro/Restaurant.The school building is currently not being used.
