= James MacKillop (author) =

American writer and professor (born 1939)

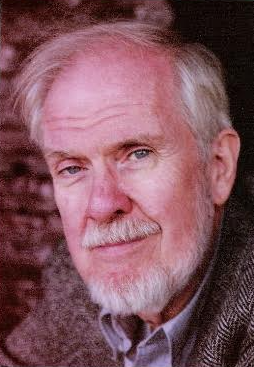
- Born: 1939 (age 86–87)
- Occupations: Academic, author

James MacKillop (born May 31, 1939, Pontiac, Michigan) is an American professor and scholar of Celtic and Irish studies and an arts journalist. A child of Gaelic-speaking Highland emigrants, he has lived in Upstate New York since the late 1960s.

== Early life and education ==
MacKillop was raised in Southeast Michigan and attended the University of Detroit High School and Wayne State University (BA, MA in English). At Wayne, he wrote for the Daily Collegian and captained the university team on the GE College Bowl television program. He received a Ph.D. from Syracuse University and was a visiting fellow in Celtic Languages at Harvard University.

== Career ==
MacKillop taught for more than forty years at various universities. Appointments include Michigan Technological University, Onondaga Community College, State University of New York College at Cortland and the S. I. Newhouse School of Public Communications. He also held a year's appointment as Professeur Invité at the University of Rennes 1 in France. He was awarded the SUNY Chancellor's Award for Excellence.

MacKillop has published ten books, dozens of scholarly articles, and thousands of newspaper items. These include The Dictionary of Celtic Mythology (Oxford) and Myth & Legends of the Celts (Penguin). His Irish Literature: A Reader (Syracuse), with Maureen Murphy is used in some university Irish literature courses. Speaking of Words (Holt, Rinehart) was co-edited with Donna Woolfolk Cross. Writing for newspapers since college years, MacKillop has been the drama critic with the Syracuse New Times for decades, winning the Syracuse Press Club Award for criticism sixteen times.

Joining as a graduate student, MacKillop served on the executive committee of the American Conference for Irish Studies (ACIS) for ten years, organizing three national conventions (Syracuse, 1989; Belfast-Queens U., 1995; Albany, 1997), and serving as president, 1995–97.

== Publications ==
=== Books ===
- With Donna Woolfolk Cross, Speaking of Words: A Language Reader New York: Holt, Rinehart & Winston, 1978, 1982, 1986
- With Thomas Friedmann, The Copy Book New York: Holt, Rinehart & Winston, 1980
- Fionn mac Cumhaill: Celtic Myth in English Literature Syracuse: Syracuse University Press, 1986, 2001
- With Maureen O'Rourke Murphy, Irish Literature: A Reader Syracuse: Syracuse University Press, 1987. Revised as An Irish Literature Reader. Syracuse: Syracuse University Press, 2005
- Dictionary of Celtic Mythology Oxford: Oxford University Press, 1998
- Contemporary Irish Cinema: From the Quiet Man to Dancing at Lughnasa Syracuse: Syracuse University Press, 1999
- Myths and Legends of the Celts London: Penguin Books, 2005
- Unauthorized History of the American Conference for Irish Studies 2012
- “The Rebels” and Selected Short Fiction by Richard Power Syracuse: Syracuse University Press, 2018
- Highlanders: Unlocking Identity Through History Jefferson, N.C.: McFarland and Company, 2023

=== Articles (selected) ===
- A Primer of Irish Numbers, Irish Spirit, ed. Patricia Monaghan. Dublin: Wolfhound Press, 2001. p. 111–119.
- Politics and Spelling Irish, or Thirteen Ways of Looking at ‘Banshee’, Canadian Journal of Irish Studies, 27, no. 2 (Dec., 1991), 93–102.
- Fitzgerald's Gatsby: Star of Stag and Screen, The Recorder: A Journal of the American Irish Historical Society, 3, no. 2 (Winter, 1989), 76–88.
- Fionn mac Cumhaill, Our Contemporary, Mythe et folklore celtiques et leurs expressions littéraires en Irlande, ed. R. Alluin et B. Esbarbelt. Lille, Fr: Université de Lille, 1986 (1988). p. 69–90.
- The Quiet Man Speaks, Working Papers in Irish Studies [Northeastern University, Boston], 87-2/3 (Spring, 1987), 32–44.
- Meville's Bartleby on Film, American Short Stories on Film, ed. E. Alsen. Munich: Langenscheidt-Longman, 1986. p. 101–116.
- Ireland and the Movies: From the Volta Cinema to RTÉ, Éire-Ireland, 18, no. 3 (Summer, 1984), 7-22.
- The Hungry Grass: Richard Power's Pastoral Elegy, Éire-Ireland, 18, no. 3 (Fall, 1983), 86–99.
- Yeats, Joyce and the Irish Language, Éire-Ireland, 15, no. 1 (Spring, 1980), 138–148.
- Finn MacCool: The Hero and the Anti-Hero, Views of the Irish Peasantry, 1800-1916, ed. D. Casey and R. E. Rhodes. Hamden, Ct: Archon Books, 1977. p. 86–106.
- Ulster Violence in Fiction, Conflict in Ireland, ed. E. A. Sullivan and H. A. Wilson. Gainesville: University of Florida, Department of Behavioral Studies, 1976. p. 131–151.
- Yeats and the Gaelic Muse, Antigonish Review, no. 11 (Autumn, 1972), 96–109.
