= Adolf Mahr =

Austrian archaeologist and museum director;

Adolf Mahr MRIA
- Mahr in 1948
- Born: 7 May 1887; Trent, Tyrol, Austria, Austria-Hungary
- Died: 27 May 1951 (aged 64); Bonn, West Germany
- Known for: Directorship of the National Museum of Ireland

Adolf Mahr (7 May 1887 – 27 May 1951) was an Austrian archaeologist, who served as director of the National Museum of Ireland in Dublin in the 1930s, and is credited with advancing the work of the museum substantially.

Mahr became a highly controversial figure in twentieth-century Irish history owing to his early leadership of the Dublin Nazi chapter, and propaganda broadcasting from Germany, and was not allowed to return to his role after the Second World War.

== Life ==
=== Early life ===
Mahr was born in May 1887 in Trent in the southern reaches of the Habsburg Empire. His father, Gustav Johann Mahr (1858–1930), and grandfather, Franz Anton Mahr (1830–1891), were military bandmasters and well-known composers. His mother, Maria Antonia Schroll, like his father, was a German from the Sudetenland. Mahr was brought up as a Roman Catholic, later becoming an atheist, and later still (at least nominally) Protestant.

Mahr served in the Austrian Army in 1906, attaining the rank of lieutenant, and then studied geography and prehistory at the University of Vienna, where he also sustained a long-term arm injury while duelling.

=== Career ===
Mahr went to work for a museum in Linz, Austria's third city, and then the Natural History and Prehistoric Museum of Vienna, where he rose to the ranks of curator and deputy director of a section. His excavation work included early exploration of the salt mine and Iron Age Celtic cemetery at Hallstatt. Mahr arrived in Ireland in 1927 to work as Senior Keeper of (Irish) Antiquities in the National Museum of Ireland in Dublin, succeeding Walther Bremer. Mahr implemented the recommendations of Professor Nils Lithberg on reorganisation of the collections, and otherwise worked to bring order to the museum's holdings. One of his key achievements was the production of a card index of excavations and finds, and he also drove a return to active archaeological dig work, after an interval of decades.

In 1934 Éamon de Valera appointed Mahr as the director of the museum, for which he built an international reputation through creativity and dedication. De Valera was so impressed with his commitment that he wrote him a personal cheque for one excavation project, in Drimnagh, Dublin, for what was then a considerable sum. Notwithstanding his leadership of the local Nazi organisation, Mahr worked with wealthy Jewish donor, Albert Bender of San Francisco, and they exchanged letters over several years.

During a stay for an archaeology congress in Berlin and family visit to Austria in September 1939, he was prevented from returning to Dublin by the Nazi policy of "Heim ins Reich". Fifty other members of the German colony were shipped back to the Fatherland on 11 September 1939. As he could not return to his directorship, he took a leave of absence. At the time, he still expected to be back in Dublin by early 1940.

=== Nazism ===
As the Nazi Party rose to power in Germany in the 1930s, Mahr joined in 1933 and became the Local Group Leader (Ortsgruppenleiter) of the official Nazi Party in Ireland – the Auslandsorganisation (NSDAP-AO). During his time as Nazi leader he recruited roughly 23 Germans.

In January 1946 Mahr was arrested and accused of being a Nazi spy, with a claim that he used his position as Director of the National Museum to plan Hitler's invasion of Ireland. No formal charges were brought. After his release, Mahr tried to return to his director's position in Ireland, but was not allowed to do so.

=== Late life ===
Mahr sought to return to his directorship, and the Taoiseach was originally in favour, given his achievements, but there was opposition from Ireland's Head of Military Intelligence, and a vocal TD, James Dillon. In the end, Mahr was left in Germany, but given some pension, and derived some income from occasional lectures. He died of heart failure in Bonn while preparing for a new job, on 27 May 1951.

== Family ==
In 1921 Mahr married Maria van Bemmelen (1901–1975), daughter of the Dutch university professor and zoologist Johan Frans van Bemmelen. They had four children, two born in Ireland; all were raised in Dublin in the 1930s, but they were stranded in Germany or German-occupied Austria in September 1939 and were unable to travel back to Ireland, eventually settling down in post-war (West) Germany. His marriage deteriorated from 1941. One daughter (Ingrid) later moved back to Ireland for a time. The eldest daughter, Hilde, is the subject of Chapter 7, "Hilde's Journey 1945", in Mullins' book on Adolf Mahr. It describes how the 18-year-old girl, in the attempt to re-unite her parents, "comes through a defeated Germany, a land in ruins, to safety".

== See also ==
- Fritz Brase, leader of the Irish Army School of Music
