= Thomas Hughes Jones =

Welsh poet and writer (1895–1966)

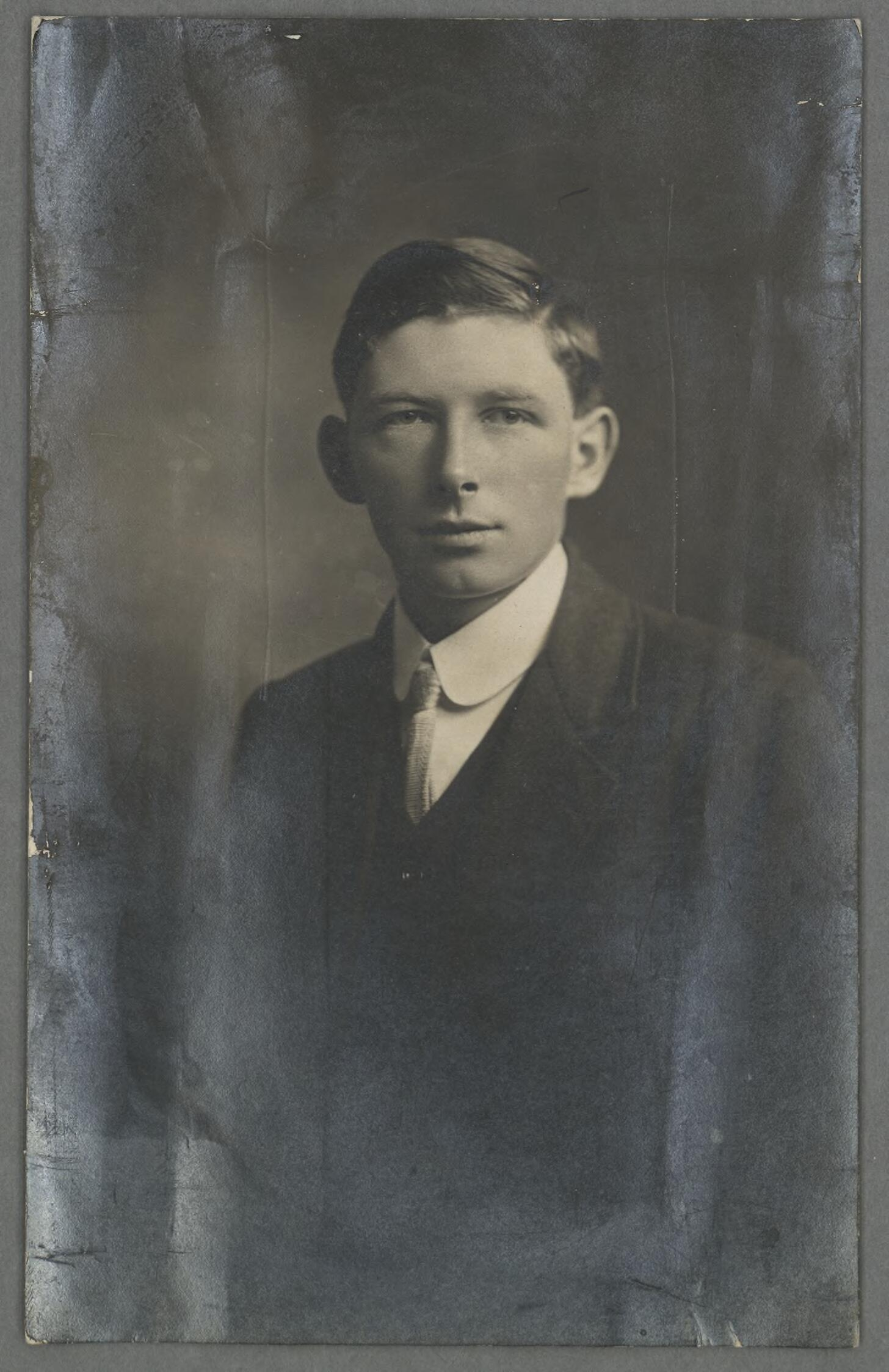
Thomas Hughes Jones

Thomas Hughes Jones (23 January 1895 – 11 May 1966) was a Welsh poet and writer from Ceredigion (Cardiganshire) in West Wales. He wrote several collections of stories and contributed to various journals, including Welsh Outlook, throughout his career. In 1940 he won the Literature Medal for his story, "Sgweier Hafila", at the National Eisteddfod. His pen name was generally abbreviated to "T. Hughes Jones".

His name is inscribed on the memorial to the poets of Mynydd Bach.

== Early life ==
Jones was born in Blaenpennal to Rhys Jones and Ann Hughes along with his younger sister, Jane. His mother died when he was six and his father subsequently moved the family to Blaen Aeron Farm. A local poet, John Rowlands, lived at the neighbouring farm and began to teach young Tom cynghanedd, a traditional form of Welsh poetry. Together they entered local eisteddfodau where Jones' work - in recitation and composition - was generally successful.

Jones studied at the local school, Ysgol Tanygarreg, and became noted for his academic achievements and his ready answers. At a suggestion from the headmaster, his father moved him to the county school in Tregaron, where he became known as 'Tom Bardd' ('Poet Tom'). He soon after won his first chair at the Llanddewi Brefi eisteddfod in 1913 at the age of 17. He later won three additional chairs at eisteddfodau in Tregaron, Ysbyty Ystwyth and Rhydcymerau before he was 25 years of age.

== University ==
Jones attended University College of Wales, Aberystwyth in 1913 and matriculated in 1916 with second-class honours in Welsh. He continued writing during his time at university, contributing frequently to Y Wawr, which he also edited in 1915–16, and later to The Dragon - both university periodicals. His studies were interrupted by the war in 1916, when he served in France with the Welsh Guards, but he resumed his studies upon his return and finished an M.A. in 1922. His thesis is entitled, 'Social life in Wales in the eighteenth century as illustrated in its popular literature of the period'.

== Work ==
Jones continued to write throughout his career and his reflections on the First World War are considered an important part of the reaction at the time from Welsh speakers.

=== National Eisteddfod, 1940 ===
Jones won the medal for literature for his "long short-story" entitled "Sgweier Hafila" in the 1940 National Eisteddfod, also known as the Radio Eisteddfod since it was held remotely due to safety concerns during war-time Britain. The Prose Medal was awarded in the form of a Literature Medal for the best literary work, as opposed to the genre-specific prize in years past. Kate Roberts, who adjudicated the competition, awarded the prize to Jones and praised the manner in which his story presents an allegory for all who yearn for something better and succumb to lunacy when they cannot have it. Gildas Tibbot, as part of his preface in Atgof a Storïau Eraill, praised Jones for his introduction of the "long short-story" into Welsh-language literature, a genre later explored by Roberts herself.

== Publications ==
- Sgweier Hafila a Storïau Eraill (1941)
- Amser i Ryfel (Novel) (1944)
- Mewn Diwrnod a Storïau Eraill (1948)
- Atgof a Storïau Eraill (Ed. Gildas Tibbot) (1971)
