= Llyn Eiddwen =

Lake in Ceredigion, Wales

Coordinates: 52.283°N 4.044°W

Llyn Eiddwen (Welsh pronunciation) is a lake and site of special scientific interest near Trefenter in Ceredigion, Wales. It is the source of the River Aeron.

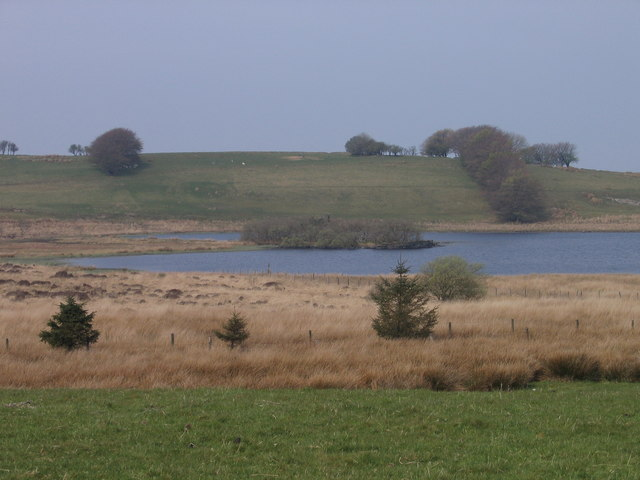
View of Llyn Eiddwen

This natural lake provides an environment to preserve rare local water-plant life and seasonal animals. It is owned and managed by the Wildlife Trust of South and West Wales. Surrounded by sheep-grazed common land, it is part of a national nature reserve. Visitors come on foot from the north or on bridleways from the south.

Remote and peaceful, Llyn Eiddwen National Nature Reserve lies in the gentle slopes of Mynydd Bach, to the north west of Tregaron town in Ceredigion. The wet and quiet nature of its habitats suits shy creatures such as water voles and otters. A climb to the summit of the surrounding hills reveals views of Cardigan Bay to the west, and of the Pumlumon and Elenydd uplands to the north and east.

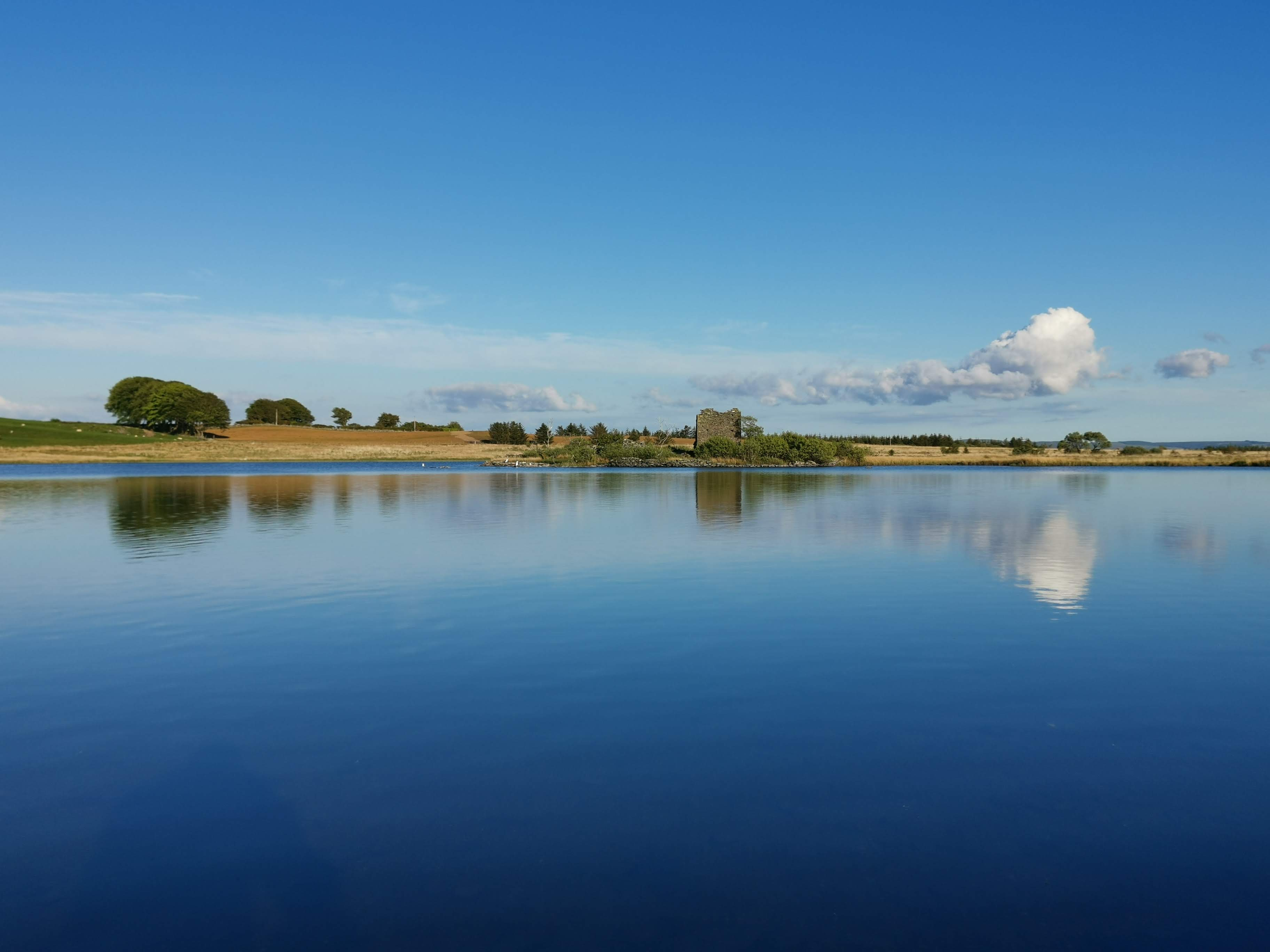

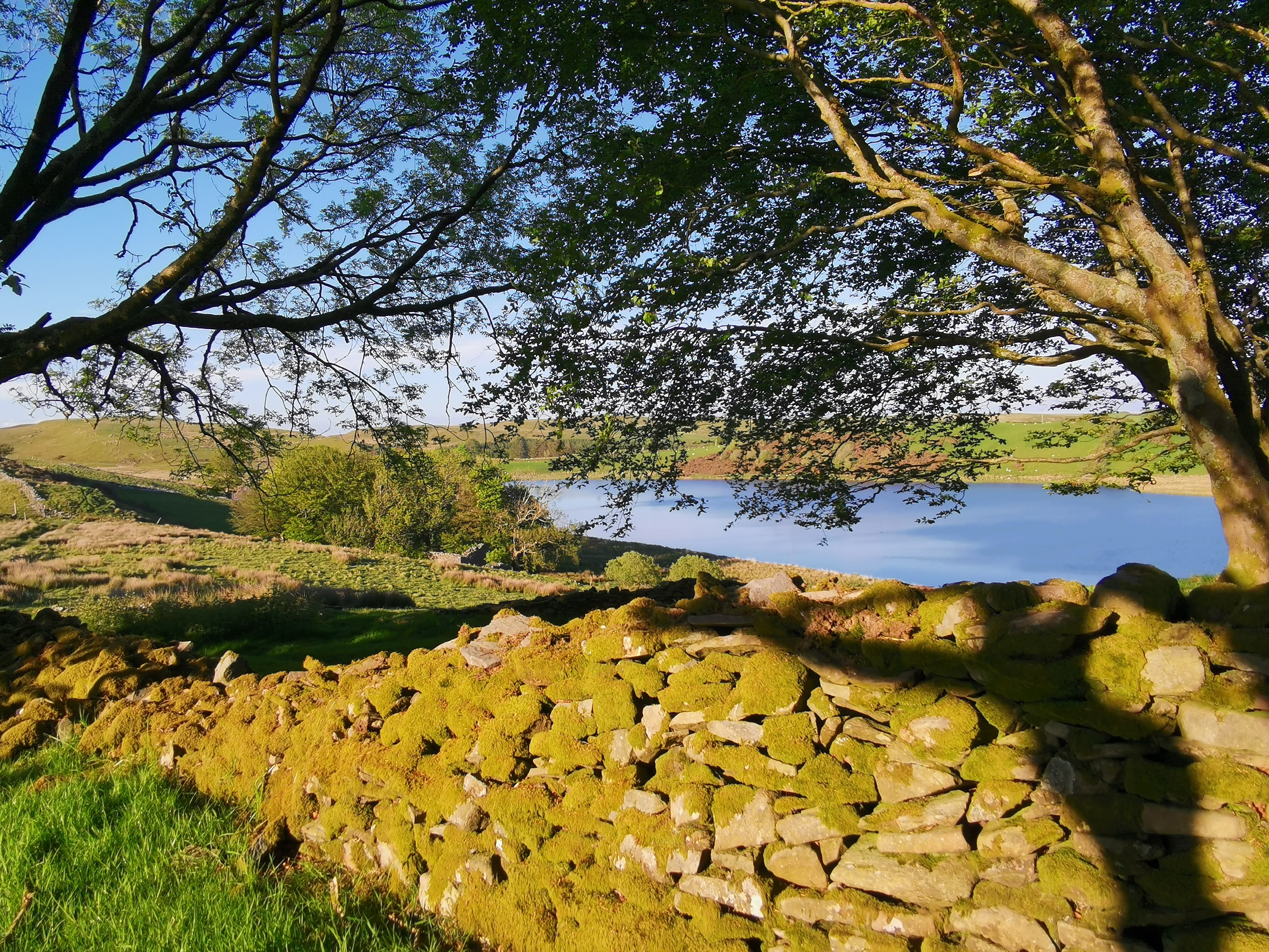

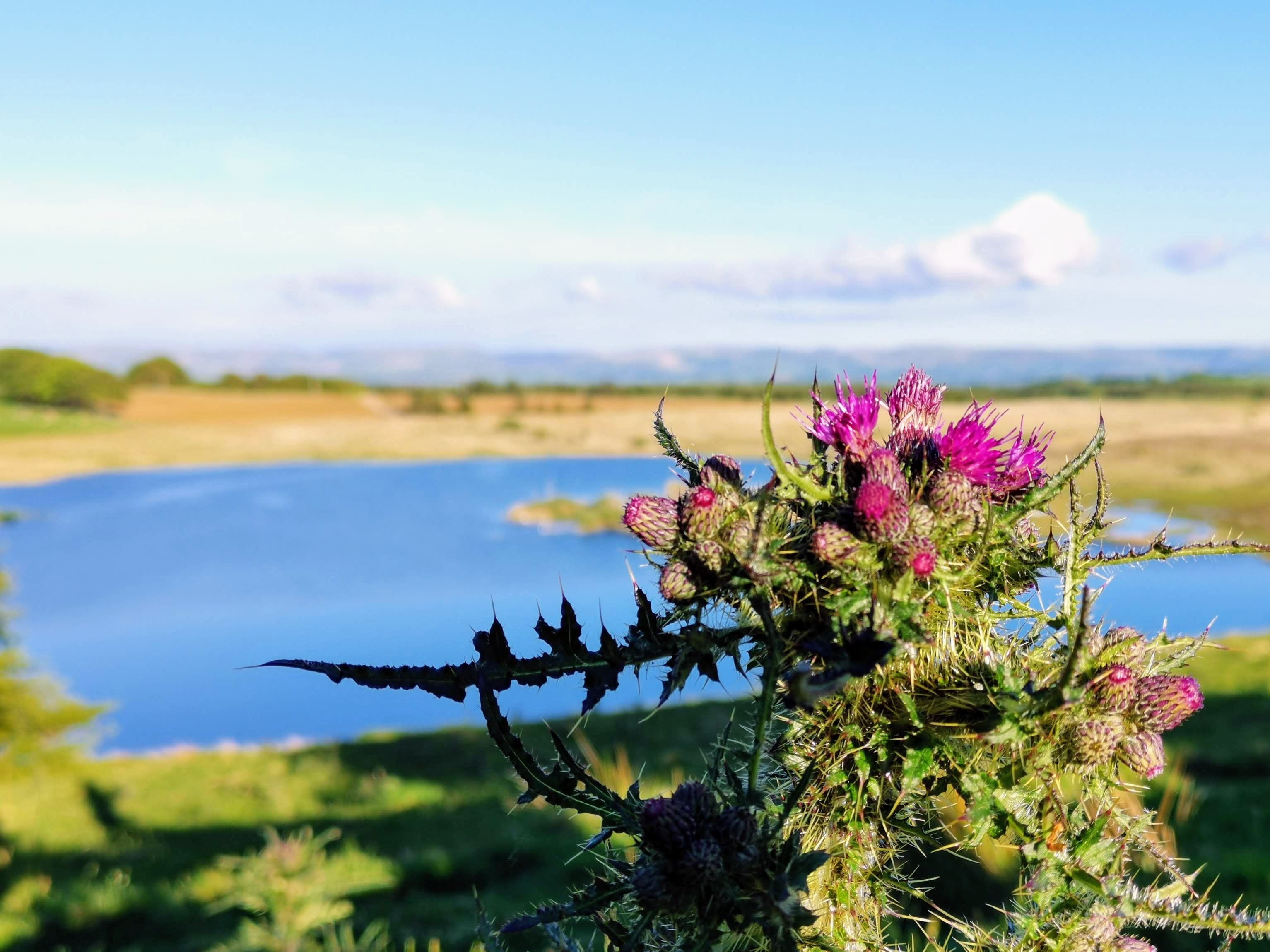
