= Ár nDraíocht Féin =

American neopagan druid organization

Ár nDraíocht Féin: A Druid Fellowship, Inc. (ADF)
- Logo of ADF

Total population
- c. 1,500

Founder
- Isaac Bonewits

Regions with significant populations
- United States: unknown
- Canada: unknown
- United Kingdom: unknown

Religions
- Contemporary druidism, Proto-Indo-European religion

Scriptures
- None; influence from the Eddur, Lebor Gabála Érenn, Mabinogion, Ṛgveda, etc.

Languages
- Welsh, English, Irish, Latin, Proto-Indo-European

Ár nDraíocht Féin: A Druid Fellowship, Inc. (or ADF) is a non-profit religious organization based in the United States, dedicated to the study and further development of modern Druidry.

In Modern Irish, Ár nDraíocht Féin (pronounced [aːɾˠ ˌn̪ˠɾˠiːəxt̪ˠ ˈheːnʲ, -ˈfʲeːnʲ]) means "our own magic" (Druidism). "A Druid Fellowship" is therefore a backronym of "ADF". The organization was founded in 1983 and incorporated in 1990 as a U.S. 501(c)(3) non-profit organization by Isaac Bonewits. The organization's first public announcement and membership sign-up took place at the first WinterStar Symposium in 1984 at Burr Oak State Park in Glouster, Ohio. ADF was originally organized as an Association, with Articles of Association signed by all Trustees on April 18, 1987.

ADF is a neodruidic organization practicing a unique tradition of Neopagan Druidry and is mostly U.S.-based, with members and groups in most states and in several other countries as well. During the years 2000 through 2010 to the present, ADF's membership has remained well over 1000 persons, making it the largest public form of definitively Neopagan Druidism in the US.

Despite the Gaelic name, ADF Druidry actually encompasses all Indo-European religions, including Celtic, Germanic, Hellenic, Roman, Slavic, Gaulish, and Vedic religious practices. In that sense, ADF uses the term Druid as "a member of the Indo-European intelligentsia, especially of the clergy" or even more broadly as "a worshipper of Indo-European gods and goddesses". Strictly speaking, members of ADF are not only "druids", but are also members of related Indo-European religions which may have other terms for people in such clergy roles (e.g., gothi for clergy of ancient Norse religions).

== History ==
Isaac Bonewits founded ADF with the goal of "researching and expanding sound modern scholarship about the ancient Celts and other Indo-European peoples, in order to reconstruct what the Old Religions of Europe really were." Bonewits wanted to focus on scholarship as a reaction to more revisionist types of Neopaganism, such as those claiming direct descent from a "Great Matriarchy" of pre-historic times (see James Frazer's The Golden Bough). The works of Georges Dumézil on Indo-European social structures and mythologies were especially influential in Bonewits's thinking.

Related to the focus on scholarship, Isaac started the ADF Study Program with the goal of producing credible, knowledgeable Neopagan clergy; actual druid priests and priestesses, who would be able to fulfill all the roles of modern clergy for other Neopagans, such as birth, marriage, and funerary rites. Similarly, ADF's official motto of "Why not excellence?" is an expression of the desire to create a bona fide religious tradition, rather than a small group that few would take seriously and which would not be around in a few years. ADF's unofficial motto, "As fast as a speeding oak," is meant to remind members that excellence takes time.

ADF was a reaction to many of the cultish pseudo-religions (Neopagan or not) with which Bonewits was familiar and (in a few cases) had experienced. Therefore, one of the first "dogmas" he promulgated was the "Doctrine of Archdruidic Fallibility", which states that everyone, even the Archdruid, can make mistakes. However, ADF was also a reaction to the Reformed Druids of North America, a freethinking religious group which Bonewits considered too loose and not Neopagan enough.

In 2019 The ADF publicly repudiated Bonewits (who died in 2010) after he was accused of child sexual abuse.

== Beliefs ==
ADF promotes a neo-druidism in which worshipers perform rituals honoring three kinds of entities: gods and goddesses, ancestors (honored dead), and nature spirits. Examples of gods and goddesses worshipped include Lugh, Cernunnos, the Morrigan, Thor, Freya, Apollo, Athena, Vesta, Ceres, and many other ancient, pre-Christian, Indo-European deities. Although various pantheons or "hearth cultures" are allowed, "mixing and matching" unrelated deities within a single rite is discouraged. Ancestors usually refers to the direct blood ancestors of the worshiper, but can include other honored dead (friends, mythological heroes, etc.), too. Nature spirits includes general animal (totem) spirits as well as whatever spirits are present in the place of worship, such as a local river spirit. Most ADF rituals occur outdoors.

In ADF terms, the triad of deities, ancestors, and nature spirits is called the "Three Kindreds". There are other triads in ADF practice, such as the "three realms" of the Underworld (associated with the ancestors), the Heavens (associated with the gods), and this world (associated with the nature spirits); these are similar to the three worlds of the Celts, and to the Norse realms of Niflheim, Asgard, and Midgard. There are also three parts to this world; the Land, the Sea (including saltwater and freshwater bodies), and the Sky.

All of these triads are based on the common and pervasive theme of "threes" attributed to ancient Indo-European (and particularly Celtic) cultures. Similarly, ADF uses the common Indo-European themes of a sacred tree (e.g. the Norse Yggdrasil), a "gatekeeper" or opener of ways (e.g. the Norse god Heimdall, the Celtic god Manannan mac Lir, or the Hellenic god Hermes), and a treaty with hostile entities (e.g. the Norse Jotuns or the Celtic Fomorians). In these ways, ADF practice is an attempt to reconstruct earlier Indo-European beliefs and practices by using the records we have of ancient Indo-European cultures, and looking for commonalities among them which can then be applied to current spiritual practice.

ADF practice straddles the difficult middle ground between pure reconstructionism (attempting to recreate ancient practices as exactly as possible) and a less exclusive form of Neopaganism (an umbrella term for the loose agglomeration of pagan-based religions which arose in the early to middle 20th century, the most popular of which is Wicca). Thus, it attempts to be as authentic as possible given the realities of modern life. For example, ADF forbids any form of blood sacrifice in its official rituals, because even if it were appropriate in relation to one's ancestors (who may have lived in agrarian societies that regularly killed their own food), it is not considered appropriate in modern society.

== Organization ==
Local ADF congregations are known as "groves" (like groves of trees), and while group rituals are often regarded as more powerful than rituals performed individually, In 2017 there were about 70 groves worldwide. ADF also has many solitary members; some by choice, and some because there are no groves within easy traveling distance. There are also ADF "protogroves", which are usually one or two people who would like to start a bigger grove. By forming a protogrove, they are able to appear on the list of ADF groves in the organization's online and printed literature, and so attract potential new members.

One of ADF's cornerstone principles is the notion that it is a public form of Neopaganism. Again, this was partly a reaction to the secretive religious groups Isaac was familiar with, such as closed covens which were limited in size to 13 members, or Masonic-style societies. In addition to promoting cult-ish behavior, such secretism in a larger sense was seen as unnecessarily promulgating the "underground" (occult, hidden) nature of Neopaganism. By making ADF a public tradition, its founder hoped to both prevent ADF from ever becoming a cult, and to further Neopaganism's acceptance in broader society as a credible and sane family of religions.

As a result of these principles and intents, ADF groves are required to have open-to-the-public rituals on or near the eight "High Days" of the common Neopagan calendar such as Bealtaine, Lughnasadh, and Samhain (the holidays of the Wheel of the Year). Such rituals follow an established "core order of ritual" and are expected to focus on one particular pantheon or "hearth culture" for that high day. ADF groves are also required to perform some kind of public service on a quarterly basis (cleaning up parks and other ecological activities are popular).

An annual meeting of ADF is held at an event selected by the membership. Thus far it has been at either the Starwood Festival or the Wellspring Gathering, presently held at Tredara in Madison, Ohio, on Memorial Day Weekend and at Brushwood Folklore Center in the past. This meeting originated as part of the Starwood Festival in 1987 at Bear Creek KOA in East Sparta, Ohio, and was held at Starwood through 1992. Wellspring, run by Stone Creed Grove, became a separate event in 1991, and the National Members Meeting was moved to Wellspring in 1993. ADF still maintains a presence at the Starwood Festival, holding meetings and offering classes and rituals, and sometimes has more members attending there than at the Wellspring Gathering.

Anyone may join ADF, as membership is open to the public.

=== Archdruids ===
- 1984–1996: Phillip Emmons Isaac Bonewits (Founder; Emeritus) (b. 1949 – d. 2010)
- 1996: Ian Corrigan (Jeffrey L. Wyndham) (Emeritus)
- 1996–2001: John "Fox" Adelmann (Emeritus) (First elected Archdruid)
- 2001–2010: Robert Lee "Skip" Ellison (Emeritus)
- 2010–2016: Kirk Sutton Thomas (Emeritus)
- 2016–2025: Jean "Drum" Pagano (Emeritus)
- 2025–Current: Jan Avende

== See also ==
- Druidry (modern)
- Modern Neopaganism
- Order of Bards, Ovates and Druids
- Reformed Druids of North America
