= Robert Lee "Skip" Ellison =

American druid priest, ADF Archdruid from 2001 to 2010

Rev. Robert Lee "Skip" Ellison is an American Druid priest and liturgist and an author in the fields of Druidry, Magic and divination. He was initiated into a Celtic Traditional Wiccan coven in 1982. He has been a member of the Druidic organization Ár nDraíocht Féin since 1990, serving on its Mother Grove since 1992. He served as ADF's Archdruid (Now Emeritus), and is Chief of its Magician's Guild. He was the grove Organizer for Muin Mound Grove, ADF (a Druidic group that maintains a camping and ritual facility in Syracuse, NY by the same name), and became its second Senior Druid, a position he held since 1992. He has been a frequent speaker at Neo-Pagan events including the Starwood Festival, Sirius Rising, and the Wellspring Gathering. He has created a magical training system based on the trees of the forest, and has authored four books on Druidry and divination. He is also a retired industrial electrician.

== Bibliography ==
- The Wheel of the Year at Muin Mound Grove ADF: A Cycle of Druid Rituals (W/CD or cassette)
- The Divine Liver — The Art and Science of Haruspicy as Practiced by the Etruscans and Romans (W/42 card set)
- 2003: The Druids' Alphabet: What Do We Know About the Oghams? Dubsar House. ISBN 1-59405-503-3
- 2005: The Solitary Druid: Walking the Path of Wisdom and Spirit. Citadel. ISBN 0-8065-2675-0

== Discography ==
- The Wheel of the Year
