= Authentic Thaumaturgy =

Tabletop fantasy role-playing game supplement

- 1978 cover
- Designers: Isaac Bonewits
- Publishers: Chaosium 1978; Steve Jackson Games 1998, 2005
- Publication: 1978; 47 years ago
- Website: www.sjgames.com/thaumaturgy/
- ISBN: 1-55634-360-4

Authentic Thaumaturgy is a set of rules for portraying magic in role-playing games, written by Isaac Bonewits. The first edition was published by Chaosium in 1978. A substantially expanded edition was published by Steve Jackson Games in 1998. A third edition appeared in 2005.

== Contents ==
Authentic Thaumaturgy is a sourcebook of ideas for improving fantasy role-playing magic systems by basing them on purportedly real magical practices; the author had a Bachelor of Arts in Magic from the University of California.

The rules are based on the magic system Bonewits claimed to use in real life in his capacity as the Archdruid of Ár nDraíocht Féin.

Bonewits presented 26 Laws of Magic which he explains "are not legislative laws but, like those of physics or of musical harmony, are practical observations that have been accumulating over the course of thousands of years, with remarkable similarity in almost every known human culture. Those of you who prefer to remain skeptical as to the reality of psychic phenomena and the systems of magic developed to control them will at least find these Laws an interesting and detailed guide to what psychologists and anthropologists so patronizingly refer to as “magical thinking.”" Bonewits then presented examples of how some of these laws work.

These 26 laws are (in order): The Law of Knowledge, Self-Knowledge, Cause & Effect, Synchronicity, Association, Similarity, Contagion, Positive Attraction, Negative Attraction, Names, Words of Power, Personification, Invocation, Evocation, Identification, Infinite Data, Finite Senses, Personal Universes, Infinite Universes, Pragmatism, True Falsehoods, Synthesis, Polarity, Dynamic Balance, Perversity, and Unity.
