= RDNA =

RDNA or rDNA may refer to:

- Ribosomal DNA (rDNA), DNA sequence that codes for ribosomal RNA
- Recombinant DNA (rDNA), DNA molecules formed by laboratory methods
- RDNA (microarchitecture) (Radeon DNA), a GPU architecture by AMD
- Reformed Druids of North America, an American Neo-Druidic organization
