= Jean Pagano =

Archdruid of Ár nDraíocht Féin (ADF)

Rev. Jean "Drum" Pagano is a Druid priest and the sixth Archdruid of the neopagan church Ár nDraíocht Féin (ADF).

== History ==
Jean Pagano joined the neopagan church Ár nDraíocht Féin (ADF) in 1984, becoming one of its earliest members and thirty-one years later in 2015 its Archdruid. The Archdruid is the church's name for the chair of the board of directors, which Pagano initially joined in 2010. Pagano focuses his religious leadership on Indo-European beliefs that focus on the primacy of nature and the ritualized worship of the Nature Spirits, Ancestors, and Shining Ones. Druidic practices include study and focus on interpreting ancient traditions in a modern society, so study and daily devotions are a key elements for those who seek to practice in this religious tradition.

== Leadership ==
Pagano focuses on building leadership within his global church, involving those who show leadership potential into various roles and service opportunities through meeting others in the community. The leadership service that Pagano as Archdruid focuses upon is consistent with ADF's belief in orthopraxy (right conduct) vs. orthodoxy (right-belief).

== See also ==
- Druidry (modern)
