= Isaac Bonewits =

American Neopagan leader and writer (1949–2012)

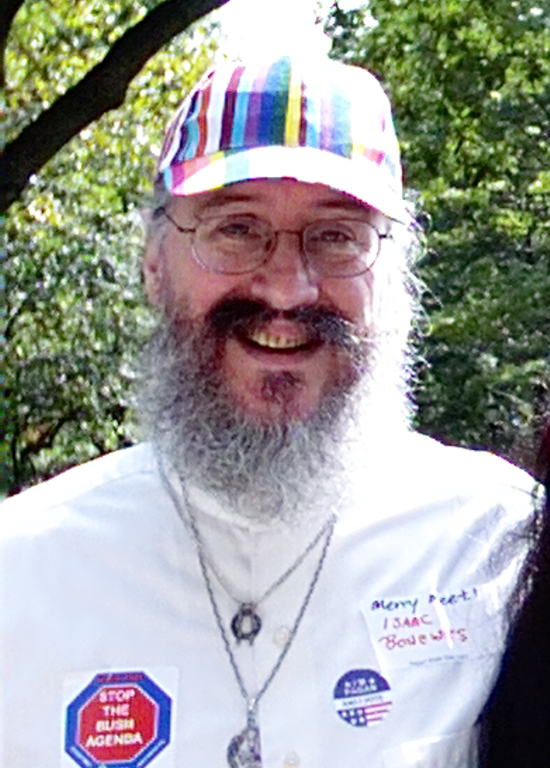
- Bonewits in 2004
- Born: Phillip Emmons Isaac Bonewits; October 1, 1949; Royal Oak, Michigan
- Died: August 12, 2010 (aged 60); Valley Cottage, New York
- Education: University of California, Berkeley (B.A., Magic)
- Occupations: Public speaker, liturgist, songwriter
- Spouse: Phaedra Bonewits (m. 2007)
- Children: 1
- Website: http://www.neopagan.net

Phillip Emmons Isaac Bonewits (October 1, 1949 – August 12, 2010) was an American Neo-Druid who wrote a number of books on the subject of Neopaganism and magic. Bonewits was a public speaker, liturgist, singer and songwriter, and founder of the Neopagan organizations Ár nDraíocht Féin (ADF) and the Aquarian Anti-Defamation League.

== Early life and education ==
Bonewits was born on October 1, 1949, in Royal Oak, Michigan, as the fourth of five children. His father was a Presbyterian while his mother a Catholic. Spending much of his childhood in Ferndale, Michigan, he was moved at age 12 to San Clemente, California, where he spent a short time in a Catholic high school before he went back to public school to graduate from high school a year early. He enrolled at UC Berkeley in 1966 and graduated in 1970 with a Bachelor of Arts in magic, perhaps becoming the first and only person known to have ever received any kind of academic degree in magic from an accredited university.

In 1966, while enrolled at UC Berkeley, Bonewits joined the Reformed Druids of North America (RDNA). Bonewits was ordained as a Neo-druid priest in 1969. During this period, the 18-year-old Bonewits was also recruited by the Church of Satan, but left due to political and philosophical conflicts with Anton LaVey. During his stint in the Church of Satan, Bonewits appeared in some scenes of the 1970 documentary Satanis: The Devil's Mass. Bonewits, in his article "My Satanic Adventure", asserts that the rituals in Satanis were staged for the movie at the behest of the filmmakers and were not authentic ceremonies.

== Career ==
=== 1970s: writer and editor ===
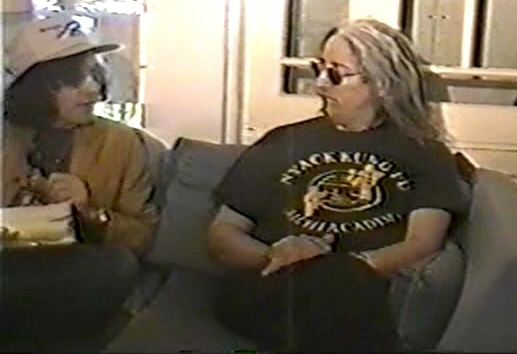
Bonewits (right) at Camp Ramblewood.

Bonewits' first book, Real Magic, was published in 1971. Between 1973 and 1975 Bonewits was employed as the editor of Gnostica magazine in Minnesota (published by Llewellyn Publications). He established an offshoot group of the Reformed Druids of North America (RDNA) called the Schismatic Druids of North America, and helped create a group called the Hasidic Druids of North America (despite, in his words, his "lifelong status as a gentile"). He also founded the short-lived Aquarian Anti-Defamation League (AADL), an early Pagan civil rights group.

In 1976, Bonewits moved back to Berkeley and rejoined his original grove there, now part of the New Reformed Druids of North America (NRDNA). He was later elected Archdruid of the Berkeley Grove.

=== 1980s: founding of Ár nDraíocht Féin ===
Throughout his life Bonewits had varying degrees of involvement with occult groups including Gardnerian Wicca and the New Reformed Orthodox Order of the Golden Dawn (a Wiccan organization not to be confused with the Hermetic Order of the Golden Dawn). Bonewits was a regular presenter at Neopagan conferences and festivals all over the US, as well as attending gaming conventions in the Bay Area. He promoted his book Authentic Thaumaturgy to gamers as a way of organizing Dungeons & Dragons games.

In 1983, Bonewits founded Ár nDraíocht Féin (also known as "A Druid Fellowship" or ADF), which was incorporated in 1990 in the state of Delaware as a U.S. 501(c)3 non-profit organization. Although illness curtailed many of his activities and travels for a time, he remained Archdruid of ADF until 1996. In that year, he resigned from the position of Archdruid but retained the lifelong title of ADF Archdruid Emeritus.

=== Musician and activist ===
A songwriter, singer, and recording artist, he produced two CDs of pagan music and numerous recorded lectures and panel discussions, produced and distributed by the Association for Consciousness Exploration. He lived in Rockland County, New York, and was a member of the Covenant of Unitarian Universalist Pagans (CUUPS).

Bonewits encouraged charity programs to help Neopagan seniors, and in January 2006 was the keynote speaker at the Conference On Current Pagan Studies at the Claremont Graduate University in Claremont, CA.

== Personal life ==
Bonewits was married five times. He was married to Rusty Elliot from 1973 to 1976. His second wife was Selene Kumin Vega, followed by marriage to Sally Eaton (1980 to 1985). His fourth wife was author Deborah Lipp, from 1988 to 1998. On July 23, 2004, he was married in a handfasting ceremony to Phaedra Heyman Bonewits, a former vice-president of the Covenant of Unitarian Universalist Pagans. At the time of the handfasting, the marriage was not yet legal because he had not yet been legally divorced from Lipp, although they had been separated for several years. Paperwork and legalities caught up on December 31, 2007, making Bonewitz and Phaedra legally married.

Bonewits' only child was born to Lipp in 1990.

== Illness and death ==
In 1990, Bonewits was diagnosed with eosinophilia-myalgia syndrome. The illness was a factor in his eventual resignation from the position of Archdruid of the ADF.

On October 25, 2009, Bonewits was diagnosed with a rare form of colon cancer, for which he underwent treatment. He died at home, on August 12, 2010, surrounded by his family.

== Accusations of sexual assault ==
In 2018, Moira Greyland (daughter of Marion Zimmer Bradley and Walter Breen) accused Bonewits of sexually abusing her when she was six years old. Greyland wrote in her book, 'The Last Closet: the Dark Side of Avalon':

Some people called him the Pagan pope […] I hated Isaac, and refused to be in the same room with him, even if the only way I could articulate my objections to him was to say 'he tickled me'.

In light of this accusation, ADF, the lead pagan organization that Issac Bonewits founded, removed his name from their website and repudiated him.

To preserve the health of our organization, we must cut out the blight that is Isaac Bonewits’ legacy. We sever the ties both historical and spiritual that bind us to him. For his actions against children, Isaac Bonewits will no longer be named as a beloved ancestor of ADF, nor is he welcome at our sacred fire.

May his memory and his dark actions fade with the rising of the sun.

== Contributions to Neopaganism ==
In his book Real Magic (1971), Bonewits proposed his "Laws of Magic". These "laws" are synthesized from a multitude of belief systems from around the world to explain and categorize magical beliefs within a cohesive framework. Many interrelationships exist, and some belief systems are subsets of others. This work was chosen by Dennis Wheatley in the 1970s to be part of his publishing project Library of the Occult.

Bonewits also coined much of the modern terminology used to articulate the themes and issues that affect the North American Neopagan community.

- Pioneered the modern usage of the terms "thealogy", "Paleo-Paganism", "Meso-Paganism", and numerous other retronyms.
- Possibly coined the term "Pagan Reconstructionism", though the communities in question would later diverge from his initial meaning.
- Founded Ar nDraiocht Fein, which was incorporated in 1990 in the state of Delaware as a U.S. 501(c)3 non-profit organization.
- Developed the Advanced Bonewits Cult Danger Evaluation Frame (ABCDEF).
- Coined the phrase "Never Again the Burning".
- Critiqued the Burning Times / Old Religion Murray thesis (in Bonewits's Essential Guide to Witchcraft and Wicca).
- In his book Real Magic (1971), Bonewits proposed his hypothesis on the Laws of Magic, which were then elaborated in his RPG supplement Authentic Thaumaturgy. The book makes it clear it is an adaptation of the ideas from Real Magic to gaming with the Laws presented being abbreviated from those in Real Magic.

== Bibliography ==
- Real Magic: An Introductory Treatise on the Basic Principles of Yellow Magic. (1972, 1979, 1989) Weiser Books ISBN 0-87728-688-4
- The Druid Chronicles (Evolved). (1976 Drunemeton Press, 2005 Drynemetum Press) (With Selene Kumin Vega, Rusty Elliot, and Arlynde d'Loughlan)
- Authentic Thaumaturgy. (With others) (1978 Chaosium, 1998 Steve Jackson Games) ISBN 1-55634-360-4
- Rites of Worship: A Neopagan Approach. (2003) Earth Religions Press ISBN 1-59405-501-7 OP
- Witchcraft: A Concise Guide or Which Witch Is Which?. (2003) Earth Religions Press ISBN 1-59405-500-9
- The Pagan Man: Priests, Warriors, Hunters, and Drummers. (2005) Citadel ISBN 0-8065-2697-1, ISBN 978-0-8065-2697-3
- Bonewits's Essential Guide to Witchcraft and Wicca. (2006) Citadel ISBN 0-8065-2711-0, ISBN 978-0-8065-2711-6
- Bonewits's Essential Guide to Druidism. (2006) Citadel ISBN 0-8065-2710-2, ISBN 978-0-8065-2710-9
- Real Energy: Systems, Spirits, And Substances to Heal, Change, And Grow. (2007) New Leaf ISBN 1-56414-904-8, ISBN 978-1-56414-904-6. Co-authored with Phaedra Bonewits.
- Neopagan Rites: A Guide to Creating Public Rituals that Work. (2007) Llewellyn ISBN 0-7387-1199-3, ISBN 978-0-7387-1199-7

== Discography ==
=== Music ===
- Be Pagan Once Again! – Isaac Bonewits & Friends (including Ian Corrigan, Victoria Ganger, and Todd Alan) (CD) (ACE/ADF)
- Avalon is Rising! – Real Magic (CD)(ACE/ADF)

=== Spoken word ===
- The Structure of Craft Ritual (ACE)
- A Magician Prepares (ACE)
- Programming Magical Ritual: Top-Down Liturgical Design (ACE)
- Druidism: Ancient & Modern (ACE)
- How Does Magic Work? (ACE)
- Rituals That Work (ACE)
- Sexual Magic & Magical Sex (with Deborah Lipp) (ACE)
- Making Fun of Religion (with Deborah Lipp) (ACE)

=== Panel discussions ===
- The Magickal Movement: Present & Future (with Margot Adler, Selena Fox, and Robert Anton Wilson) (ACE)
- Magick Changing the World, the World Changing Magick (with AmyLee, Selena Fox, Jeff Rosenbaum and Robert Anton Wilson) (ACE)
