= Ritual of oak and mistletoe =

Celtic religious ceremony

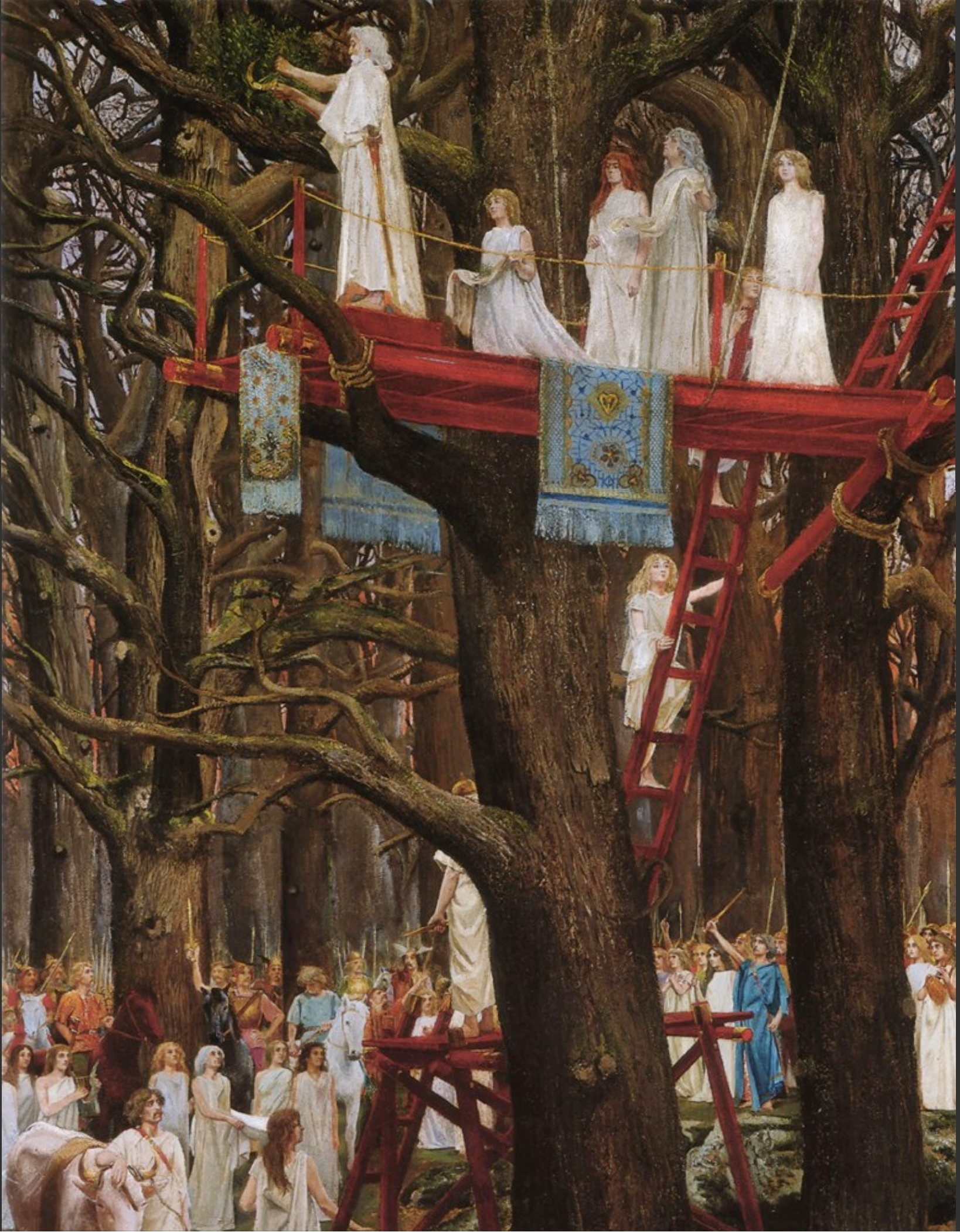
The oak and mistletoe ritual depicted by Henri-Paul Motte (1900)

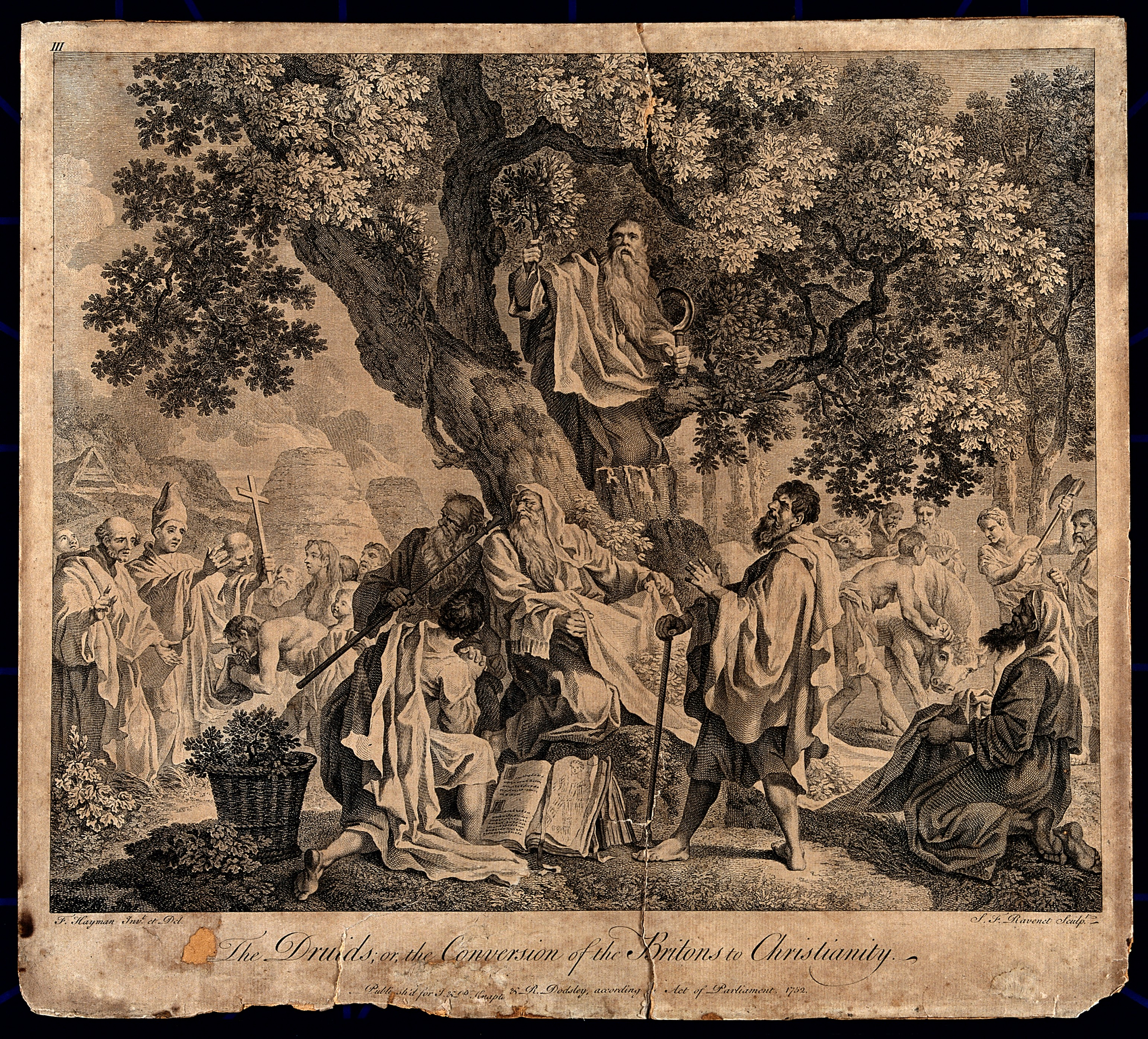
The druids; or the conversion of the Britons to Christianity (1752), depicting the oak and mistletoe ritual

The ritual of oak and mistletoe is a Celtic religious ceremony, in which white-clad druids climbed a sacred oak, cut down the mistletoe growing on it, sacrificed two white bulls and used the mistletoe to make an elixir to cure infertility and the effects of poison. The ritual, known from a single passage in Pliny's Natural History, has helped shape the image of the druid in the popular imagination.

== Account by Pliny the Elder ==
The only extant source for this ritual is a passage in the Natural History by Roman historian Pliny the Elder, written in the 1st century AD. Speaking of mistletoe, he writes:

We should not omit to mention the great admiration that the Gauls have for it as well. The druids – that is what they call their magicians – hold nothing more sacred than the mistletoe and a tree on which it is growing, provided it is a hard-timbered oak [robur].... Mistletoe is rare and when found it is gathered with great ceremony, and particularly on the sixth day of the moon.... Hailing the moon in a native word that means 'healing all things,' they prepare a ritual sacrifice and banquet beneath a tree and bring up two white bulls, whose horns are bound for the first time on this occasion. A priest arrayed in white vestments climbs the tree and, with a golden sickle, cuts down the mistletoe, which is caught in a white cloak. Then finally they kill the victims, praying to a god to render his gift propitious to those on whom he has bestowed it. They believe that mistletoe given in drink will impart fertility to any animal that is barren and that it is an antidote to all poisons.

While Pliny does not indicate the source on which he based this account, French archaeologist Jean-Louis Brunaux (fr) has argued for Posidonius of Rhodes, a polymath who flourished in the 1st century BC.

== Later influence and historiography ==
Miranda Aldhouse-Green has argued that, although Pliny is the only authority to mention this ceremony, the main elements of his account are all features of Celtic religion that are confirmed elsewhere; these include oak trees, mistletoe, ritual banqueting, the moon, and bull-sacrifice.

Pliny's account has largely contributed to the popular depiction of druids today, as white-clad wise men performing sacrifices in the forests and equipped with golden sickles.

Chateaubriand incorporated a dramatized version of Pliny's scene in his Les Martyrs, in which the druidess Veleda plays a part. In the Astérix comics, the druid Getafix, robed in white, is often depicted up in an oak tree cutting mistletoe with a golden sickle. The plot of an entire story, Asterix and the Golden Sickle, revolves around that theme.

== See also ==
- Celtic sacred trees
