= Strettweg cult wagon =

Bronze cult wagon from ca. 600 BC, found near Judenburg, Austria

Coordinates: 47°04′34″N 15°23′34″E

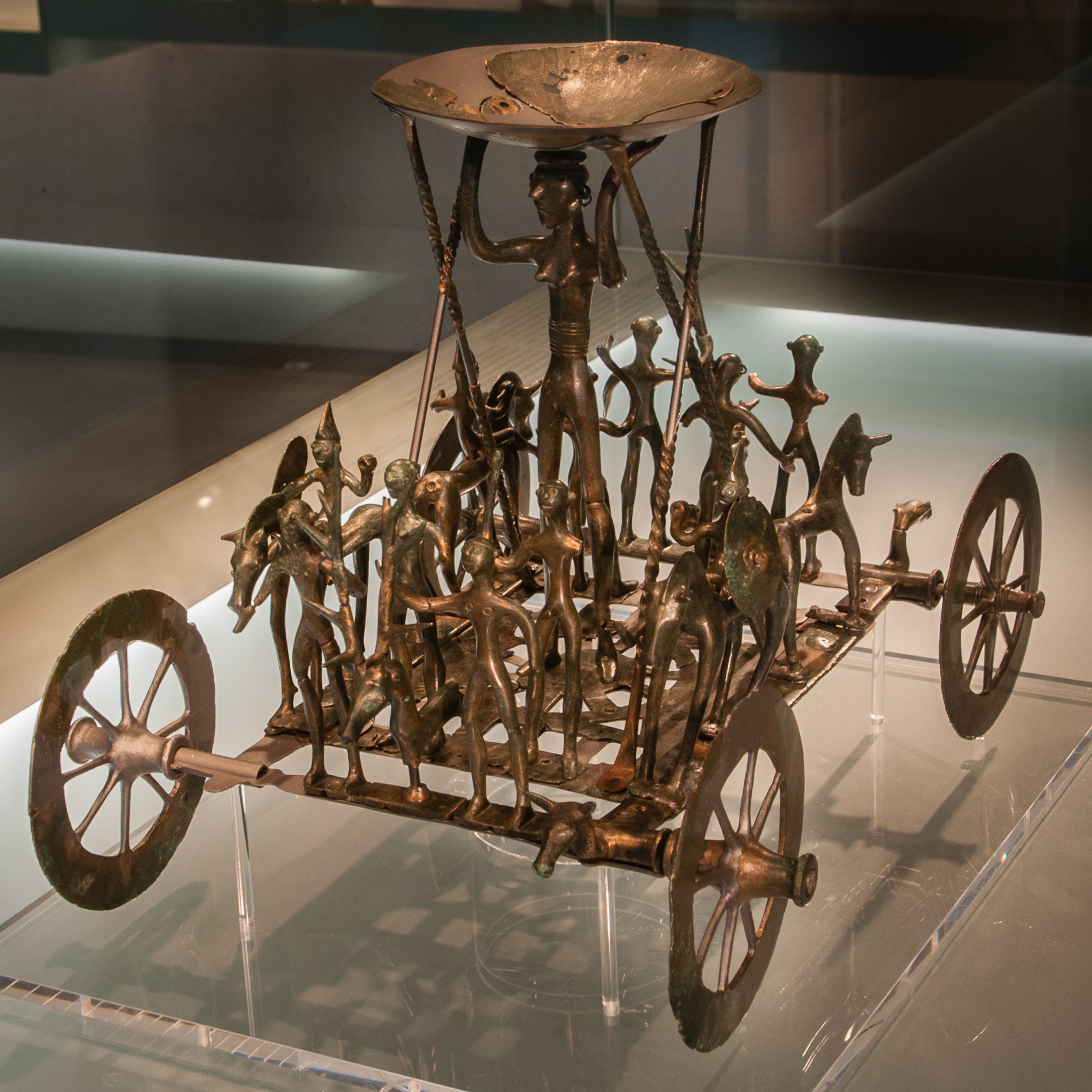
The Cult Wagon

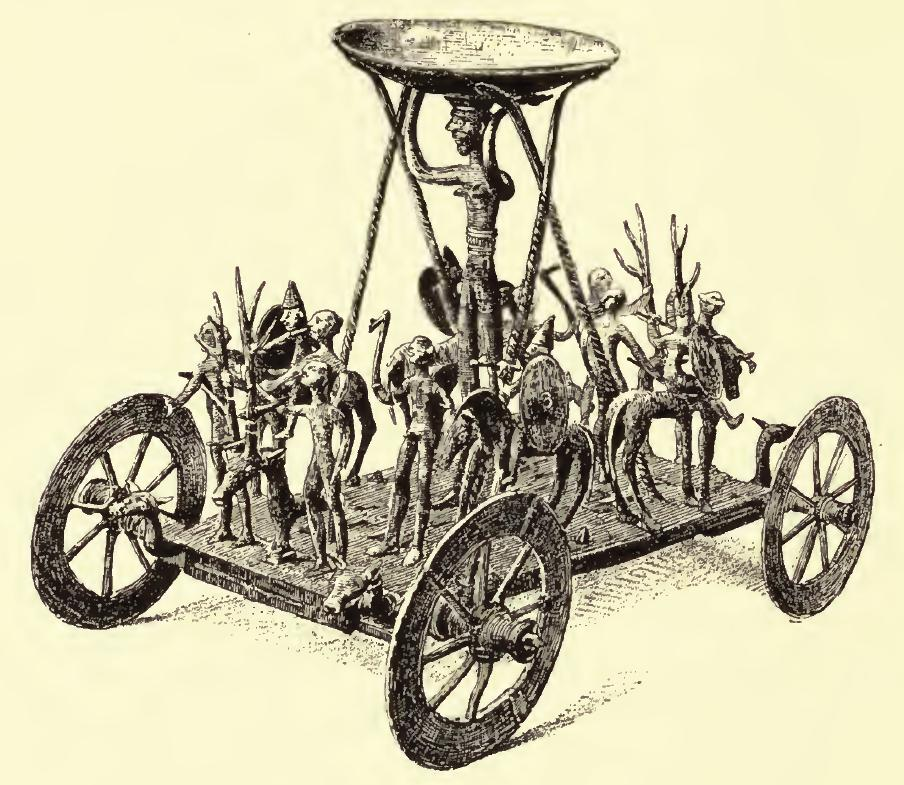
Cult Wagon of Strettweg as depicted in 1886 Jahrbuch des Kaiserlich Deutschen Archäologischen Instituts.

The Strettweg cult wagon, or Strettweg sacrificial wagon, or Strettweg chariot is a bronze cult wagon from ca. 600 BC, which was found as part of a princely grave of the Hallstatt culture in Strettweg near Judenburg, Austria in 1851. Besides the wagon, other grave goods, like jewelry, bronze amphorae, iron weapons, and horse tack were found.

The wagon consists of a square, open-worked base plate with four spoked wheels. A female figure approximately 32 centimetres (13 in) high extending her hands to touch the base of a large bowl with tall, X-shaped supports. Expert analysis has concluded that the bowl cannot be conclusively proven to originally have been part of the cult wagon and may be a later addition. The wagon also contains numerous human figures, both standing and mounted, as well as animals similar to deer and horses. The scene has been interpreted as a sacrifice. The wagon presumably served as a cult object for the consumption of a libation.

The wagon was restored in 2009 and is on display in the Universalmuseum Joanneum at Eggenberg Palace, Graz. A copy is on display in the museum in Judenburg.

According to Marjeta Šašel-Kos (2000), "A deer goddess similar to Artemis must have played an important role in pre-Celtic Noricum, as is indicated by the cult cart from Strettweg, from c. 600 B.C., which represents a goddess (or her priestess) who received deer as a sacrifice, i.e. a kind of a 'Great Nature Goddess'."

== Gallery ==
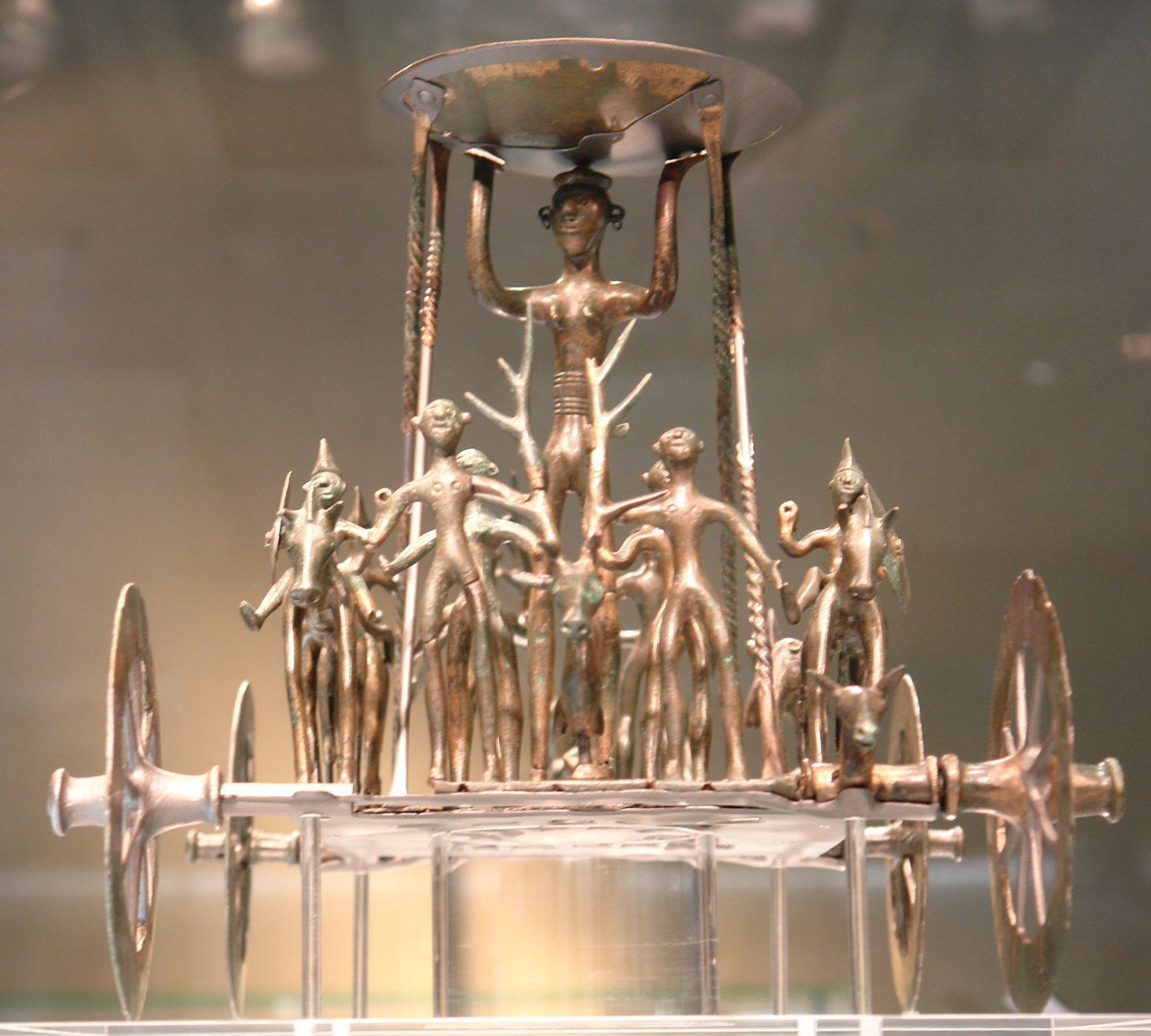

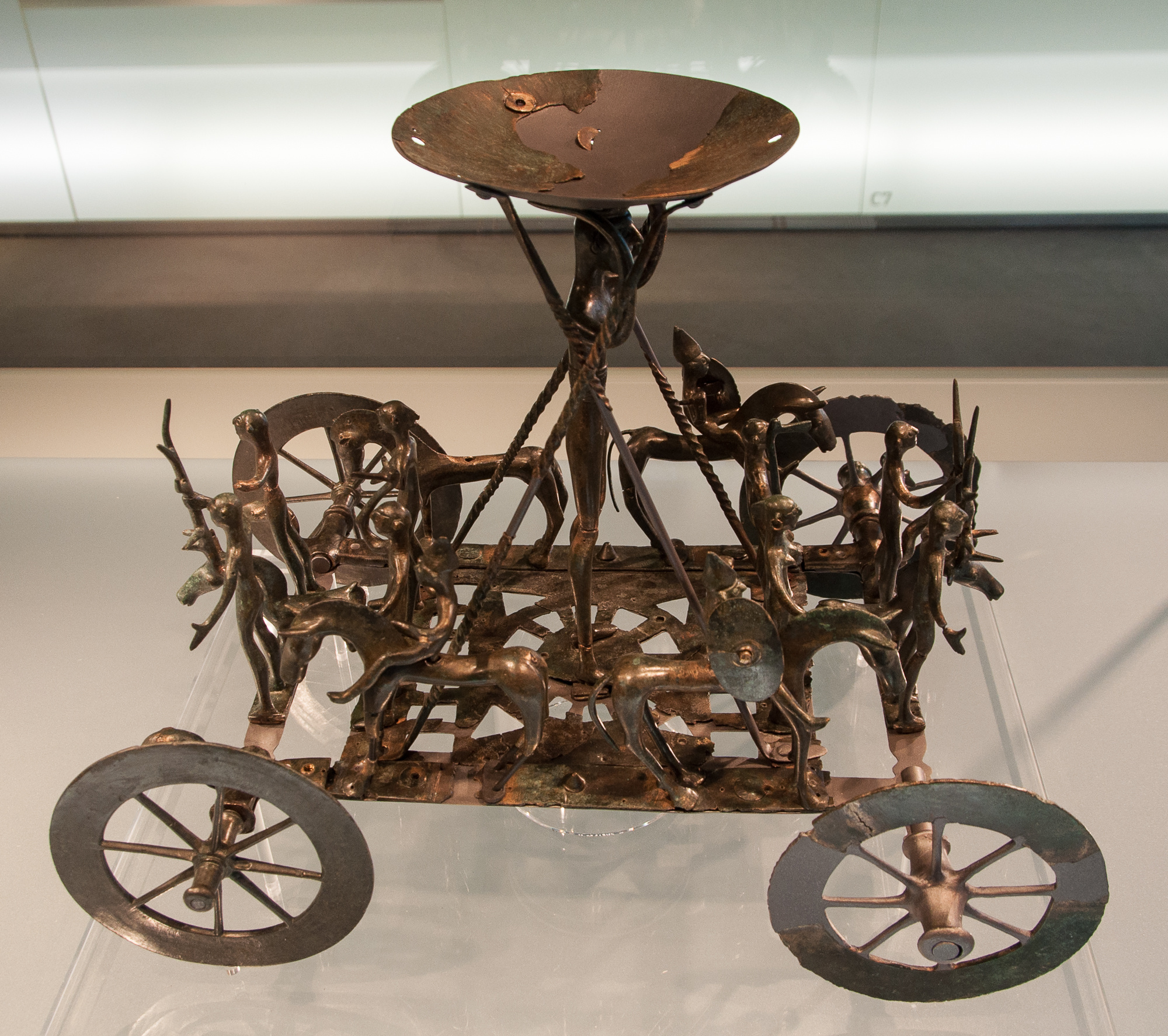

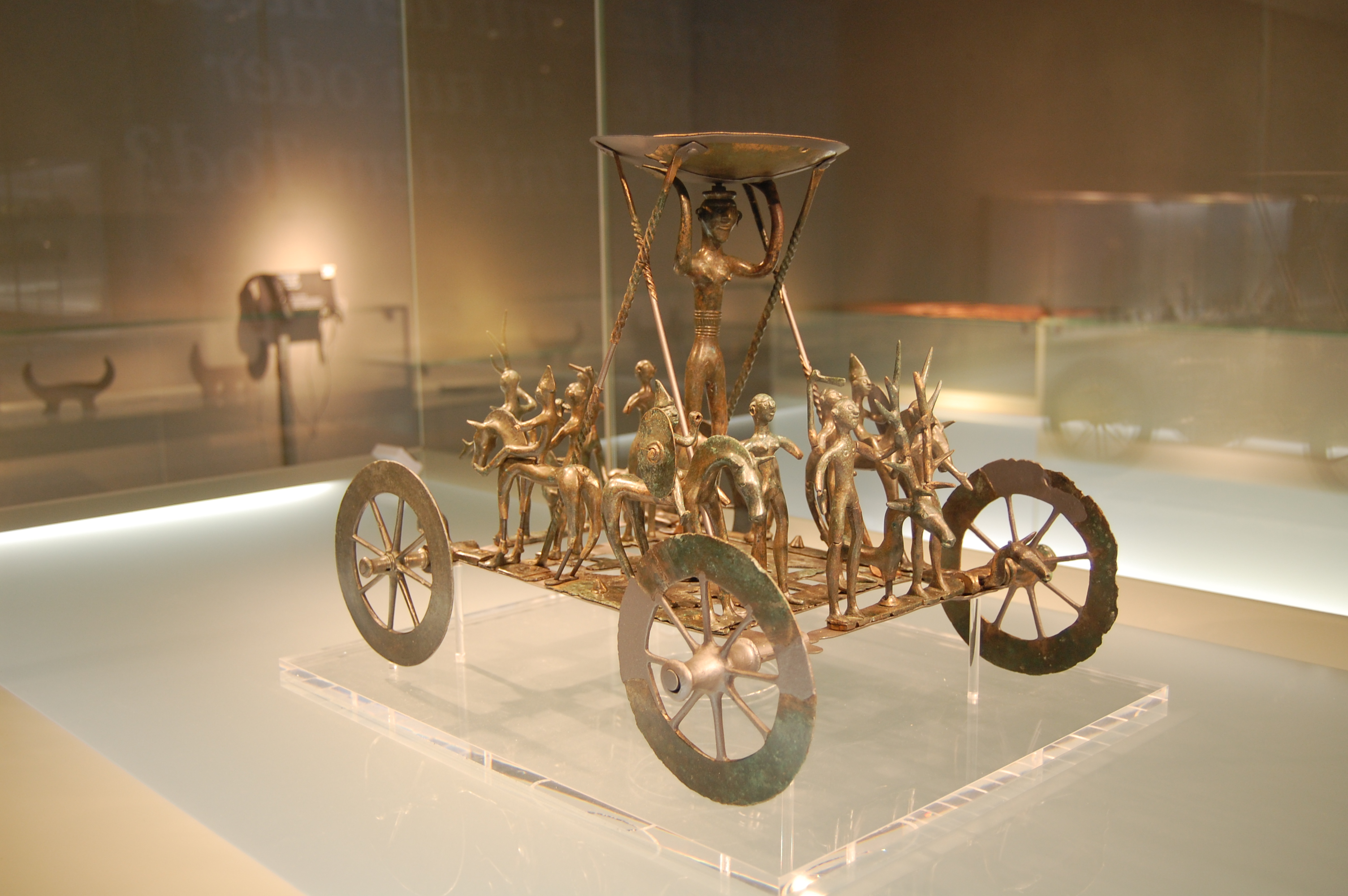

== Literature ==
- Markus Egg: Neues zum Fürstengrab von Strettweg. 1991.
- Markus Egg, Gerhard Stawinoga: Das hallstattzeitliche Fürstengrab von Strettweg bei Judenburg in der Obersteiermark. Römisch-Germanisches Zentralmuseum, Forschungsinstitut für Vor- und Frühgeschichte, 1996, ISBN 3-88467-036-0
