= Starwood Festival =

American annual neopagan festival

The Starwood Festival is a seven-day New Age neopagan and world music festival. It takes place every July in the United States. The Starwood Festival is a camping event which holds workshops on a variety of subjects. There are also live musical performances, rituals, bonfires, multimedia presentations and social activities. It is a clothing optional event, and skyclad attendance is common.

== History ==
The Starwood Festival was founded in 1981 by the Chameleon Club, a recognized student organization at Case Western Reserve University, which later founded the Association for Consciousness Exploration (ACE). It has been operated by ACE since 1983 under its co-directors, Jeff Rosenbaum and Joe Rothenberg. It featured entertainment, public ceremonies and rituals, and classes on subjects such as sensory isolation, Kirlian photography, Neopaganism, shamanism, Wicca, holistic health, tarot divination, Thelema, and past life regression.

The first Starwood was held July 24–26, 1981 at Coopers Lake Campground, the same site as the Society for Creative Anachronism's Pennsic War in Slippery Rock, Pennsylvania. From 1982 through 1985 it was held at Devil's Den Park in New Philadelphia, Ohio, a former state park run by Whispering Winds Nudist Camp. In 1986 and 1987 it was held at Bear Creek Amphitheatre (part of Bear Creek Resort Ranch KOA) in East Sparta, Ohio, and at Echo Hills Ski Resort in Logan, Ohio (on the Buckeye Trail) in 1988 and 1989. The event moved to Brushwood Folklore Center, a private campground in Sherman, New York. from 1990 through 2009. Since 2010, Starwood has been held at Wisteria Campground in Pomeroy, Ohio.

The event began as a weekend festival, and grew over the years to a seven-day event. Attendance has grown from 185 in the first year to peak at around 1800 people in 2002, and has stayed between 1500 and 1650 since 1999. Since 1982, Starwood has been a clothing optional event, and skyclad attendance is common.

== Activities ==
Starwood offers approximately 150 workshops, on topics including alternative lifestyles, political & spiritual activism, spiritual traditions, consciousness-altering technologies and substances (such as biofeedback, sensory-isolation, mind machines, entheogenic and other mind-altering substances), martial arts & movement systems, history, magic, folklore, art & music, metaphysics and environmental issues.

There are classes on the drumming and dancing styles of Africa, South America, Ireland, the Middle East and elsewhere. All-night drummers' bonfires are held each night of the event in at least two locations: the "Paw Paw Patch" for larger drums such as djembes, and the "DidgeDome" for smaller drums such as bongos and tablas, accompanied by didgeridoos and quieter instruments. There are concerts held every lunchtime, dinnertime, and evening, and all-night multi-media enhanced parties in an inflatable structure called the "PufferDome" and in an adjacent area called the "G-Spot". Starwood provides child care and children's classes and programs in a playground area called "Kids' Village", and a schedule of classes and activities for teenagers. There are several areas devoted to multi-cultural ceremonies and rituals, and a non-Native sweat lodge. Friday night features a multi-media presentation, (often including fireworks, lasers, fire dancing, and synchronized music), and on the final night a torchlight procession leads to a huge bonfire.

== People ==
Some specific groups whose members regularly appear at and attend Starwood include the Church of All Worlds (CAW), the Church of the SubGenius, the Neo-Druidic group Ar nDraiocht Fein (ADF), and various Neopagan covens and organizations
