= Reformed Druids of North America =

Druid organization in North America

Symbol of the RDNA

The Reformed Druids of North America (RDNA) is an American Neo-Druidic organization. It was formed in 1963 at Carleton College, Northfield, Minnesota, as a humorous protest against the college's required attendance of religious services. This original congregation is called the Carleton Grove, sometimes the Mother Grove. There are over 40 groves and proto-groves of the RDNA throughout the United States and Canada.

== History ==
=== Origins ===
A liberal arts college, Carleton had been founded by the Congregational Church, but by the 1960s had become a non-denominational institution. Nonetheless, the student handbook still held that "attendance is required at the College Service of Worship or at the Sunday Evening Program or at any regularly organized service of public worship." A number of students, including David Fisher, David Frangquist, Howard Cherniack, Jan Johnson and Norman Nelson thought this rule objectionable, and formed their own religious group, the RDNA, in protest, rather than attend any of the extant ones. The RDNA held meetings near the college athletic fields, and marked the obligatory "chapel slips" correspondingly. As Nelson later explained, "The sole motive was to protest the requirement, not to try for alternatives for worship... There was never any intention to mock any religion; it was not intended that RDNA should compete with or supplant any faith. We tried to write a service which could be attended 'in good faith' by anyone."

The RDNA believed that pain of hypocrisy would force the college authorities to validate their activities as public worship. Instead, the dean of men ignored the group, neither accepting the chapel slips nor disciplining the members. But the dean of women chose to accept the slips that the RDNA's two female members submitted. After extended discussion with the Druids, the college recognized its untenable position, and dropped the religious requirement in June 1964. The college's President Nason and his wife attended the final RDNA ceremony that academic year, overlooking a ritual consumption of whiskey that technically violated college rules.

But in challenging the college's chapel requirement, the founders had unwittingly fostered a rewarding environment for spiritual exploration. Many Druids had come to value the movement in their lives, and the founders were stunned to discover that demand for Druid services continued even after the college requirement disappeared.

== Principles ==
Reformed Druidism emphasizes its lack of institutionalized dogma. Each Druid is required only to adopt these basic tenets:

- One of the many ways in which the object of Man's search for religious truth can be found is through Nature.
- Nature, being one of the primary concerns in Man's life and struggle, and being one of the objects of Creation, is important to Man's spiritual quests.

The original group was not neo-pagan—most identified themselves as Jewish, Christian, agnostic, atheist, or as members of other faiths—and the movement still includes many who do not consider themselves neo-pagan.

Chas S. Clifton, an academic scholar of Neopaganism, made several suggestions as to where the early RDNA founders may have got their ideas about Druidry from, noting that there were British Druid groups such as the Ancient Druid Order operating at the time, who held annual ceremonies at the megalithic monument of Stonehenge in Wiltshire, attracting much media attention. Accompanying this, there were ideas about the ancient druids to be found in the "American literary consciousness", where they appeared as guardians of the natural world in the Romanticist poetry of Philip Freneau.

Clifton's speculations contrast with the actual motivations for Reformed Druidism. In fact, at a meeting in Fisher's dormitory room about the religious requirement, Cherniack volunteered that his family had always responded to questions about religion by claiming to be Druids, and the group adopted this moniker. When someone pointed out that none of the group knew anything at all about Druids, the suggestion quickly arose that the new group call itself the Reformed Druids of North America, so it could create tenets and rituals out of whole cloth without having to know or care anything about any previous Druids.

== Ritual ==
In accord with the Basic Tenets, Reformed Druid worship is directed toward Nature. Services involve gathering in a wooded place periodically (the original group met weekly during warm weather) and on the festival days of Northern European Pagan tradition. Services typically include:

- The singing of religious songs.
- The performance of ceremonial chanting.
- Prayers and meditations.

The written liturgy calls for a "sacrifice of life". An early disagreement, recounted in The Druid Chronicles, was resolved by limiting the sacrifice to plant life, whence the term "Reformed" was adopted as part of the group's name.

== Literature ==
While Reformed Druids are considered the least organized and most playful Druids, their literature is perhaps the most extensively produced and archived among modern Druid groups in America. It is estimated that it would take 100 full days to read all 7000 pages of the genre. Despite the sheer volume, it is quite possible and common for prominent members to participate actively in a Grove or a conference for years without having read more than a few dozen pages, as the oral and living traditions are also quite vital and nuanced.

The written traditions were mostly composed by members of the Third Order priesthood, but the writers do not claim divine inspiration. An understanding or agreement with the written material is generally not required for any office or ordination, but is more commonly browsed by members entering the second or higher orders, or when assuming office responsibilities in a Grove.

The literature is notably non-dogmatic, eclectic, leaning towards a philosophic rather than a magical focus, and often written "tongue-in-cheek", with authors tending to poke fun at themselves. Reformed Druidic literature has been an almost entirely open literature, unlike many fraternal or mystical Druid organizations that restrict material to initiates. Most earlier publications were limited in distribution, primarily due to the high cost of publication in the 1960s and 1970s, but were available upon request.

While generally well-researched and crafted, Reformed Druidic materials are not intended as serious academic works and are intended for their own audience. Except for a few pamphlets, these materials have not been used for proselytizing. Despite the Reformed Druids' lack of missionary impulse, many of the literary traits from Reformed Druidism were transferred to later groups that trace their origins to the RDNA. This is due in large part to Isaac Bonewits' fervent missionary and publishing efforts through newsletters, member guides, seminary materials, and popular books from 1971 to 2010.

The literature of the major works have various distinct genres, including: the writing of epistles, drafting liturgies, collecting materials for meditative use, historiography, calendar and protocol guides, research tracts on modern and ancient Druidry, council records, oral histories, local event chronographies, teaching guides for new members, recruitment materials, terminology references, bardic material collections, and even game design.

In addition to the major printed collections that have grown exponentially larger every decade, several newsletters and magazines have been published, and websites and online talk groups have been available since the early 1990s. In other media, members of the Reform have produced full-length movies, albums, and an animated series.

Members of the Reformed Druid priesthood (such as Isaac Bonewits and more recently, John Michael Greer) have published short stories, novels, and several books on religion, including modern Druidism, even though those works are not directly related to Reformed Druidism.

=== Major works ===
- 1964 The Druid Chronicles (Reformed)
- 1976 The Druid Chronicles (Evolved) (first edition)
- 1982 Druid Compendium (project aborted when ADF was founded)
- 1996 A Reformed Druid Anthology
- 2004 The Carleton Druid Collection
- 2004 The Druid Chronicles (Evolved), third edition
- 2004 A Reformed Druid Anthology 2 (Main Volume)
- 2005 A Reformed Druid Anthology 2 (Green Books Volume)
- 2005 A Reformed Druid Anthology 2 (Magazines Volume).
- 2009 Unofficial Welcome Pamphlet (first edition)
- 2010 The Druid's Path (first edition)

=== Minor works ===
- 1966 Black Book of Liturgy
- 1966 Green Book of Meditations (first edition)
- 1974 Green Book of Meditations (second edition)
- 1994 Orange Book of Apocrypha

=== Newsletters ===
- 1977–1981 The Druid Chronicler
- 1978–1981 The Pentalpha Journal
- 1982–1991 A Druid Missal-Any
- 1994 News from the Hill of Three Oaks
- 1994 The Standing Stone
- 2000–2008 A Druid Missal-Any
- 2003–2012 The Druid's Egg
- 2008–Present The Druid Inquirer

=== Movies ===
- 1995 Gatorr: The Fighting Rabbit
- 2011–2012 Desperate Druids, a web series

== Archdruids ==
- David Fisher (Spring 1963–Spring 1964)
- Norman Nelson (Spring 1964–Fall 1964)
- David Frangquist (Fall 1964–Spring 1966)
- Gary Zempel (Spring 1966–Spring 1967)
- Thomas Carlisle (Spring 1967–Spring 1968)
- Marta Peck (Spring 1968–Fall 1968)
- Steven Savitzky (Fall 1968–Spring 1969)
- Richard Shelton (Spring 1969–Spring 1971)
- Glenn McDavid (Spring 1971–Spring 1972)
- Renata Seidel (Spring 1972–Spring 1973)
- Steven Corey (Spring 1973–Summer 1974)
- Diana Erbe (Summer 1974–Spring 1976)
- Donald Morrison (Spring 1976–Spring 1978)
- Susan Olin (Spring 1978–Spring 1979)
- Katya Luomala (Spring 1979–Spring 1980)
- Heidi Schultz (Spring 1980 only)
- Robert Nieman (Spring 1982–Spring 1984)
- Thomas Lane (Spring 1982–Spring 1984)
- Margaret Ross (Spring 1984–Spring 1985)
- Alice Cascorbi (1986–1988?)
- Heiko Koester (1986–1989?)
- Jan Schlamp (late 1980s)
- Carron Perry (1986–1988?)
- Tino Thompson (late 1980s)
- Branden Schield (1986–1989?)
- Joanne Madnt (late 1980s)
- Heather Gruenberg (1988–1992?)
- John Nauert (1988–1992?)
- Andea Davis (Fall 1992–Spring 1993)
- Michael Schading (Spring 1993–Spring 1994)
- Rebecca Hrobak (Triple Archdruidcy Triumvirate) (Spring 1994–Spring 1996)
- Anne Graham (Triple Archdruidcy Triumvirate) (Spring 1995–Spring 1996)
- Michelle Curtis (Triple Archdruidcy Triumvirate) (Spring 1995–Spring 1997)
- Irony Sade (Spring 1996–Spring 1999)
- David Coil (honorary) (Spring 1996–Spring 1999)
- Michelle Hajder (Fall 1997–Spring 2001)
- Amanda Bradley (Fall 1997?–Spring 2000)
- Chrissie Phelps (2nd) (Spring 1999–Fall 2000)
- Chloe Flynn (Spring 1999–Spring 2001)
- Merri-Beth Weber (Fall 2001–Spring 2001)
- Ehren Vaugn (Spring 1999–Spring 2002)
- Chris Middleton (2nd) (Spring 1999–Spring 2002)
- Stephen Crimmins (Spring 2002–Spring 2004)
- Hazel Corwin Troost (Fall 2002–Spring 2005)
- William Reckner (2nd) (Fall 2004–Spring 2005)
- Ian Hill (Spring 2005–Spring 2007?)
- Allison Smith (Fall 2005–Spring 2007?)
- Daniel Lessin (Spring 2007–Spring 2009)
- Avery Morrow (Spring 2008–Spring 2010)
- Beksahn Jang (Spring 2010–Spring 2011)
- Laura McCreary (Fall 2011–Spring 2012)
- Austen McBain (Spring 2012)
- Tina Chen (2nd) (Fall 2012–Spring 2013)
- Matt Jaquette (2nd) (Spring 2013–Spring 2014)
- Anna Smith (Fall 2014–Spring 2016)
- Rebecca Stover (2nd) (Fall 2016–2018)
- John Scott (Fall 2017–2018)
- Daniel Quintero (Fall 2018–Spring 2020)
- Jo Berlage (Co-Arch Druid) (Fall 2020–Spring 2021)
- Sam Anderson (Co-Arch Druid) (Fall 2020–Spring 2021)
- Hannah Piper (Fall 2022–Spring 2023)
- Austin Skoda (Fall 2023–Spring 2025)
- Leo Besen (Spring 2025–)
