= Museum of Gloucester =

Main museum of the city of Gloucester, formerly named "City Museum & Art Gallery"

Coordinates: 51.8635°N 2.2445°W

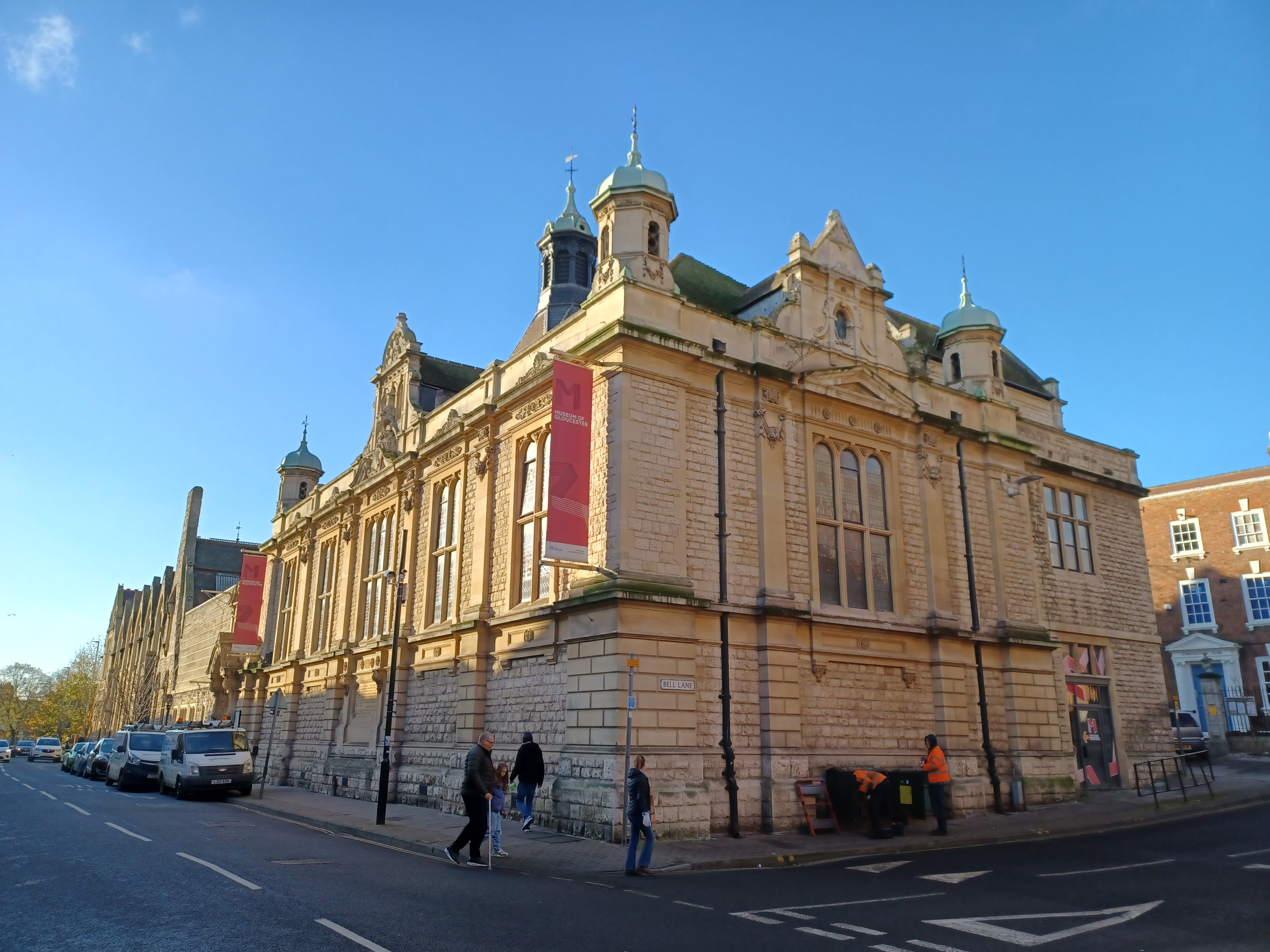
Museum of Gloucester

The Museum of Gloucester in Brunswick Road is the main museum in the city of Gloucester, England. It was extensively renovated following a large National Heritage Lottery Fund grant, and reopened on Gloucester Day, 3 September 2011.

In March 2016, the museum rebranded itself; it used to be called the Gloucester City Museum & Art Gallery.

Gloucester Life is a smaller museum in Westgate Street, dealing with the social history of Gloucestershire.

== Origins ==
The museum opened on 12 March 1860 as a private venture in three rooms at The Black Swan, provided rent-free by the poet Sydney Dobell. In 1896 the Corporation of the City of Gloucester took over the venture.

== The building ==
The Victorian building, in the early Renaissance style, inspired by the work of T.G. Jackson, is Grade II listed by English Heritage. It was originally the Price Memorial Hall of the Gloucester Science and Art Society, built for Margaret Price as a memorial to her husband William Edwin Price in 1893, and designed by F.S. Waller. The Corporation of the City of Gloucester took over the building as the City Museum & Art Gallery in 1902.

Originally only on the ground floor, a first floor was added in 1958 which was opened by the archaeologist Sir Mortimer Wheeler.

== Collections ==
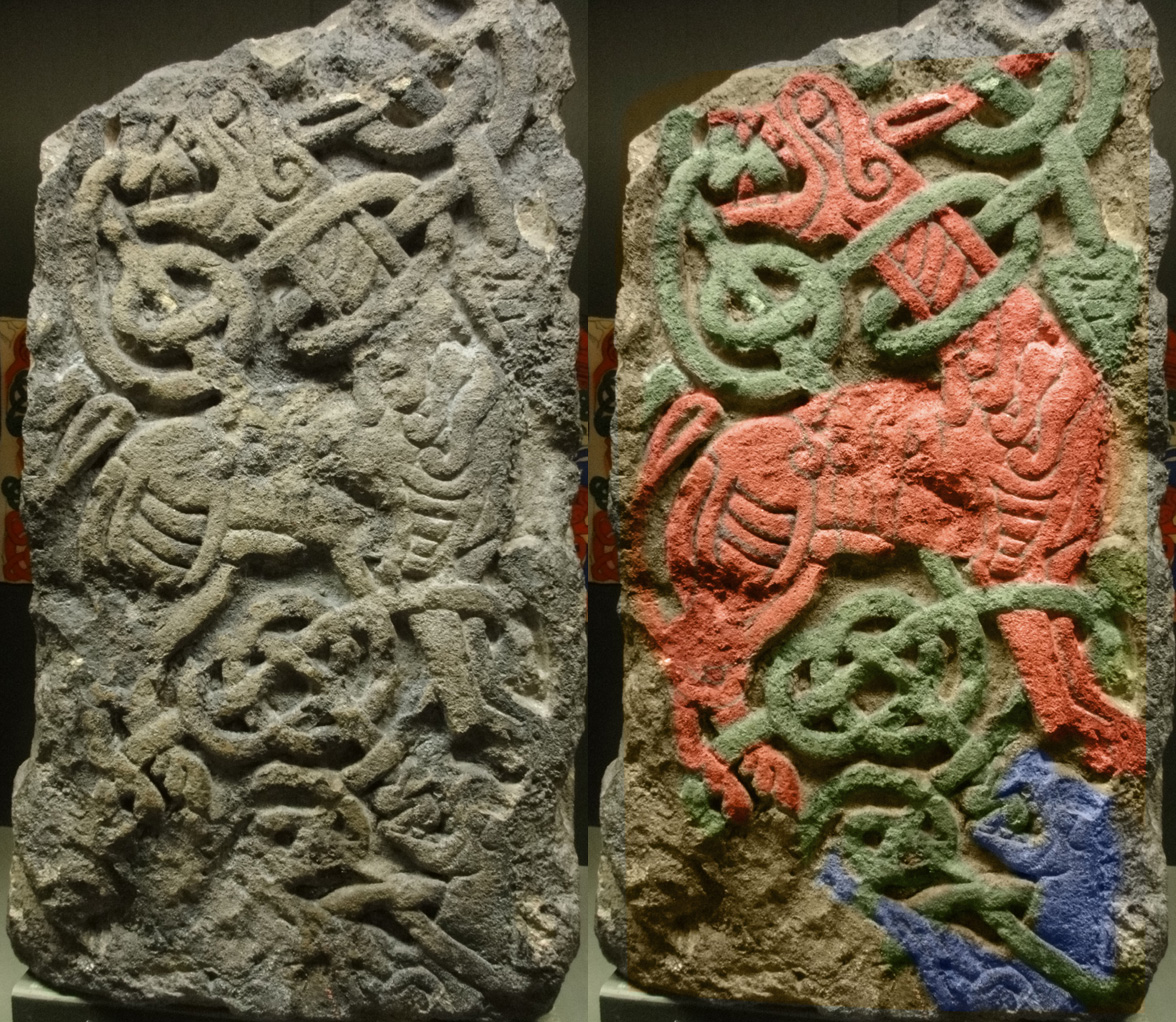
A fragment from an Anglo-Saxon Cross from St. Oswald's Priory in the museum. (False colourised version on the right.)

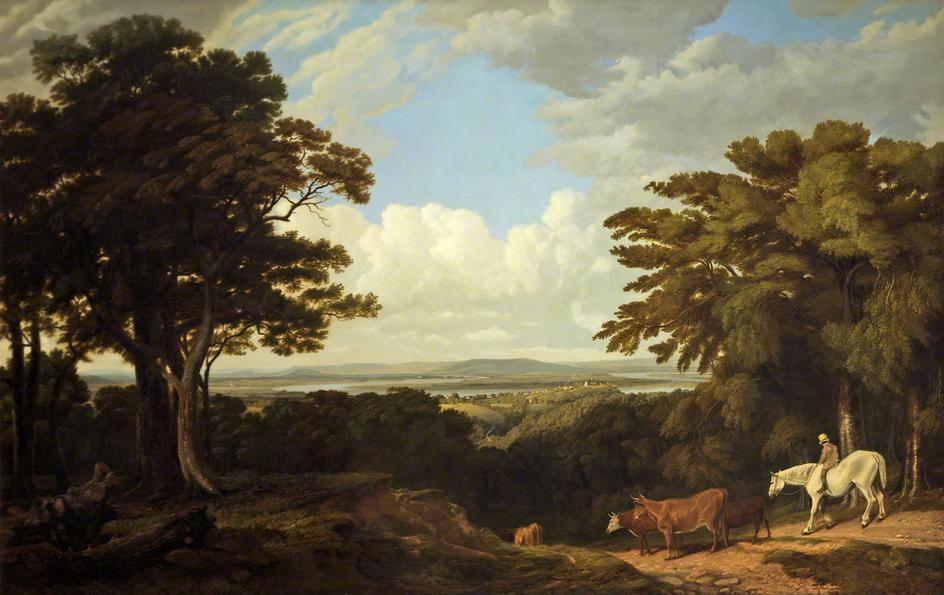
Newnham-on-Severn from Dean Hill by William Turner, acquired for the museum in 1977 with help from The Art Fund.

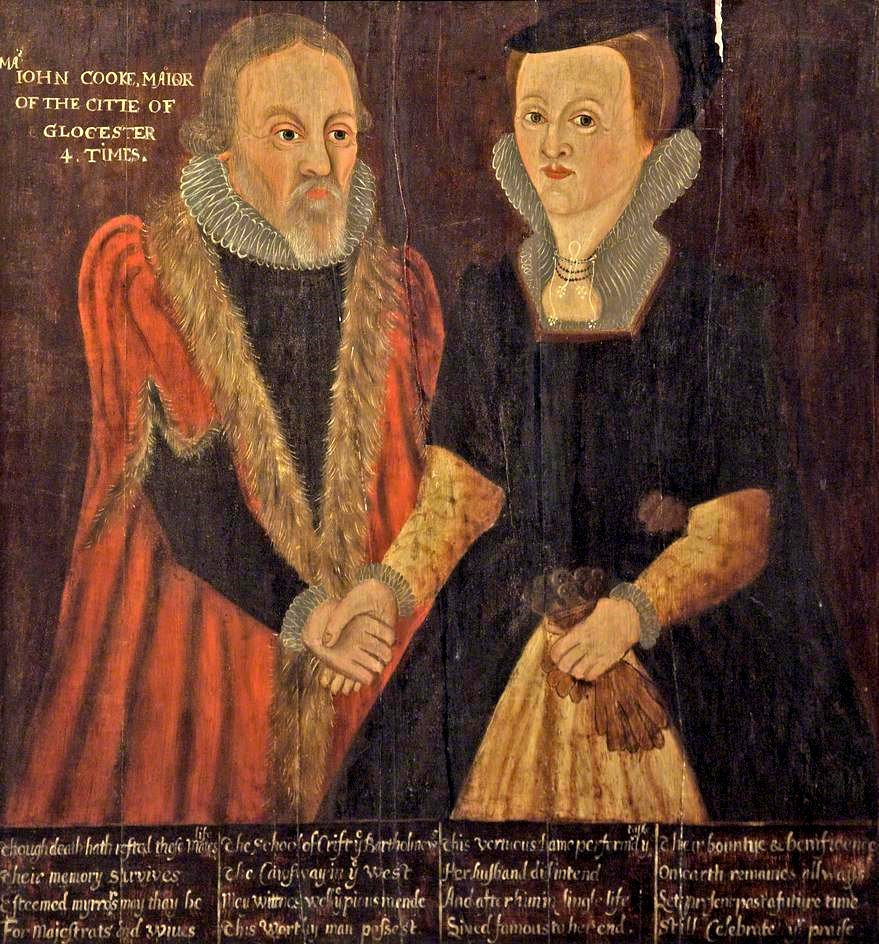
John and Joan Cooke by an unknown artist. Joan Cooke founded The Crypt School after her husband's death.

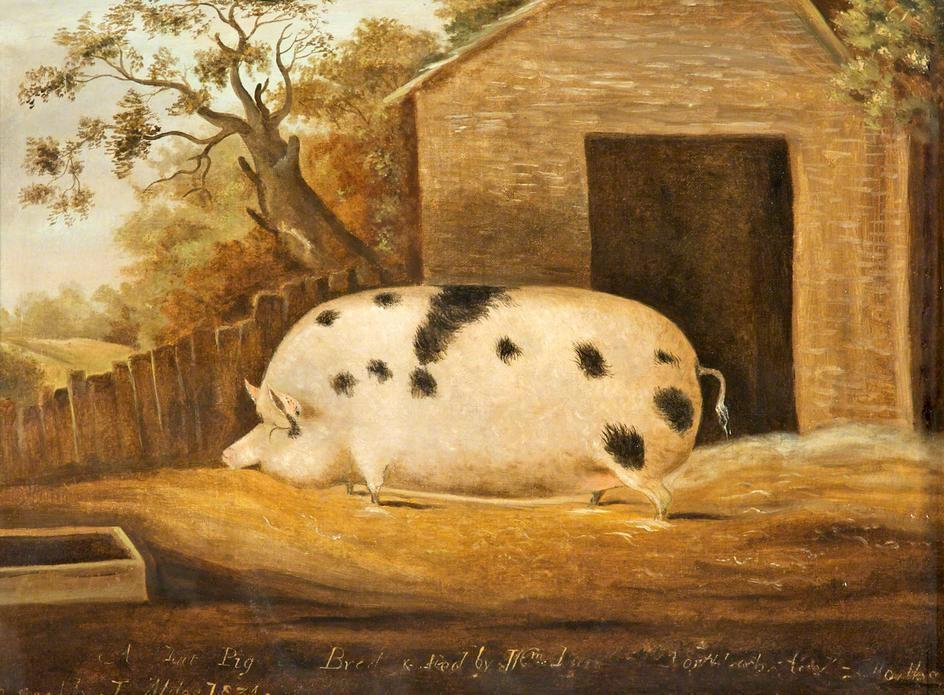
An 1834 painting of a Gloucestershire Old Spot pig in the museum's art collection. Said to be the largest pig ever bred in Britain.

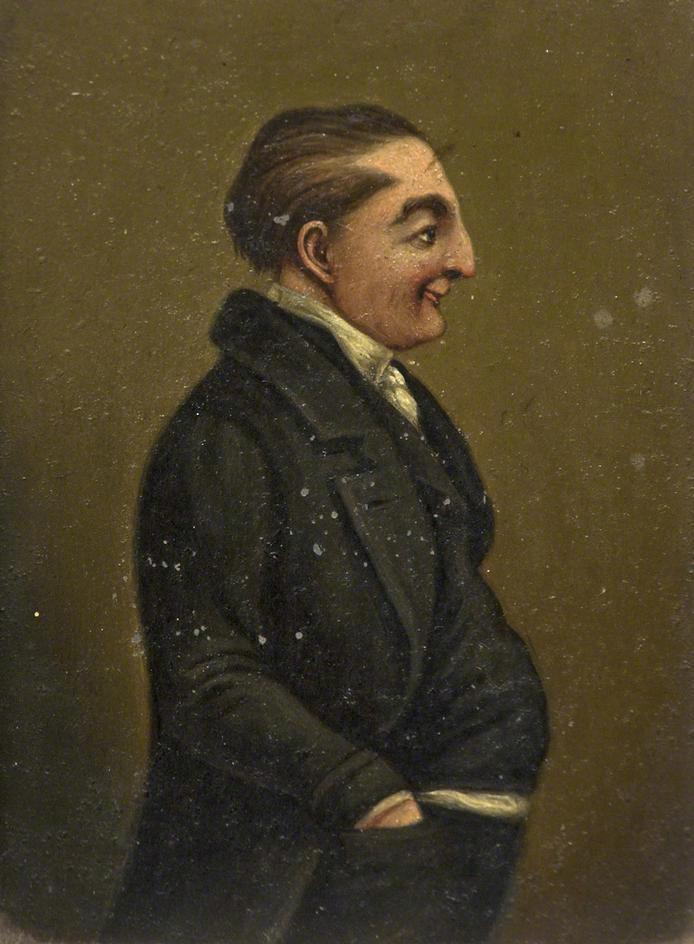
A miniature of Jemmy Wood, the famous Gloucester Miser, from the art collection.

Objects in the museum include:

- Dinosaur skeletons.
- Archaeology, including the Rufus Sita Tombstone, the Iron Age Birdlip Mirror found in 1879. and Bon Marché head, found in 1934.
- Natural history objects.
- Roman and mediaeval artefacts, including the Gloucester tabula set, a rare 11th or 12th century board game.
- Fine and decorative art items, including Delftware, Staffordshire figurines and Arts and Crafts Bowls by Alfred and Louise Powell.
- Queen Anne furniture.
- Local history items including items relating to the Gloucester Railway Carriage & Wagon Company and a bust of local Methodist preacher George Whitefield.

== Art collection ==
The art collection includes about 300 paintings including works by J. M. W. Turner and Thomas Gainsborough as well as a painting of Oliver Cromwell without his famous warts.

In 1977, the collection acquired a landscape of Newnham-on-Severn from Dean Hill by William Turner of Oxford with help from The Art Fund.

Gloucester Regent magazine March 1987 p2-6 discusses the controversial painting of dog excrement on a silver platter. However local artists praised its daring content.

== Activities ==
In 1976, excavations by the museum's Excavation Unit at St. Oswald's Priory yielded important new finds relating to the Saxon minster founded by Æthelred, Ealdorman of Mercia and his wife Æthelflæd in the 890s.

== Selected publications ==
- Sovereigns Of England Elizabeth I - Elizabeth II an Exhibition Held In The Wheatstone Hall Gloucester 1953. 1953.
- Ten treasures of the City Museums Gloucester, 1860-1960. 1960.
- Rhodes, J.F. Catalogue Of Romano-British Sculptures In The Gloucester City Museum. 1964.
- Wellington, Robert. Hubert Wellington memorial exhibition: An exhibition of paintings & drawings by Hubert Wellington, 1879-1967. 1968.
- Frith, Brian. Twelve Portraits of Gloucester Benefactors. 1972. ISBN 0-903340-00-3
- Taylor, John Neufville. Fishing on the Lower Severn. 1974. ISBN 0-903340-01-1
- Whiting, J.R.S. Gloucester Besieged: The story of a Roundhead city 1640-1660. 1975. (2nd edition 1984)
- Heighway, Carolyn M. Ancient Gloucester: The story of the Roman and medieval city. 1976. ISBN 0-903340-04-6
- Heighway, Carolyn M. The East Gate of Gloucester. 1980. ISBN 0-903340-06-2
- The Golden Age of Richard III: City Museum & Art Gallery, Brunswick Rd., Gloucester: 2 July-1 October 1983: An Exhibition on the Twin Themes of Richard III and the Mediaeval Town. 1983.
- Morris, Christopher. Farming in Gloucestershire, 1800-1914. 1984. ISBN 0-903340-07-0
- Collins, Chris. Robinswood Hill Geology Trail. 1985.
- Watkins, Malcolm J. Golden Age of Richard III. 1985. ISBN 0-903340-10-0
- Watkins, Malcolm J. Gloucester: The Normans and Domesday. 1985. ISBN 0-903340-09-7
- Morris, Christopher. Gloucester Folk Museum. 1986. ISBN 0-903340-11-9
- Watkins, Malcolm J. March of Rome: Roman Soldier AD.50-150. 1987. ISBN 0-903340-13-5
- Cox, Nigel G. Gloucester Folk Museum: A Guide to the Buildings. 1987. ISBN 0-903340-12-7
- Atkin, Malcolm. History Under Our Feet: Work of the Gloucester Excavation Unit. 1988. ISBN 0-903340-14-3
- Dartnall, D.L. The great Gloucestershire dinosaur discovery. 1990.

== See also ==
- List of museums in Gloucestershire
