= Gloucester tabula set =

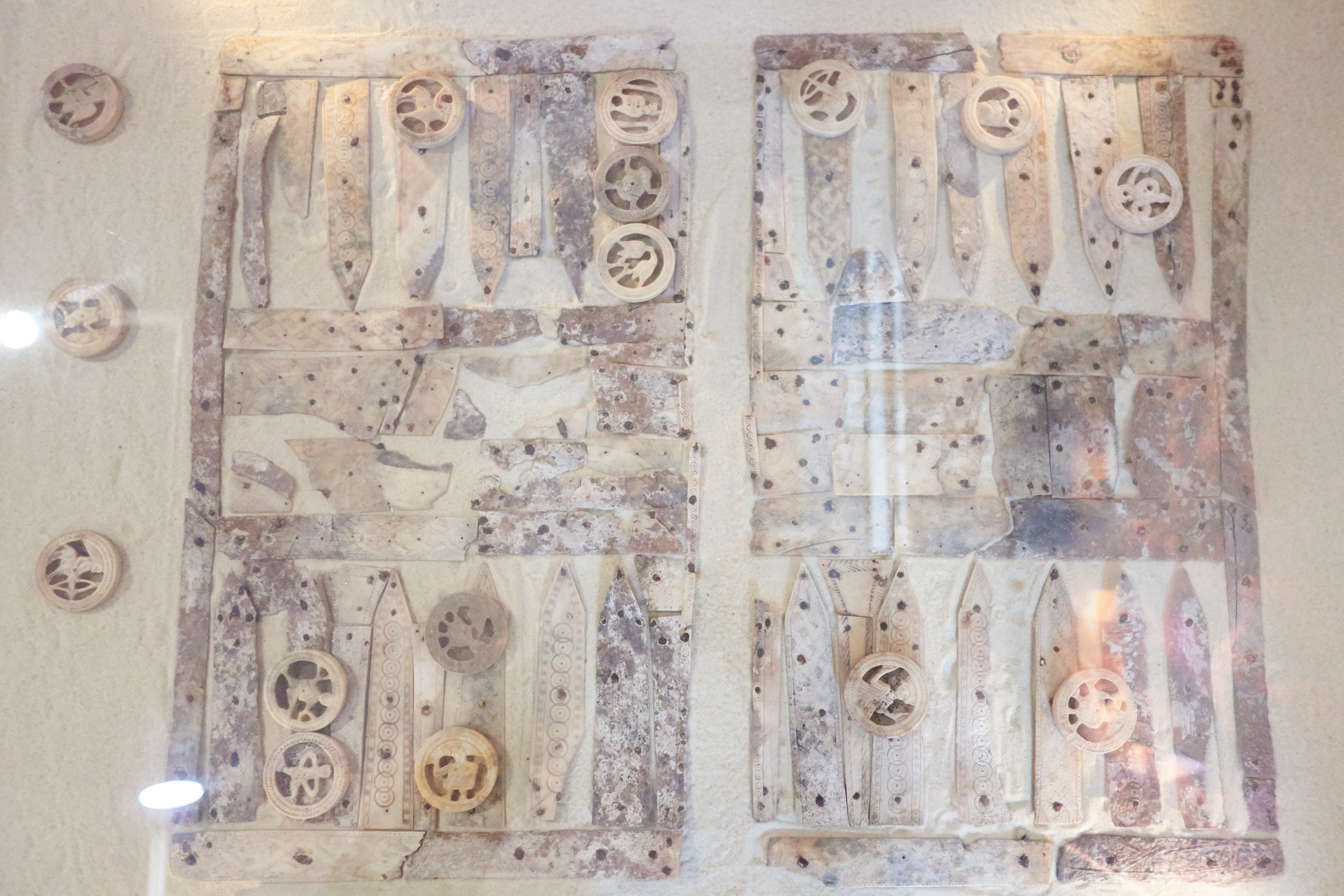
- Material: Bone
- Size: Approx. 450 × 600mm (board), pieces 45mm
- Created: 11th century, or 1100-20.
- Discovered: 1983; Gloucester; 51.8643°N 2.2502°W
- Present location: Museum of Gloucester
- Culture: Romanesque

The Gloucester tabula set is the earliest surviving board and complete set of counters for the game tabula, a tables game and possible predecessor of backgammon. Dating from the 11th or early 12th century, it is an example of Romanesque art. Discovered on the site of Gloucester Castle in 1983, in the English city of Gloucester, it is now on display in the Museum of Gloucester.

== Description ==
The set was excavated at 28–32 Commercial Road, Gloucester, the site of a Norman castle. One hundred and fifty pieces of carved bone were found at the bottom of a late-11th-century rubbish pit. These comprised a full set of 30 gaming pieces, and fragments of the board. Some fragments are missing, and there is evidence of deliberate damage in four places. This suggests that the set was deliberately broken up elsewhere, and dumped in the pit. Archaeological evidence suggests that this happened c. 1070-1120, with study of the artistic characteristics of the board indicating a date of around 1100. The playing pieces are in the Romanesque style of the Normans, but the carved bone pieces which comprise the board exhibit elements of the Borre, Ringerike and Urnes artistic styles. These styles are strongly associated with Vikings, suggesting it may have been built by an Anglo-Scandinavian craftsperson; there is little trace of Anglo-Saxon influence.

The set, like most tables games including backgammon, contains a board of 24 'points', around which the playing pieces would have been moved. The points are divided into two groups of 12, each with different decoration; there is no evidence that the points were coloured. One section of the board was found apparently complete, and suggests that the patterns would have alternated. The points are obelisk shaped. Roman boards had square points, with triangular points appearing only in the 13th century. The design is therefore transitional between these.

The board included spaces between points, and rectangular plates laid lengthways down the centre of the board. The latter are covered in an interlaced snake design.

There is no evidence to indicate that the board was hinged. Corrosion from iron pins indicates that the bone inlay was fastened to a wooden base, about 600 by 450 mm (24 by 18 in) in size.

=== Pieces ===
The set comprises a full set of 30 gaming pieces. The pieces average 44.5 mm (1.75 in) in diameter and are 7.5 mm (0.3 in) thick. It is possible that a lathe was used in the manufacture. A central dimple is present on 26 of the 30 pieces.

No dice were found. The pieces' depictions have been identified as follows. Pieces 1–15 are made from red deer skull, 16–30 from red deer antler. There is no evidence that the pieces were stained to create two distinctly coloured sets. There are no unifying themes in the symbolism that would enable the counters to be grouped into sets.

The attributions below are from Darvill (1988). Stewart (1993) proposes different interpretations of some of the images.

Red deer skull pieces
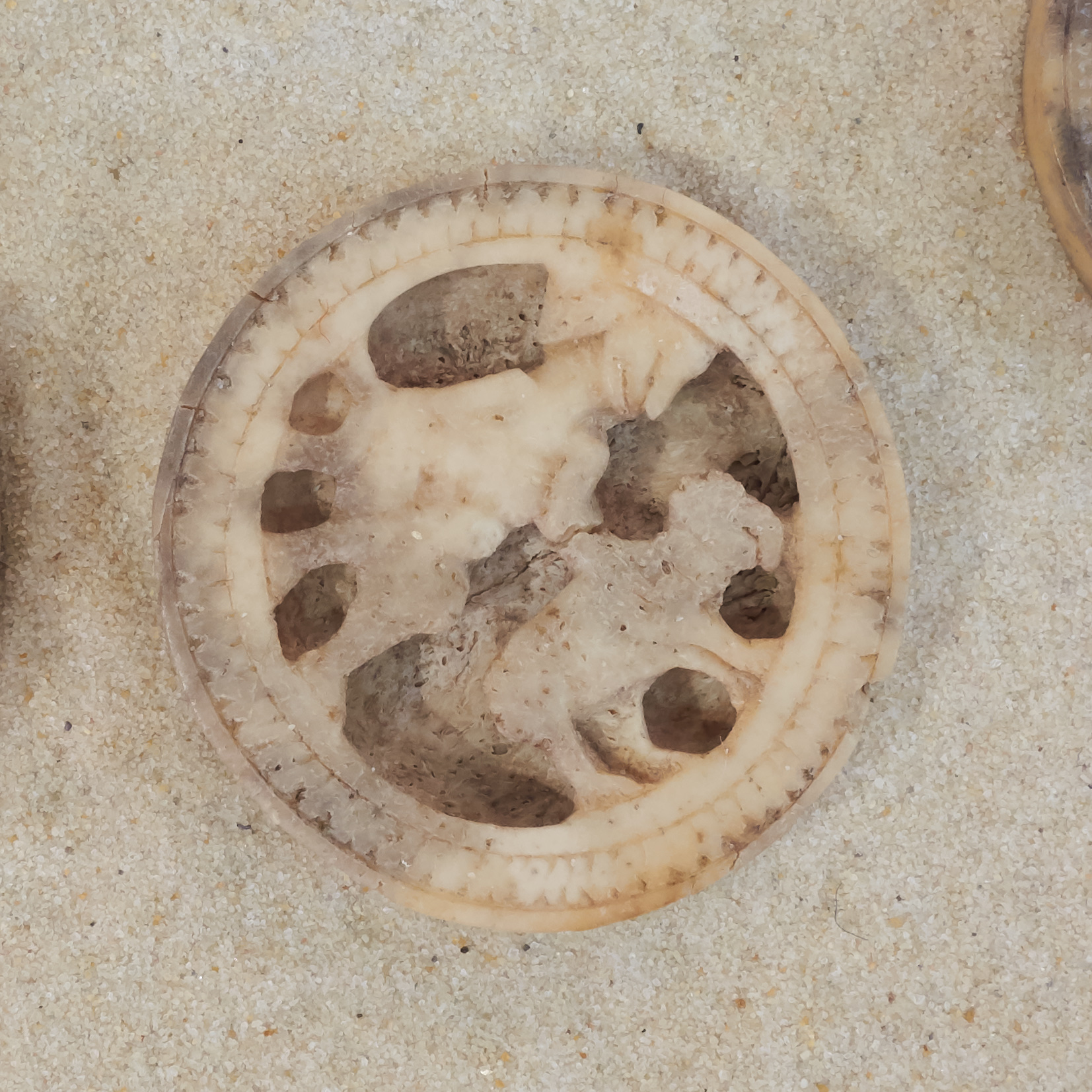
Seated figure with bear

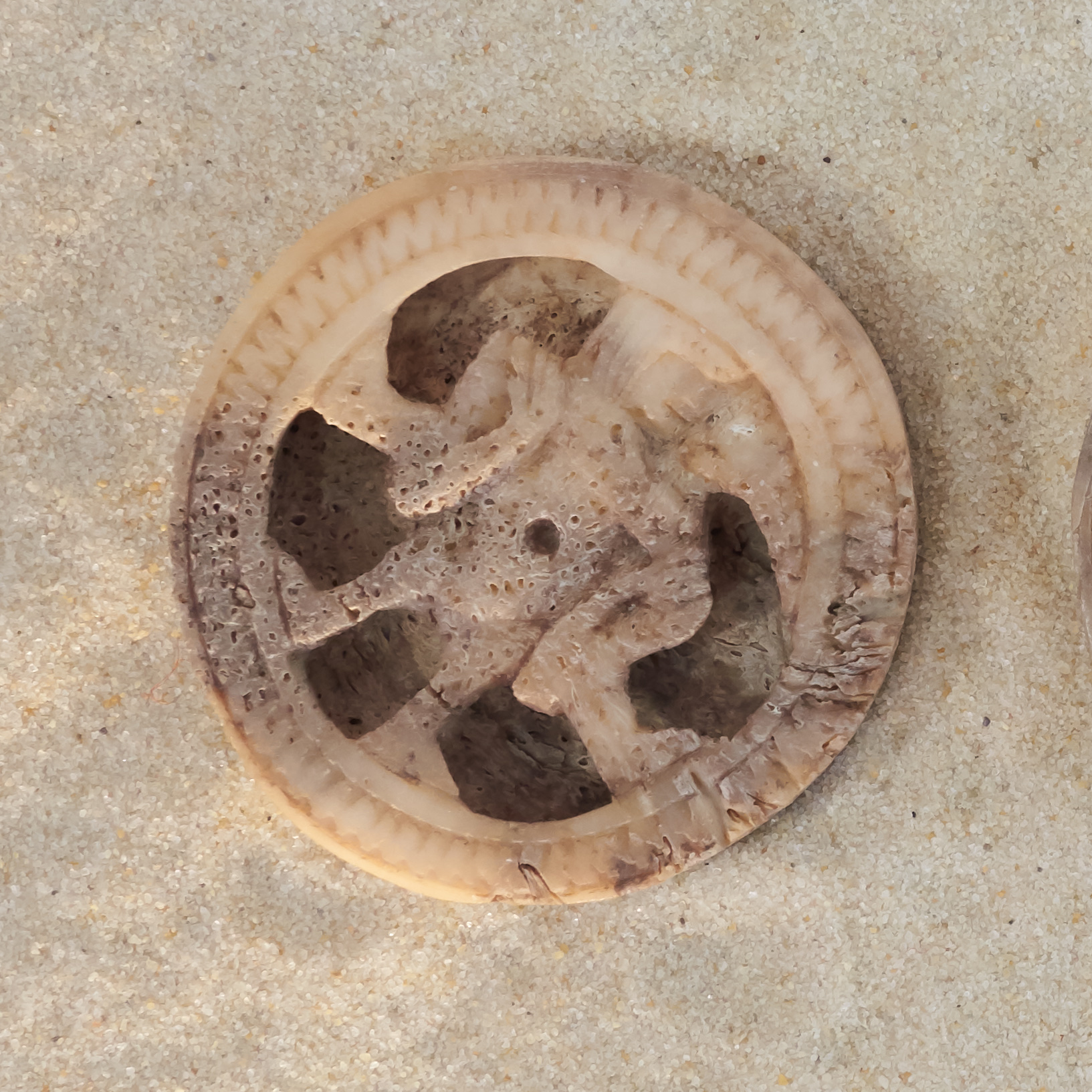
Figure carrying another

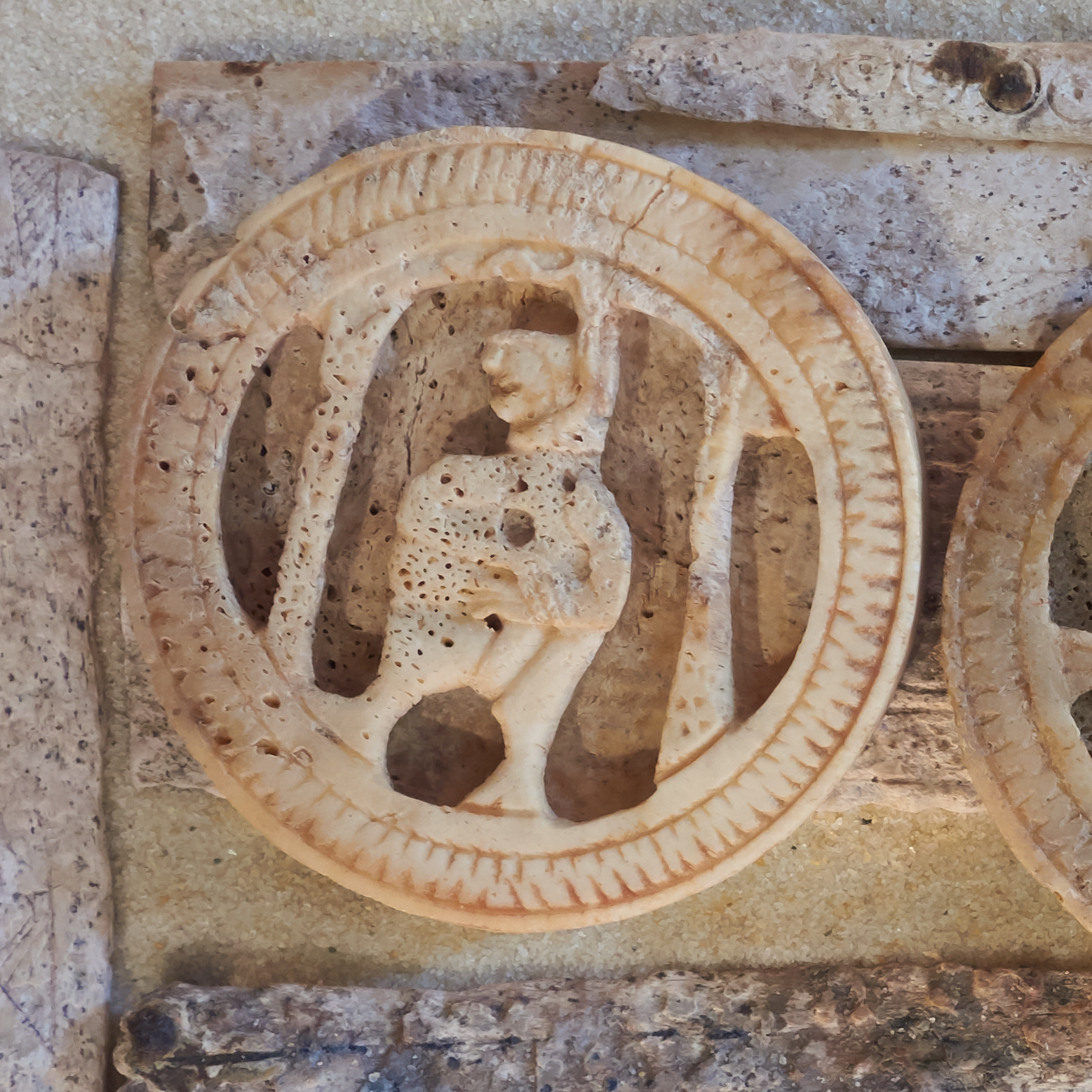
Hanging man

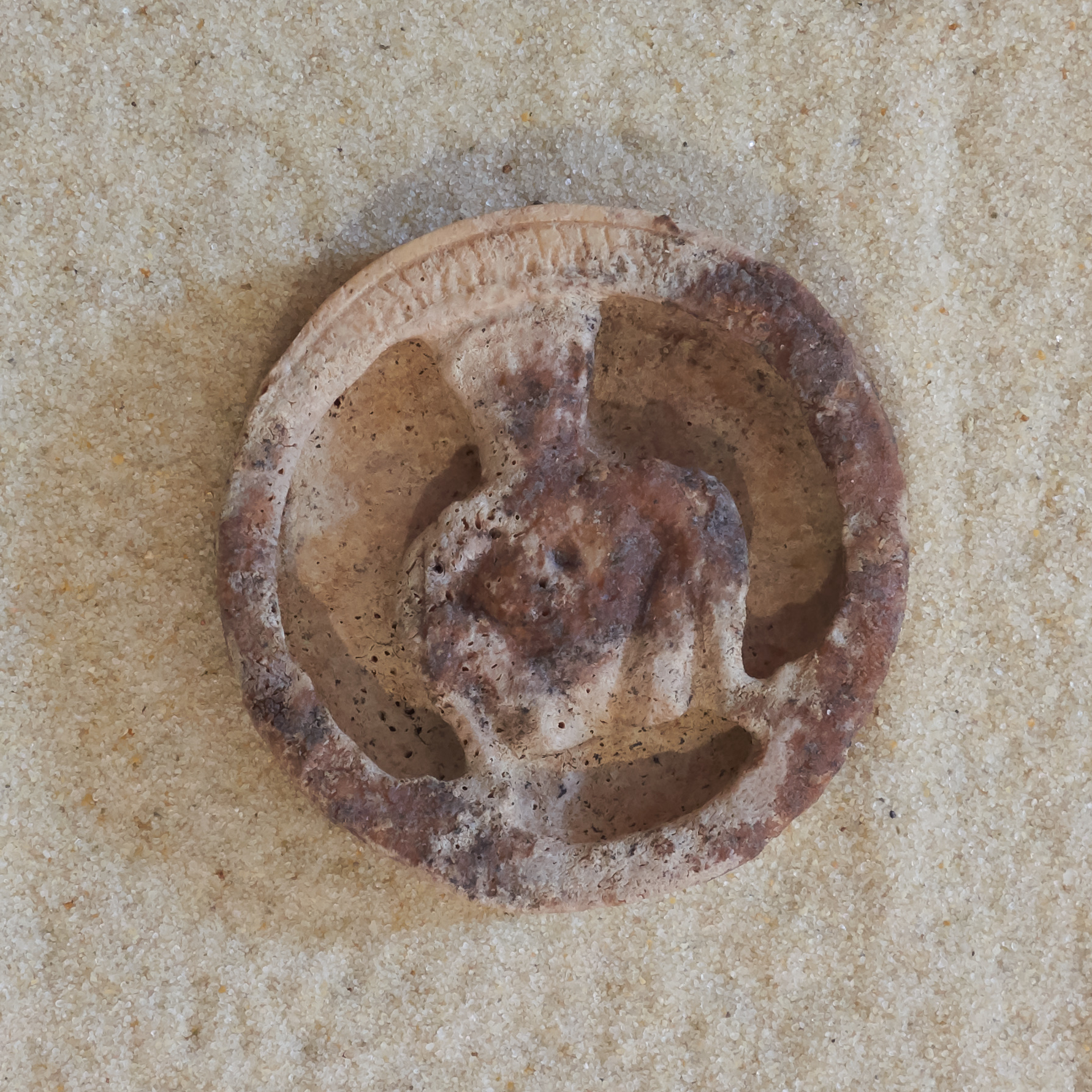
Squatting figure

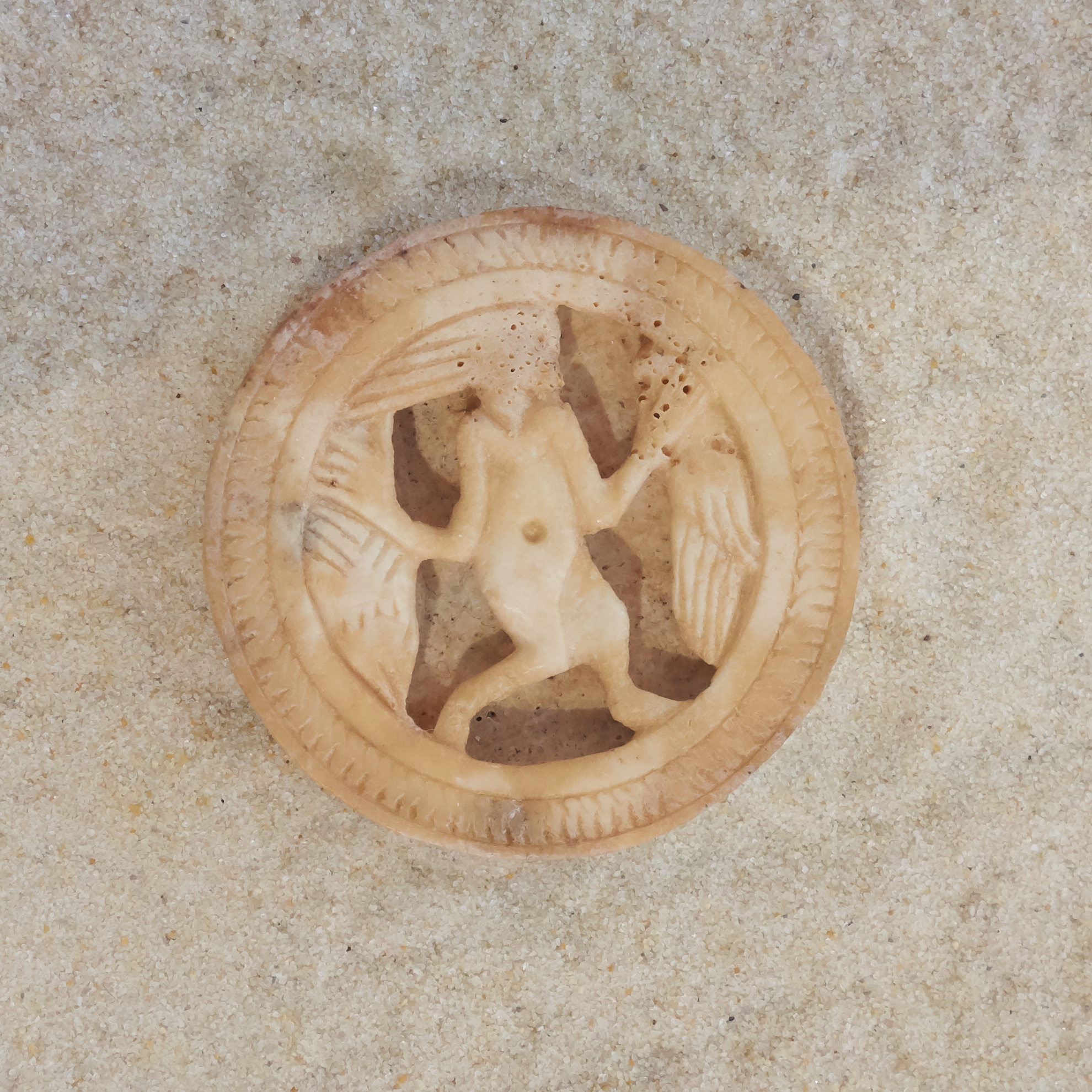
Figure with fish and bird

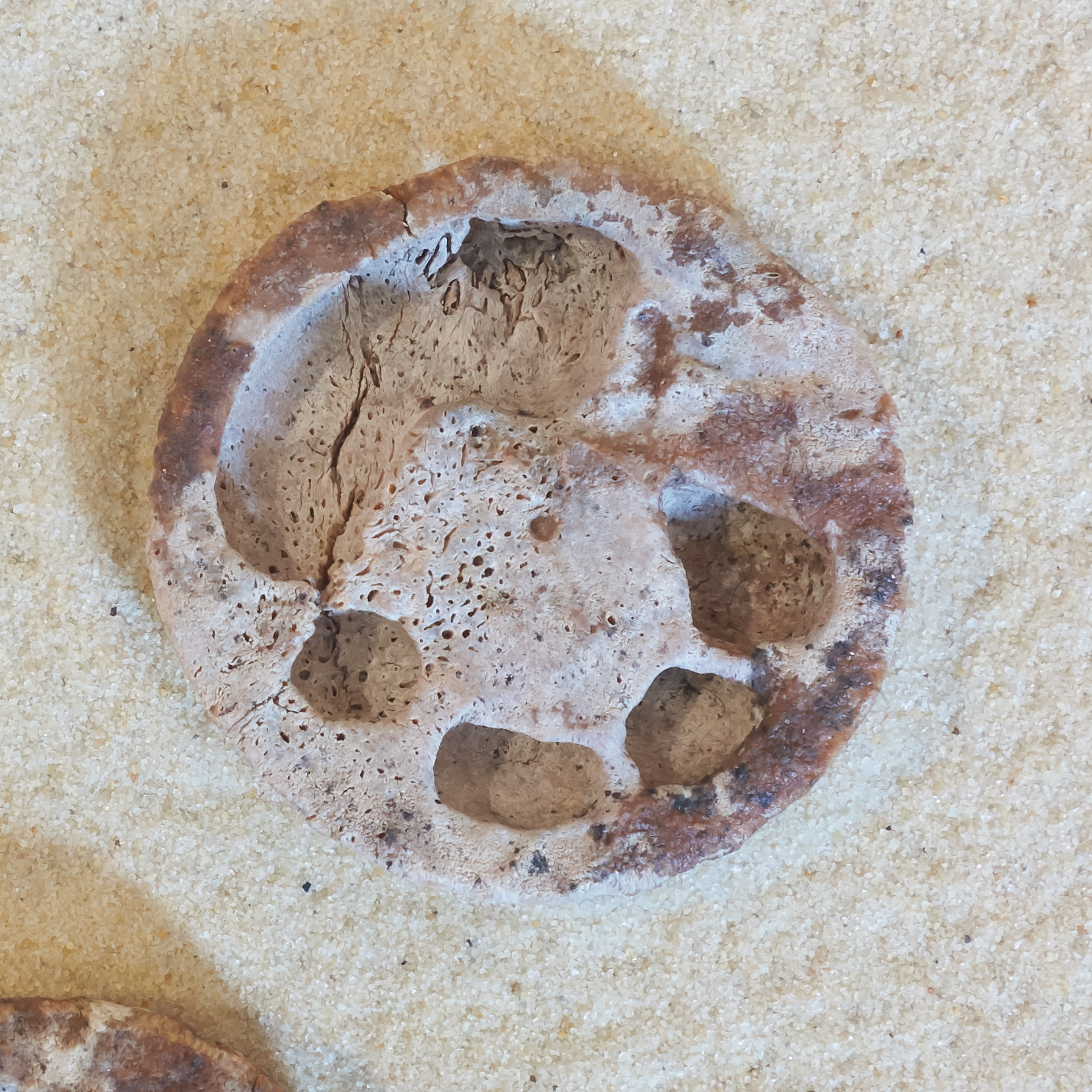
Seated figure (possible)

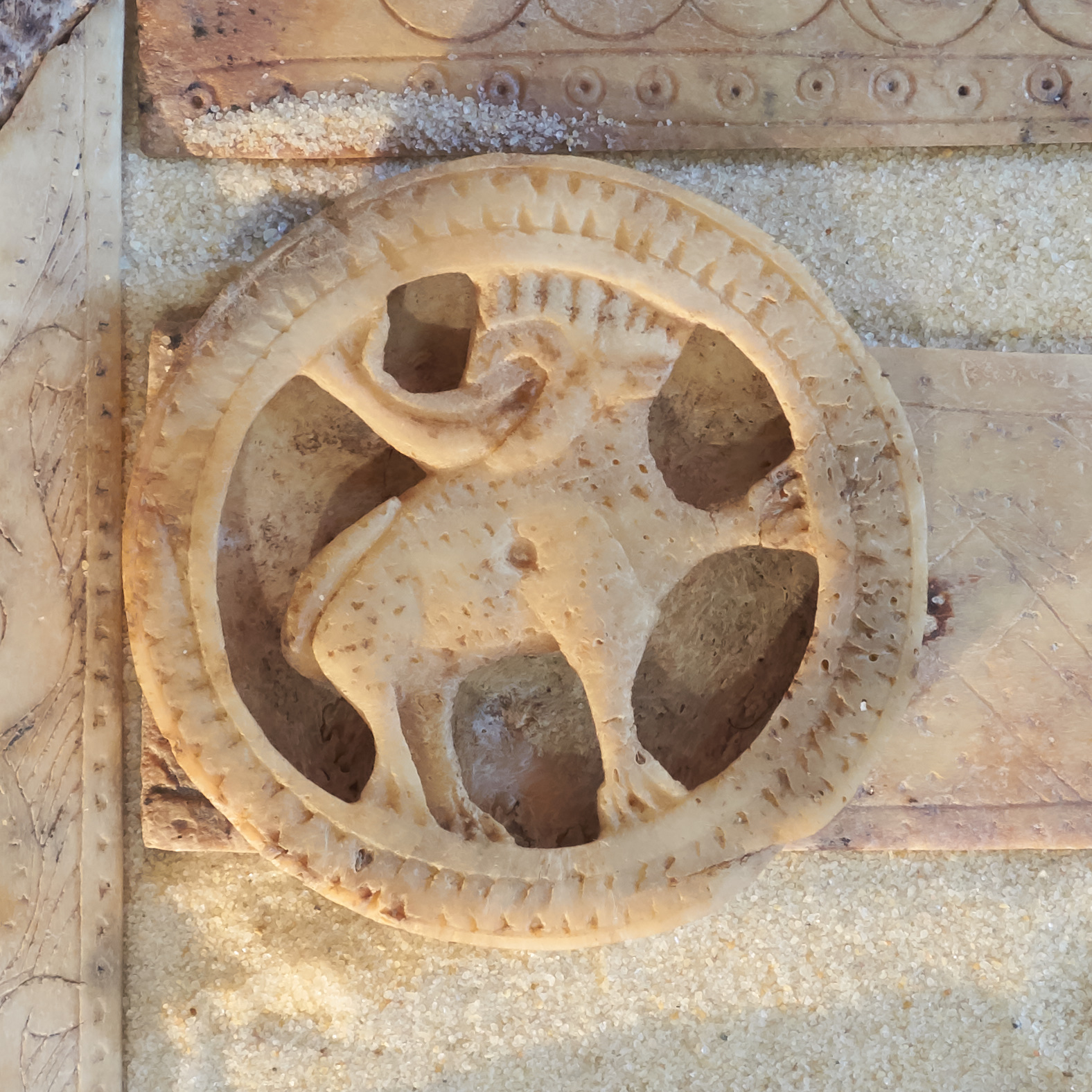
Elephant

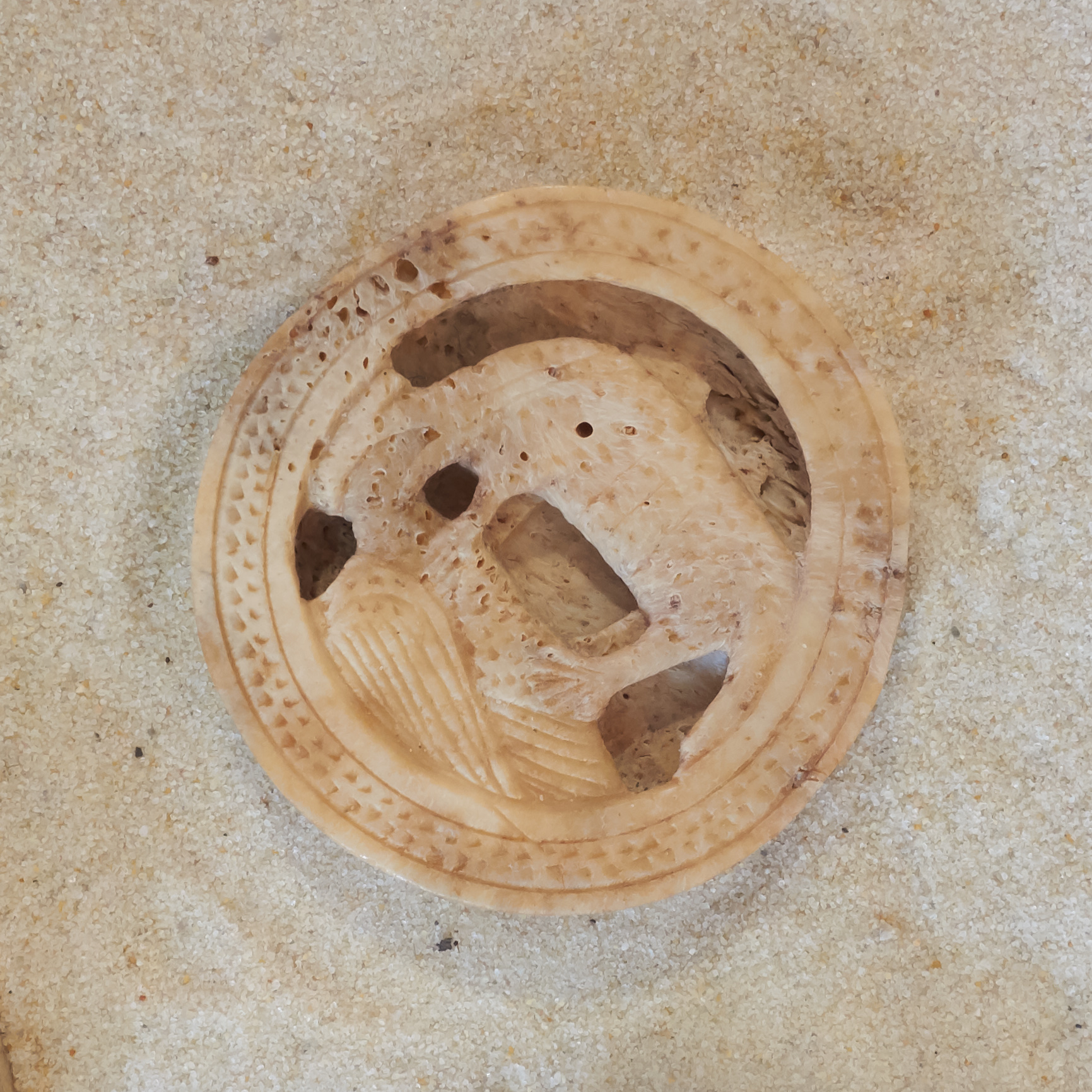
Aesop's fable

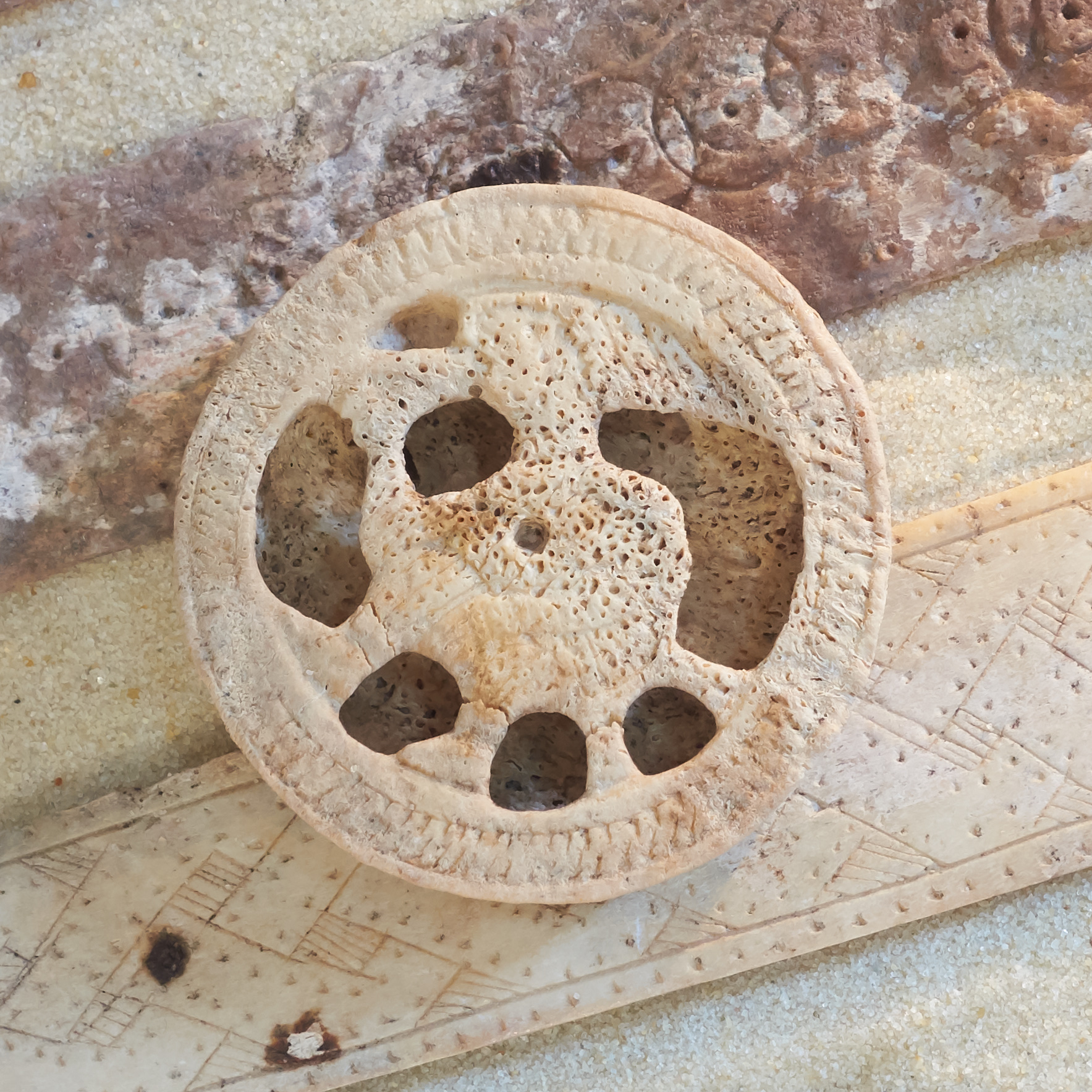
Seated figure eating

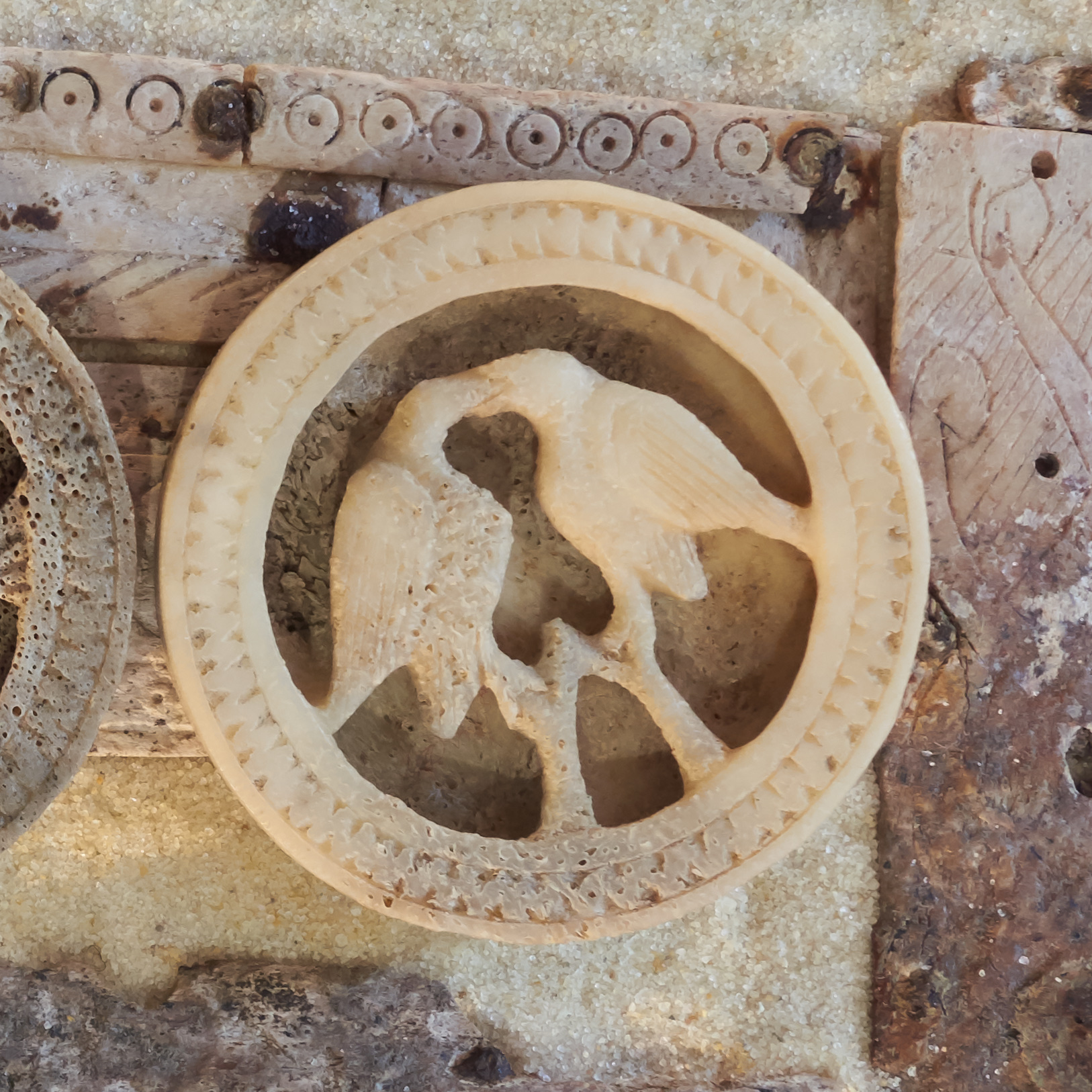
Two confronting birds

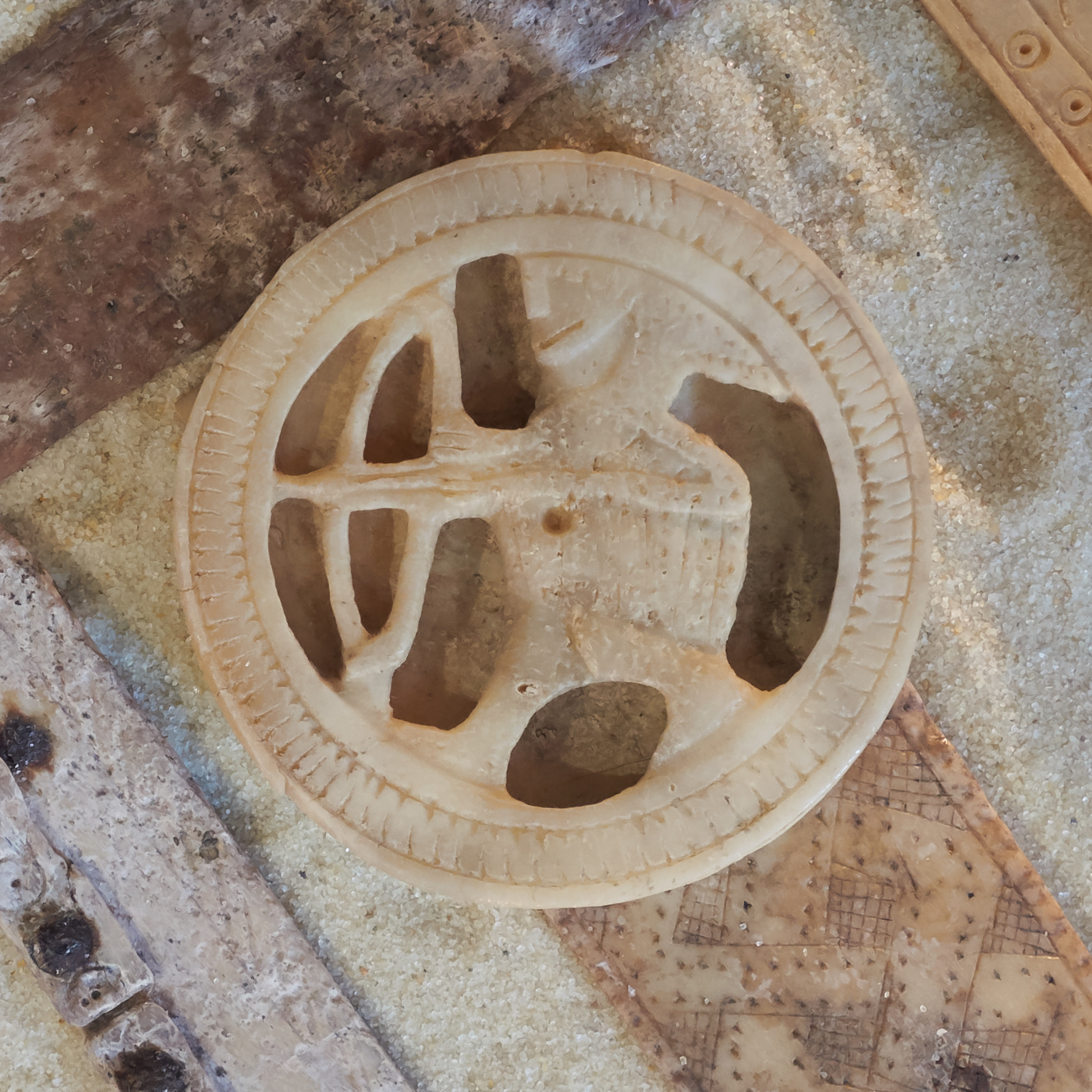
Hooded archer

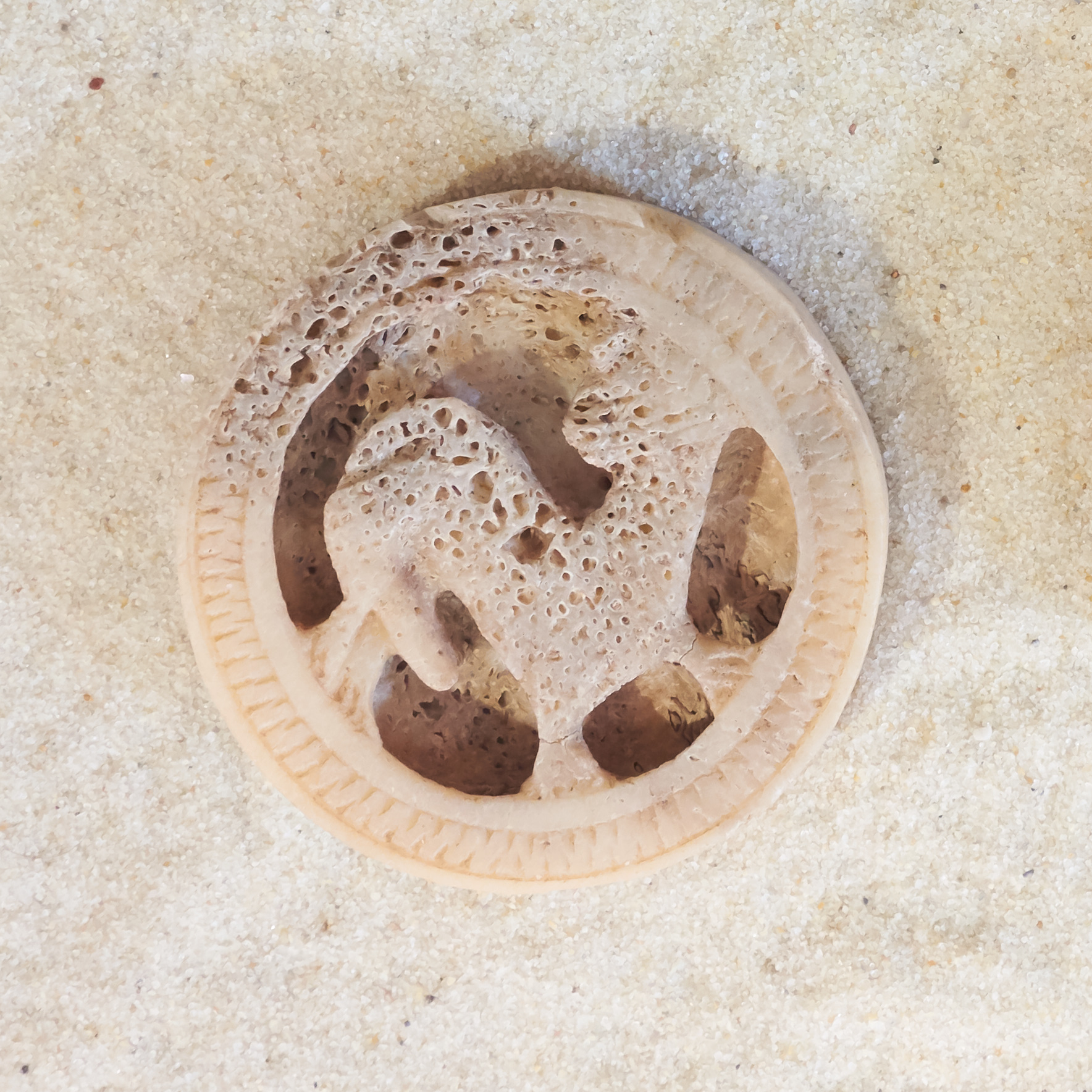
Manticore

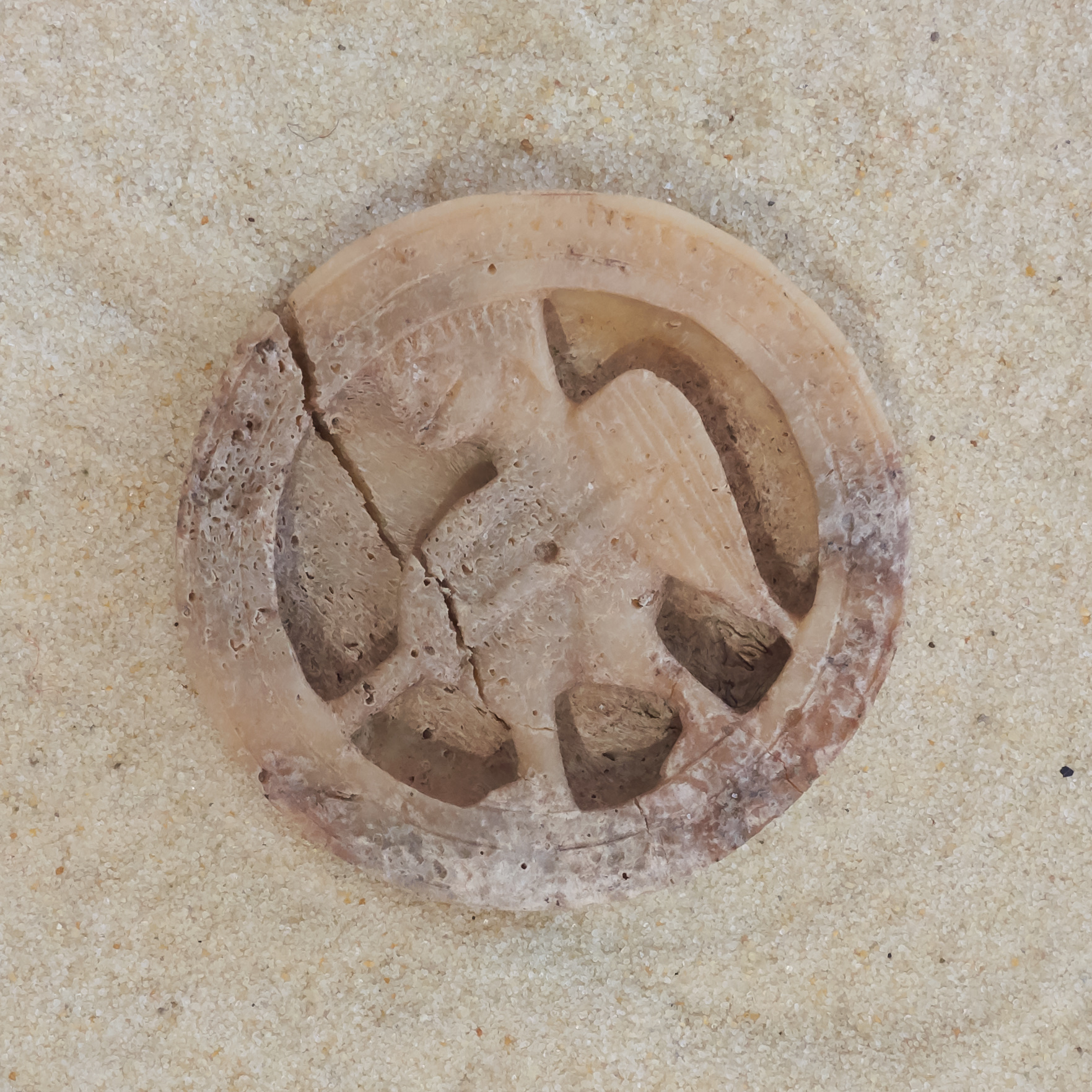
Figure with spear and shield

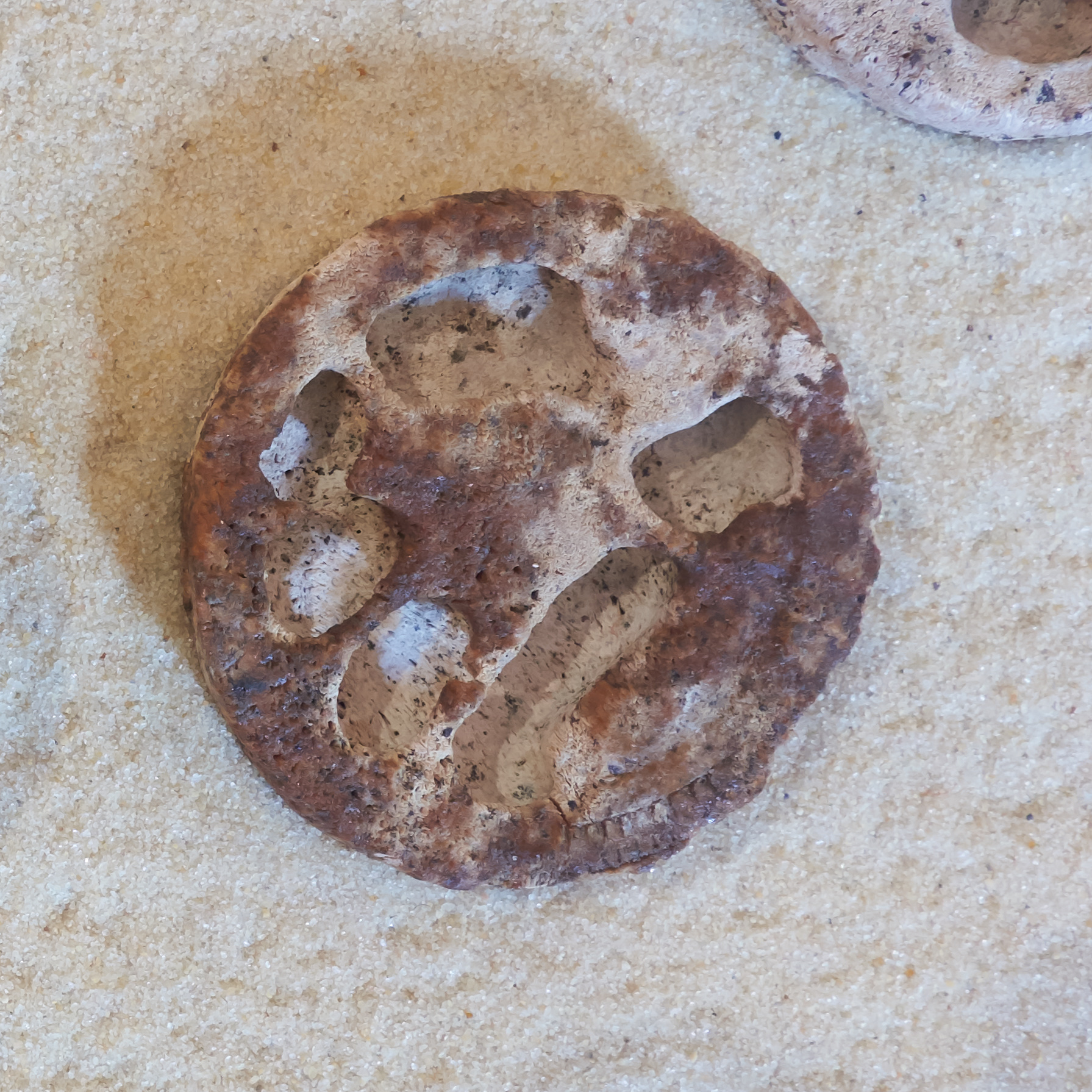
Figure seated by fire (possible)

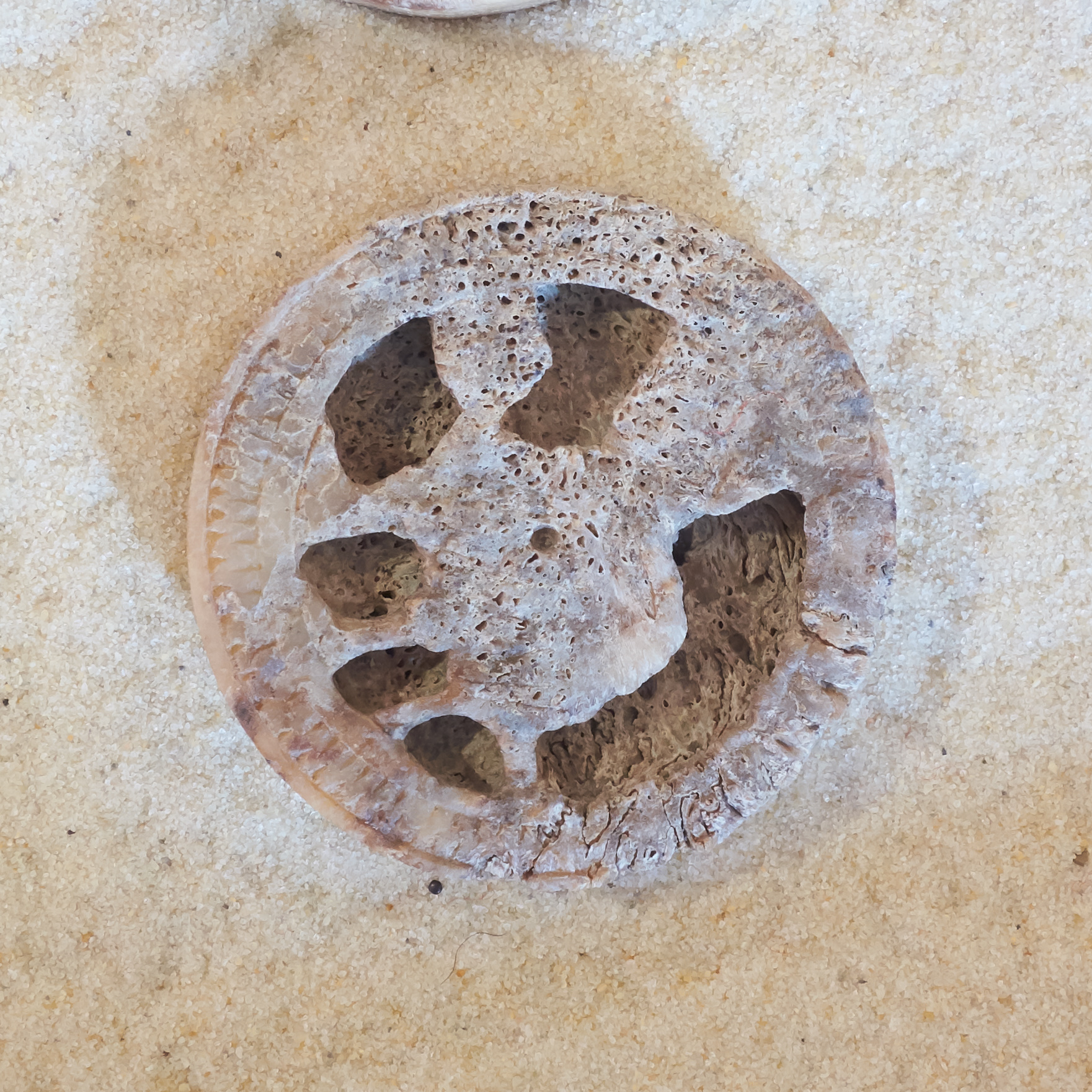
Seated figure drinking
Red deer antler pieces
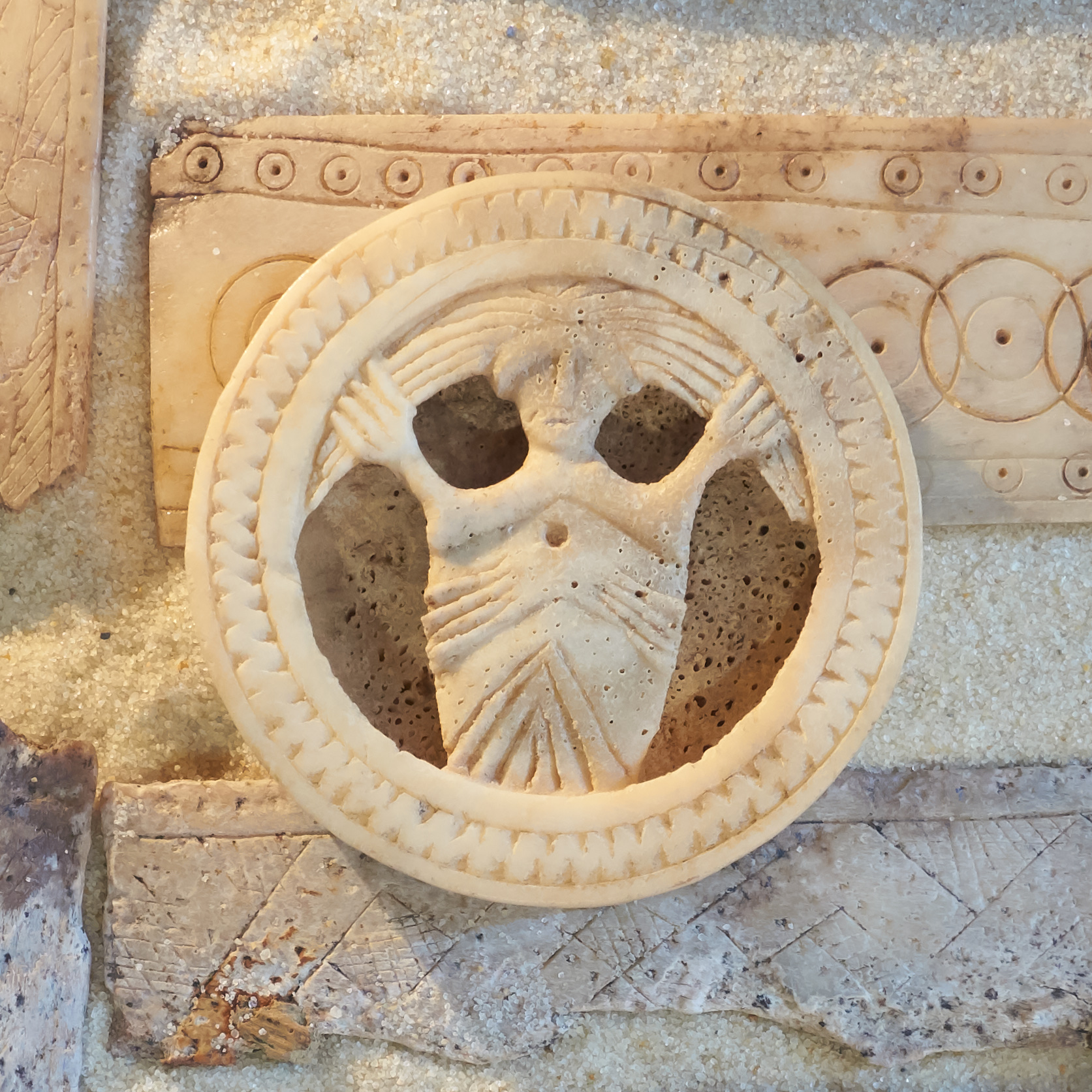
Tress puller

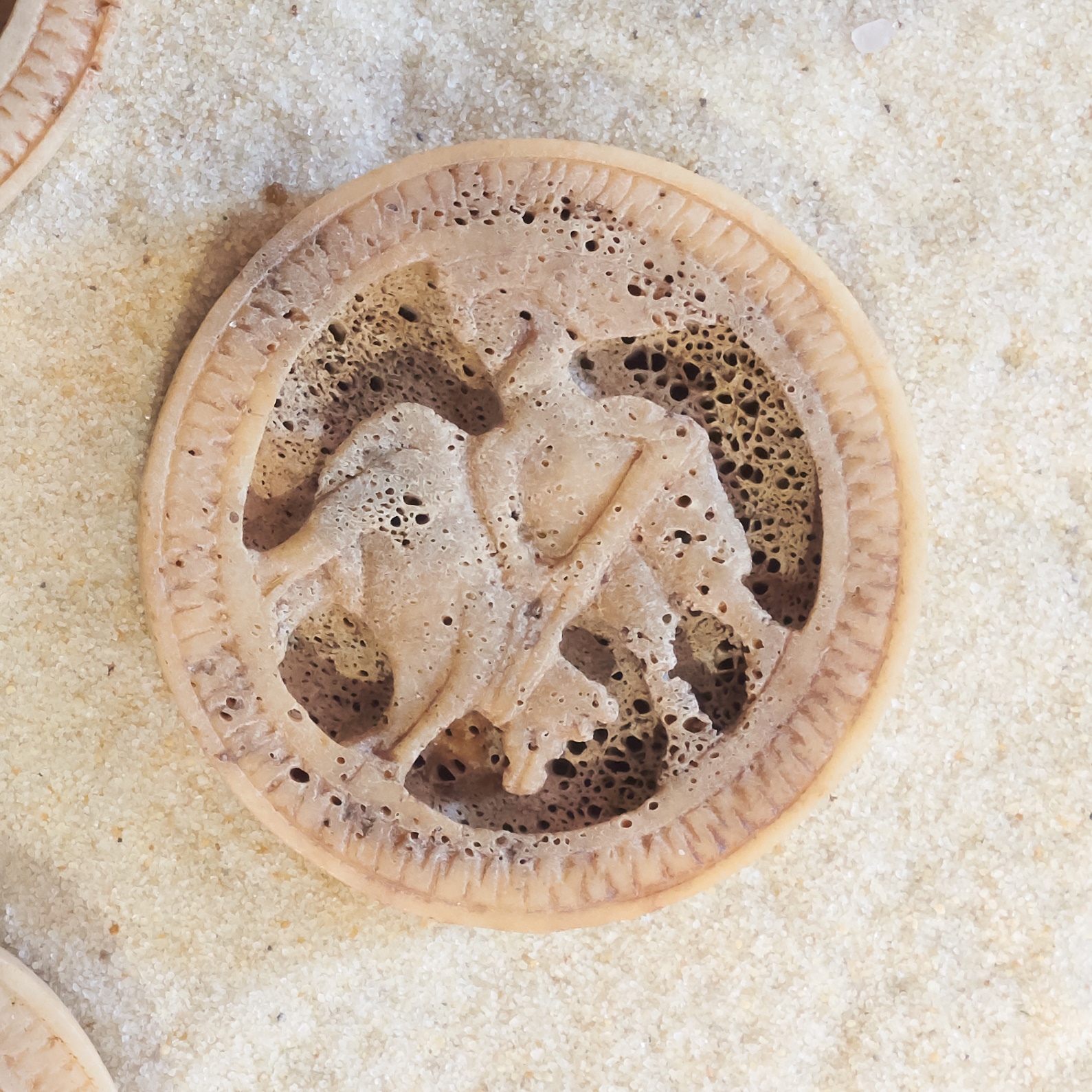
Man with animal on his back (possible)

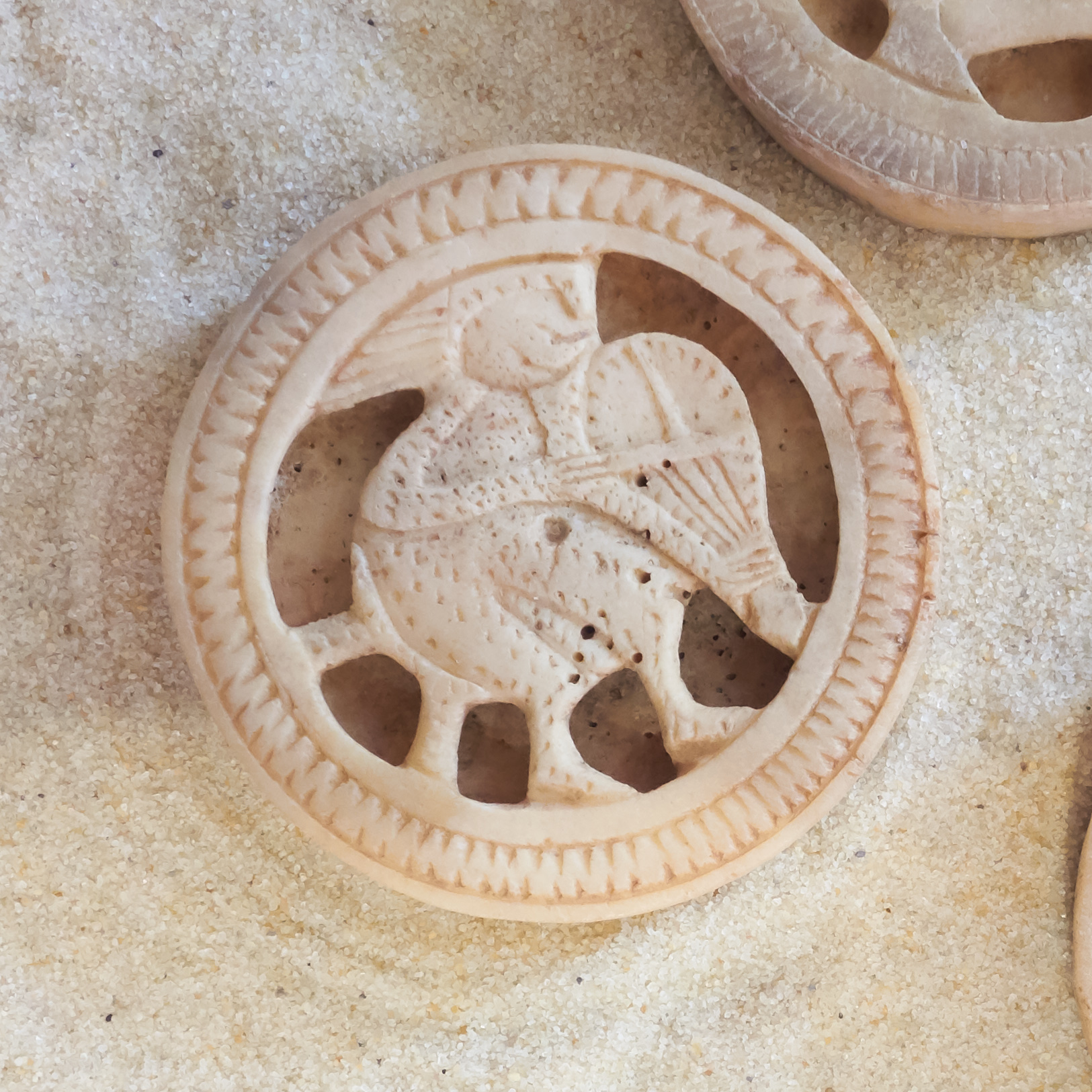
Seated fiddler

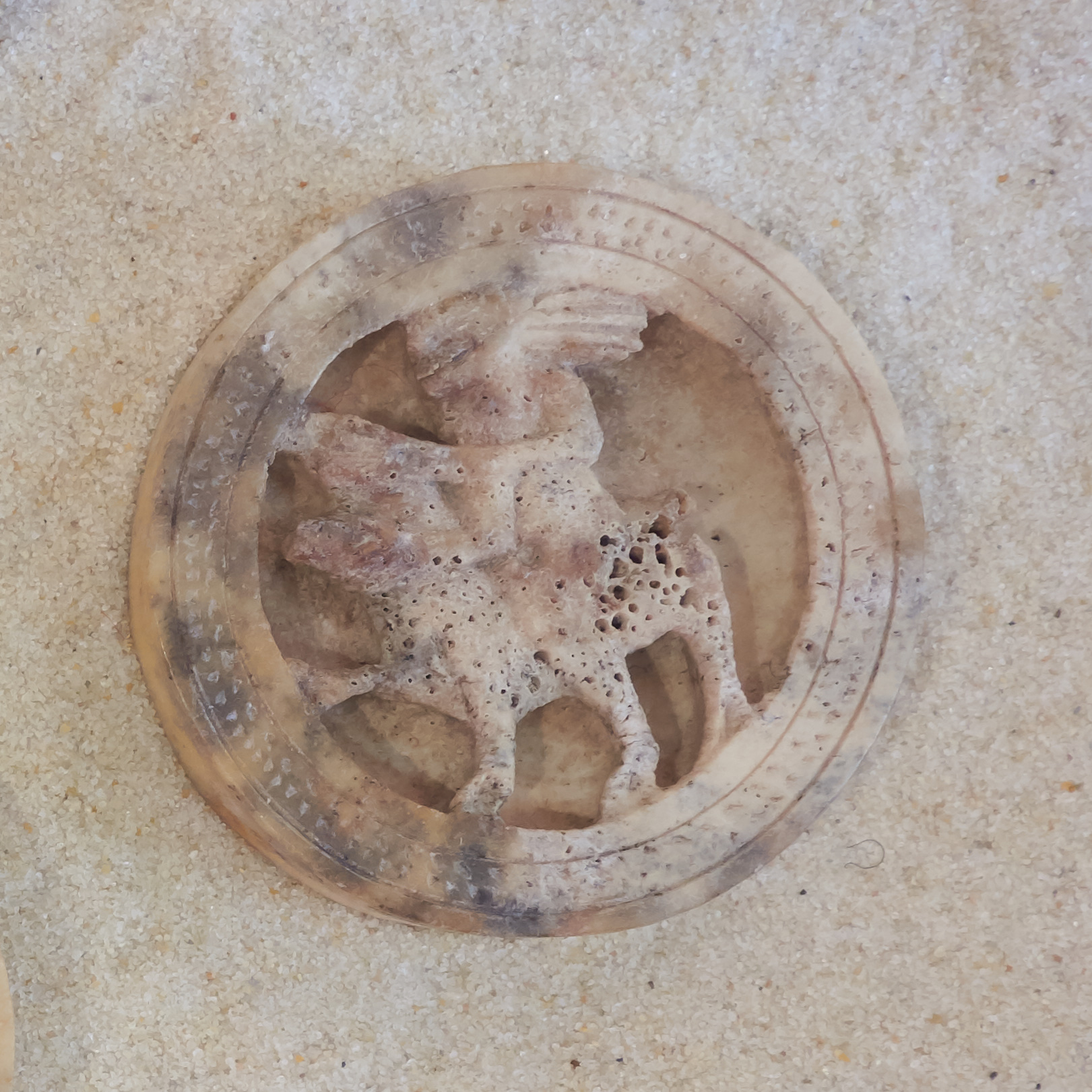
Samson and the lion

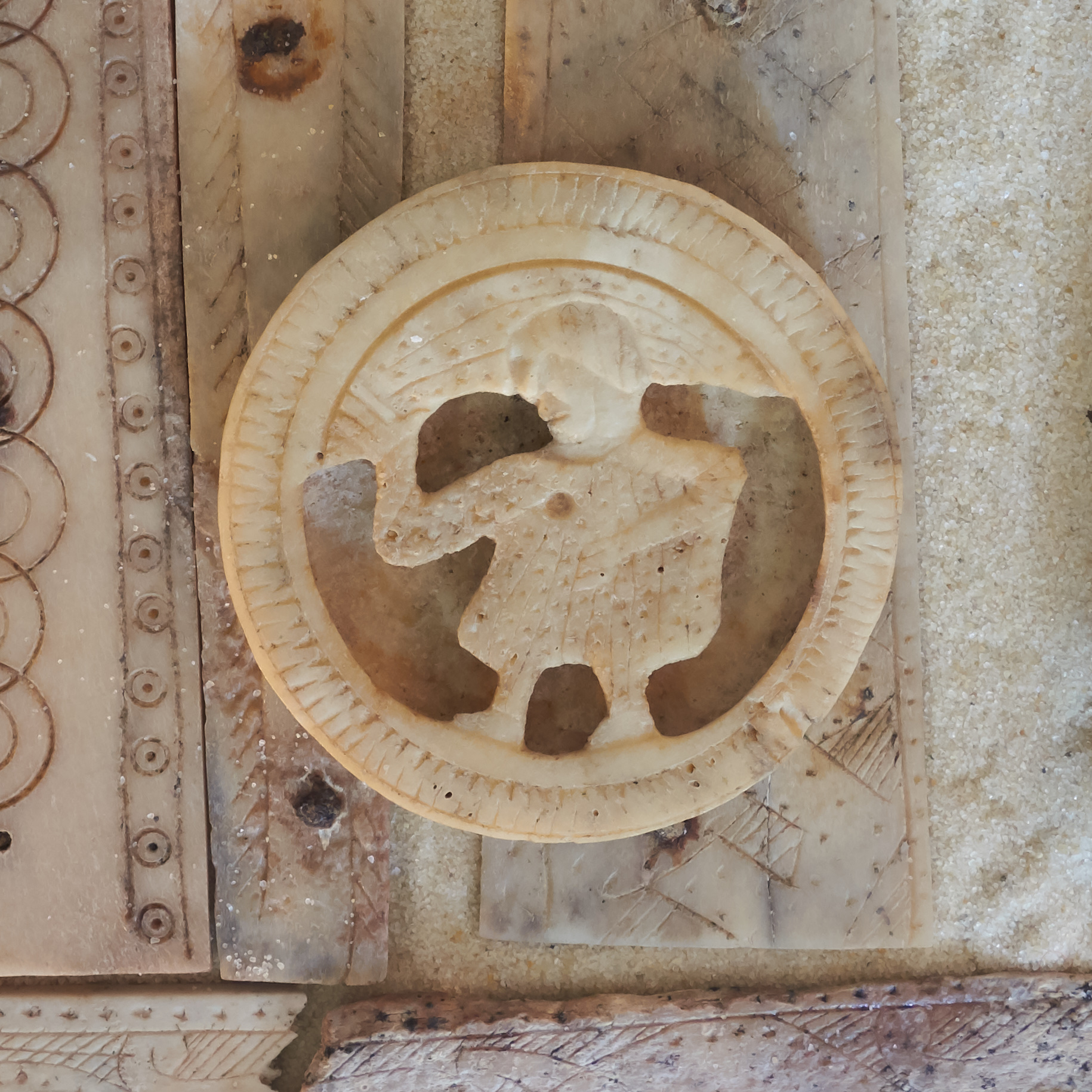
Figure threshing (possible)

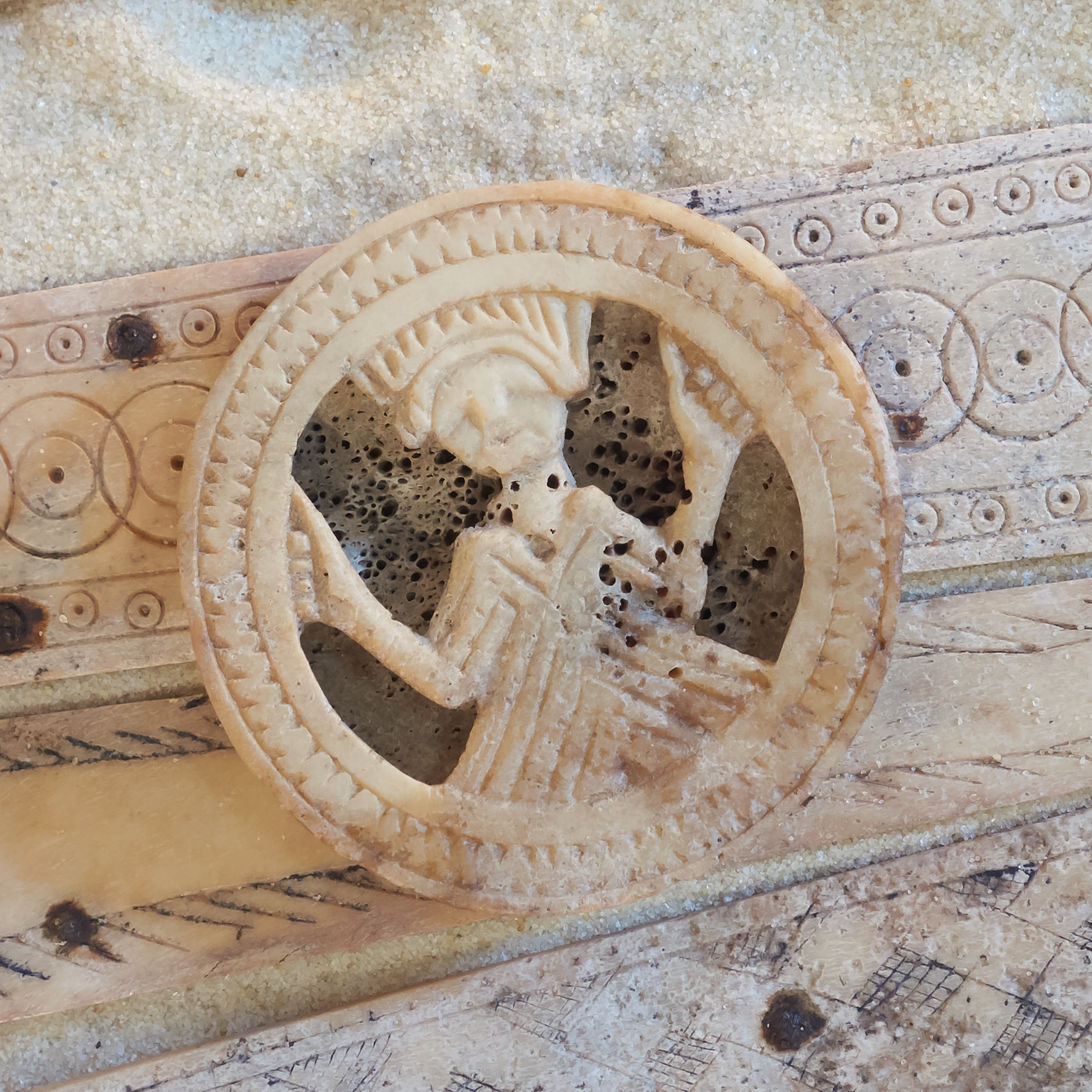
Figure in Orans posture

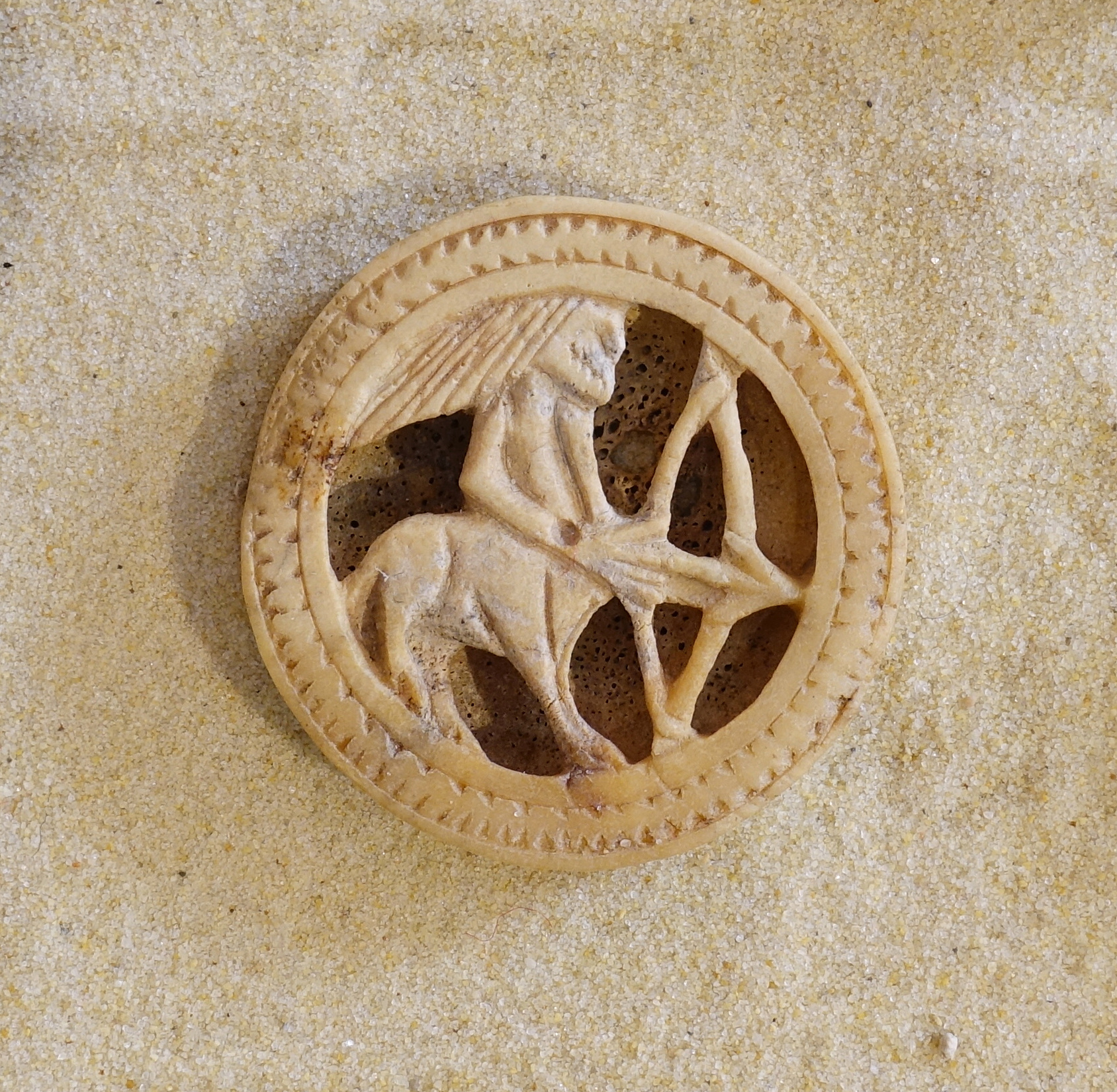
Centaur with bow

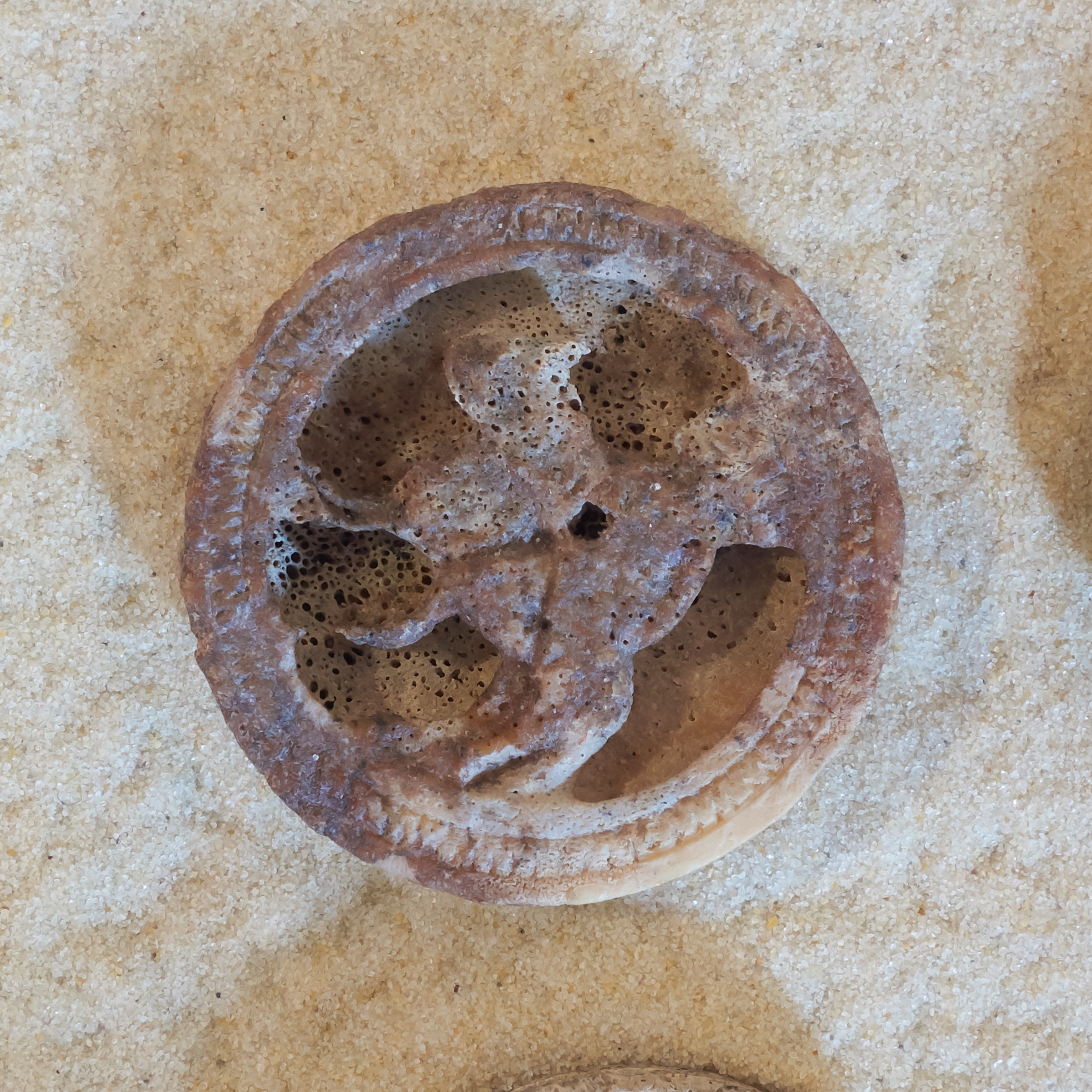
Rider

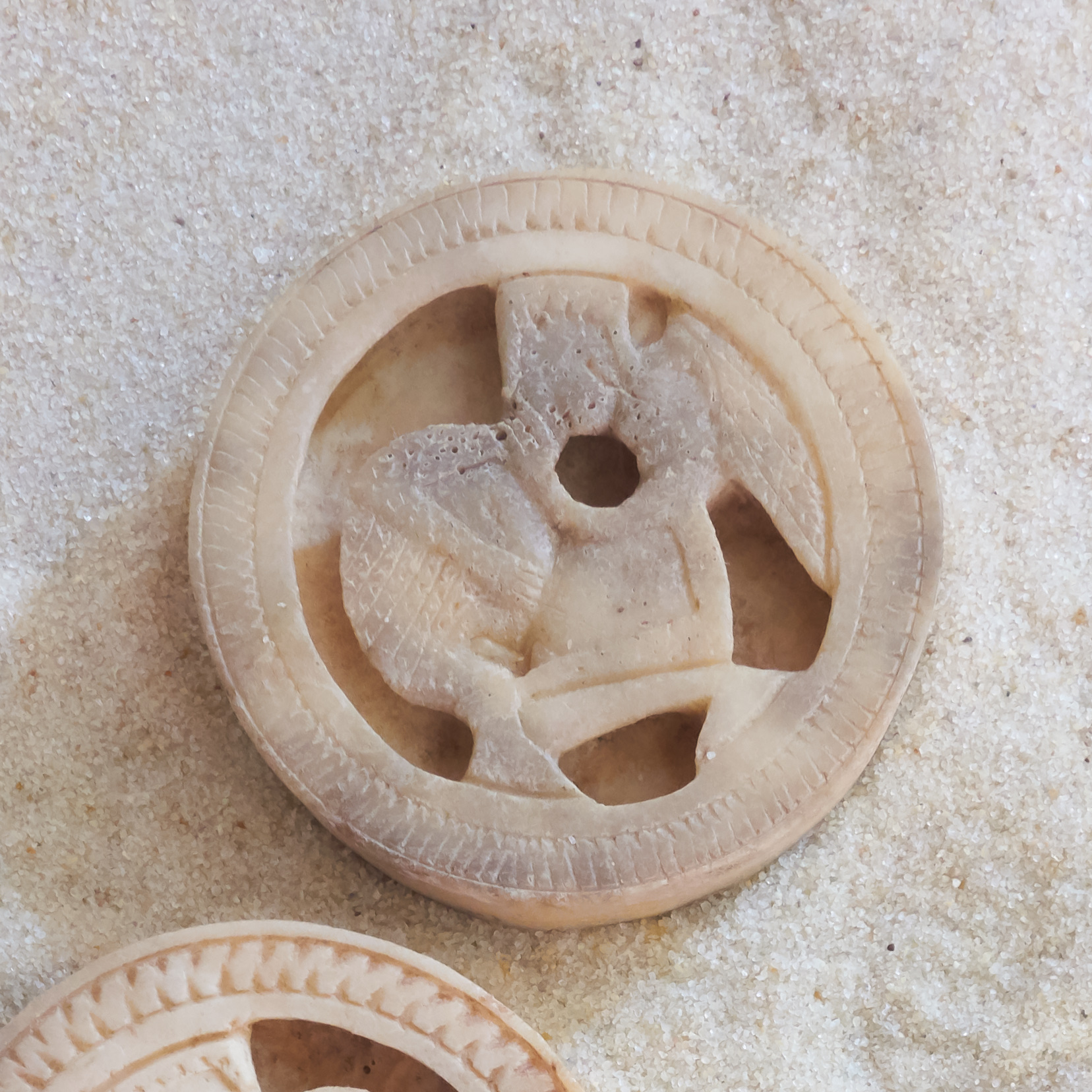
Copulating couple

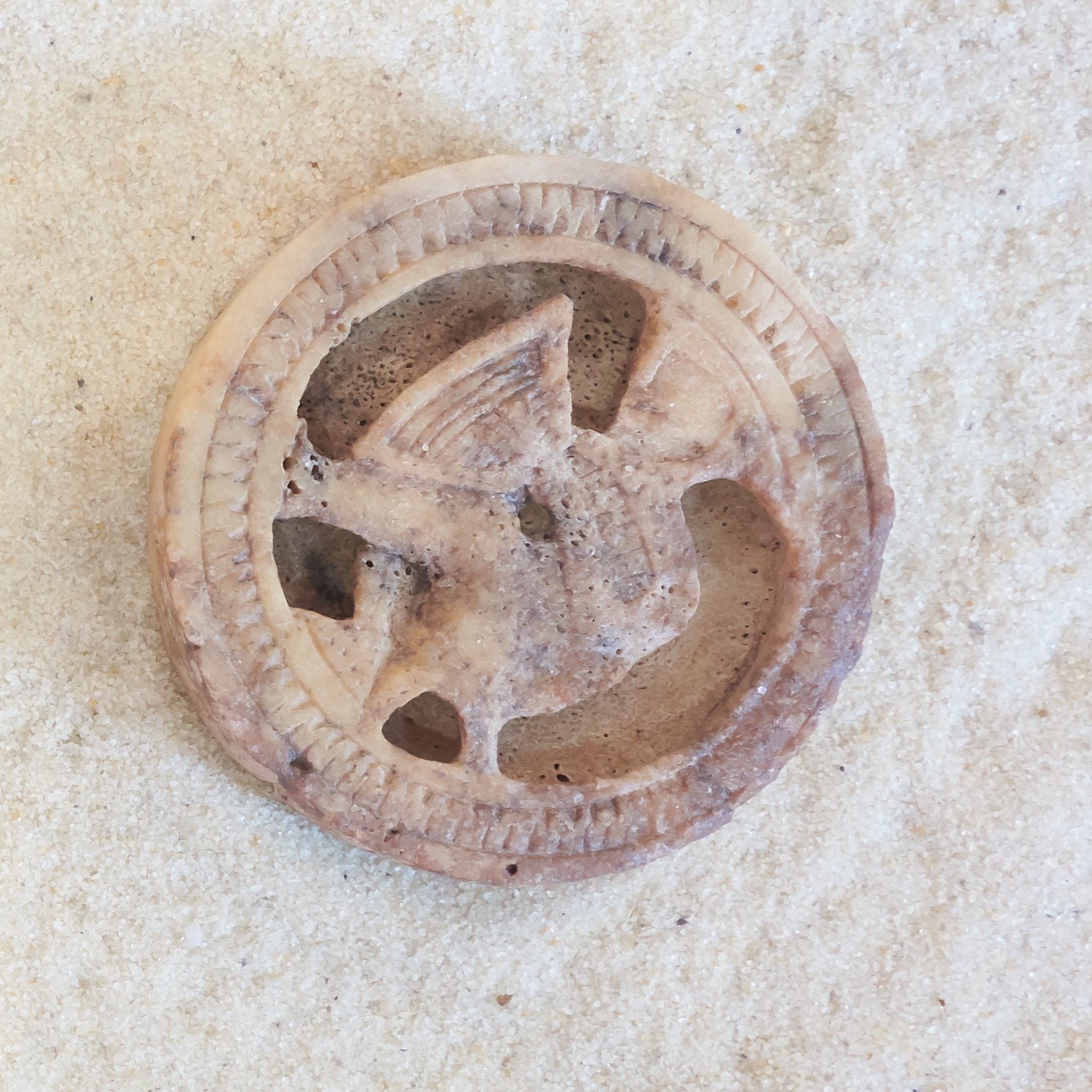
Harpist

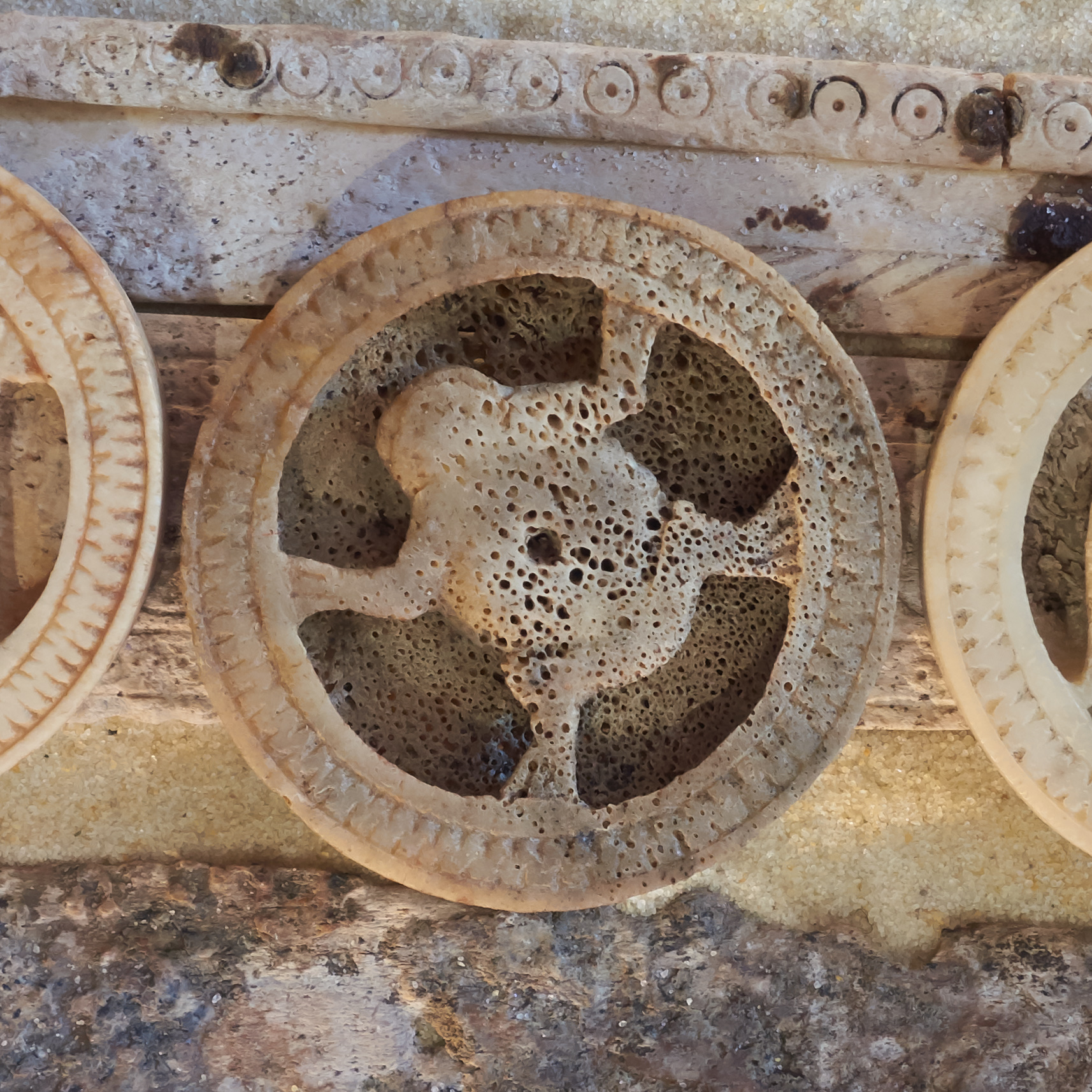
Toad

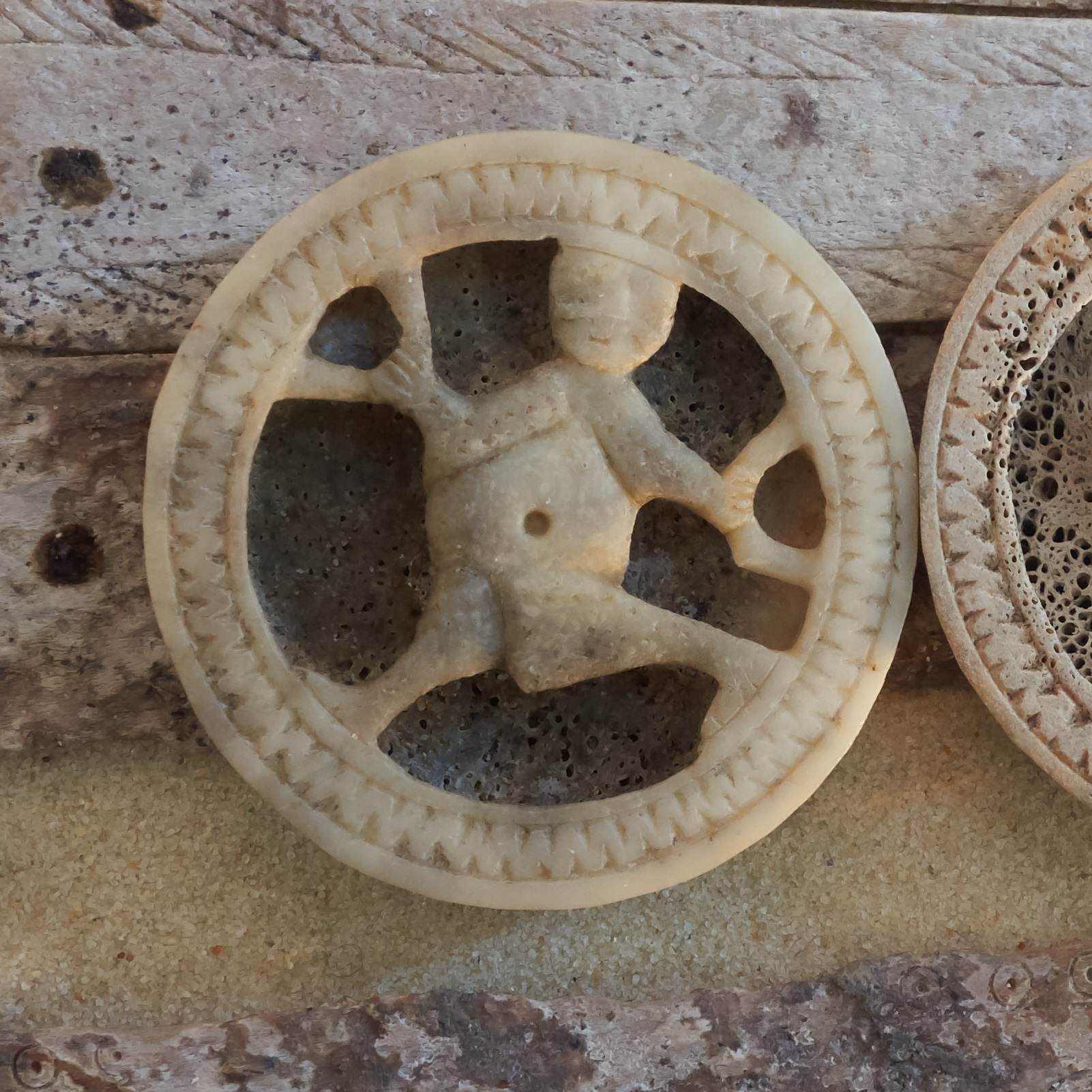
Juggler with hoops

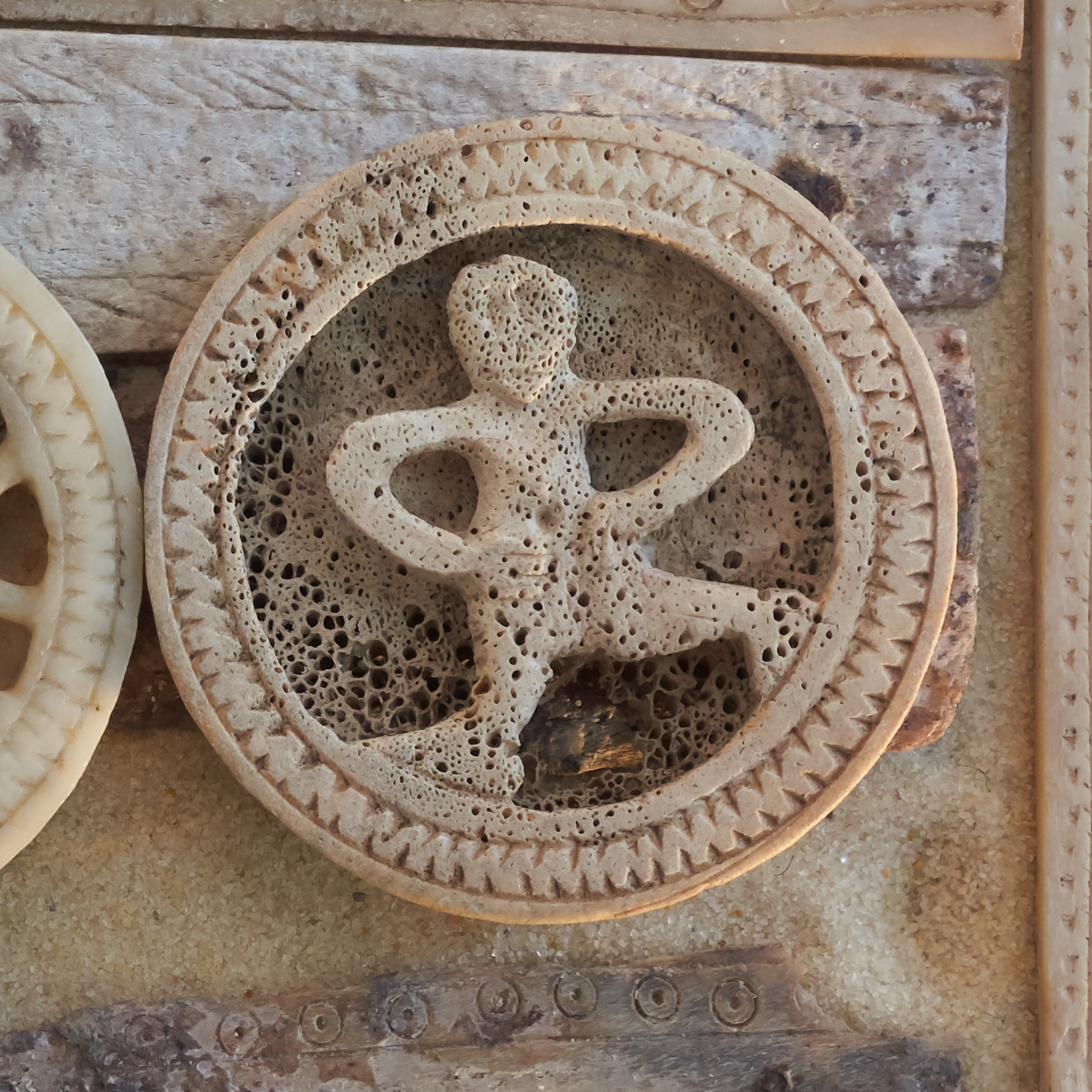
Dancer

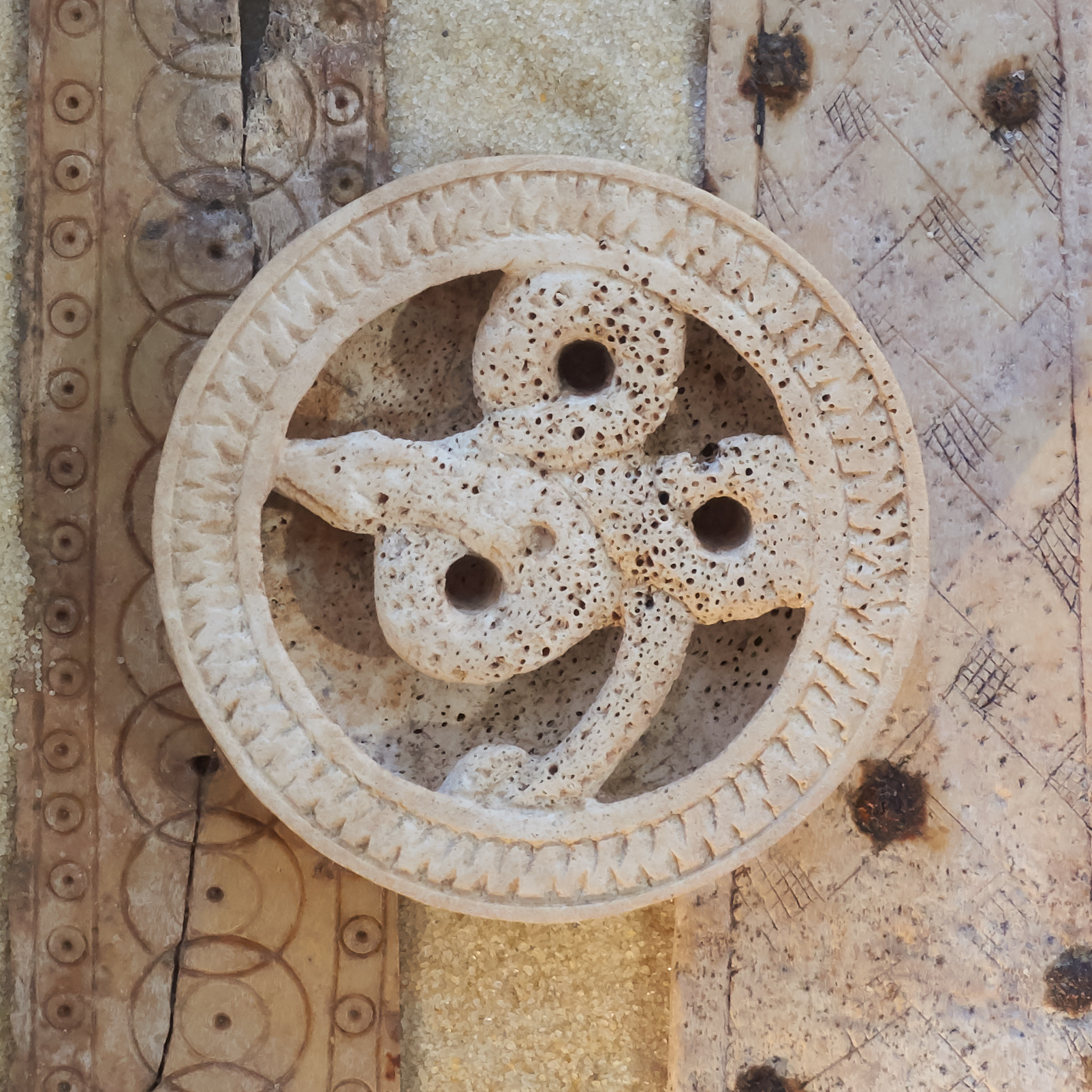
Snake

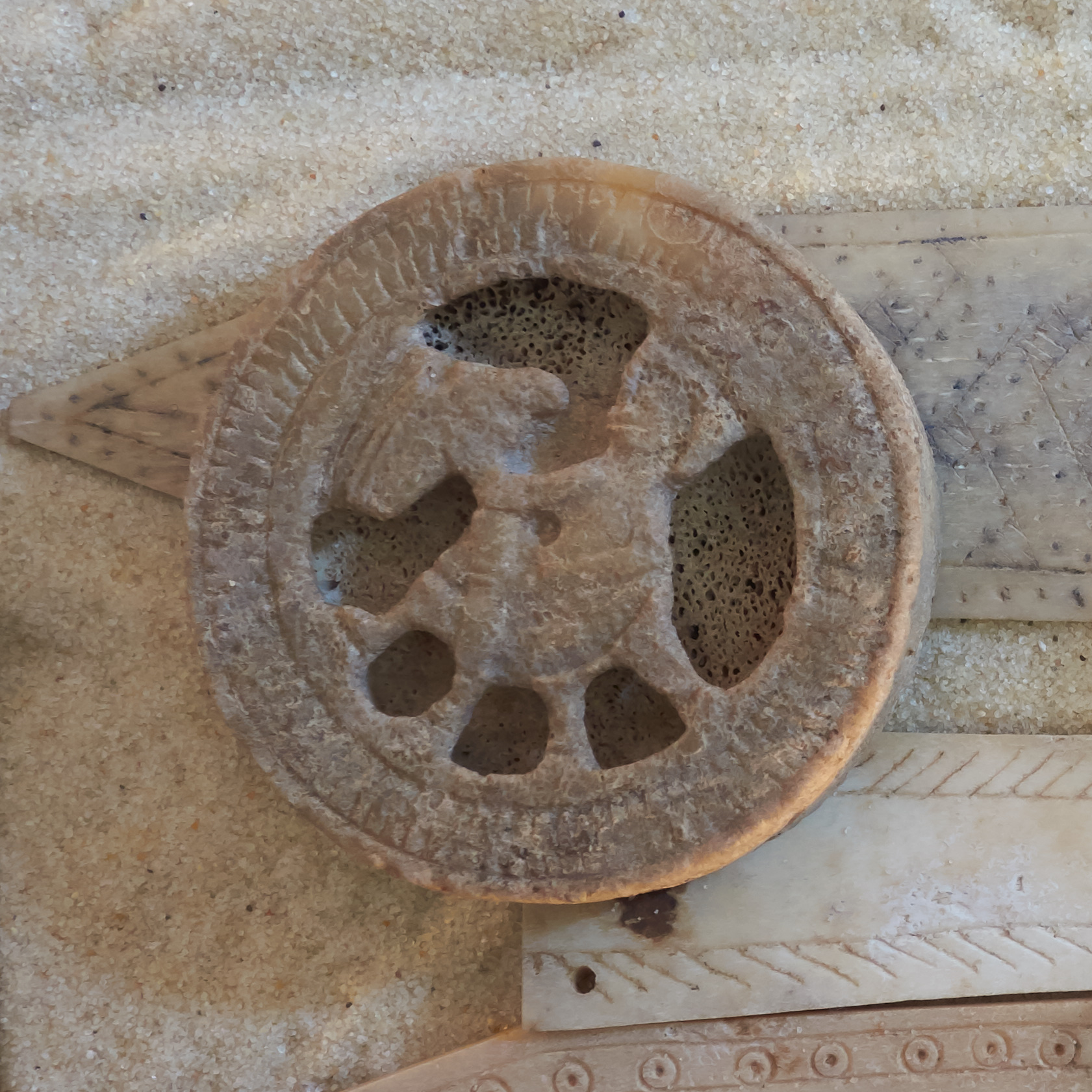
Seated figure with hawk
