= Carolyn M. Heighway =

British archaeologist

Carolyn Mary Heighway FSA (born 1943) is an archaeological consultant to Gloucester Cathedral and the owner, with her husband Richard Maurice Bryant, of Past Historic, a company which specialises in the design and production of archaeological books and journals as well as exhibitions. She was a founder trustee of Cotswold Archaeology in 1989, and is a fellow of the Society of Antiquaries of London. She is a former president of the Bristol and Gloucestershire Archaeological Society.

Heighway specialises in the archaeology of Gloucester and the Anglo-Saxon period and has written extensively on the subject.

== Selected publications ==
=== Books ===
- Ancient Gloucester: The story of the Roman and medieval city. Gloucester: Gloucester City Museum, 1976. ISBN 0-903340-04-6
- The East Gate of Gloucester. Gloucester: Gloucester City Museum, 1980. ISBN 0-903340-06-2
- Gloucester: a history and guide. Gloucester: Alan Sutton Publishing Limited, 1985. ISBN 0-86299-256-7
- The Golden Minster: The Anglo-Saxon Minster and Later Medieval Priory of St Oswald at Gloucester, 1999, Council for British Archaeology (co-author)
- Gloucester Cathedral – Faith, Art and Architecture: 1000 years. 2011. Scala Books. (With Susan Hamilton) ISBN 9781857596670

=== Articles ===
- "Excavations at Nos. 1 and 30 Westgate Street, Gloucester: The Roman Levels" by Carolyn M. Heighway, Et al. in Britannia, Vol. 11 (1980), pp. 73–114.
- "The Roman Tilery at St Oswald's Priory, Gloucester" by Carolyn M. Heighway, Et al. in Britannia, Vol. 13 (1982), pp. 25–77.
