= Rufus Sita Tombstone =

Roman grave marker

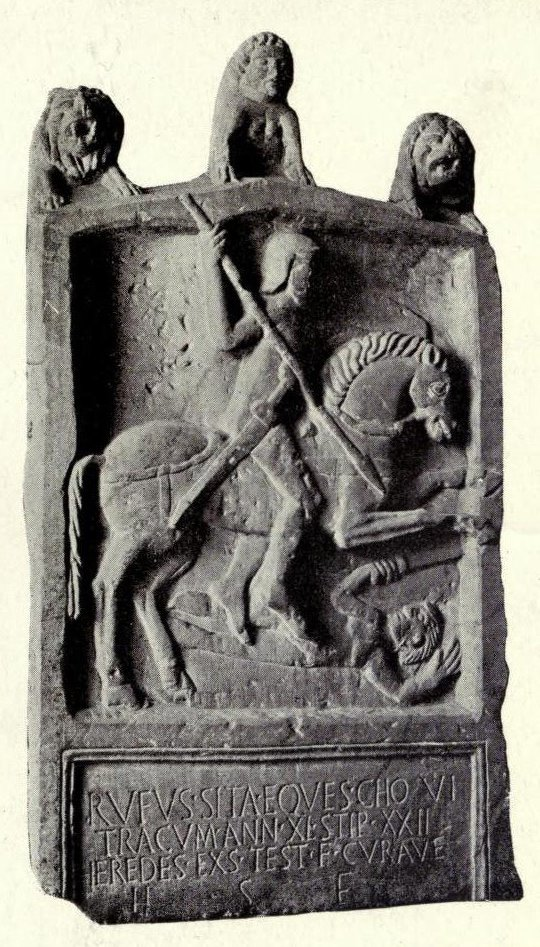
- The Rufus Sita Tombstone
- Type: Tombstone
- Created: 1st century AD
- Discovered: 1824; London Road, Gloucester, UK
- Present location: Gloucester City Museum & Art Gallery
- Identification: RIB 121; Gloucester Museum GLRCM: A2737
- Culture: Roman

The Rufus Sita Tombstone is the marker of the grave of Rufus Sita, a Roman soldier from the mid 1st Century AD, found near London Road, Gloucester, in 1824.

== Description ==
The tombstone depicts a mounted horseman bearing a shield and spear, with a sheathed sword on this flank. He rides to the ride, striking at a defeated enemy prone on the ground beneath him. Above the relief is a Sphinx flanked by a pair of lions. It measures 1.44 m in height and 0.81 m width.

=== Inscription ===
The Latin inscription on the tombstone reads:

RVFVS · SITA · EQVES · CHO · VI
TRACVM · ANN · XL · STIP · XXII
HEREDES · EXS · TEST · F · CVRAVE

H. S. E.

or:

Rufus Sita, eques Cohortis VI
Thracum, annorum XL, stipendiorum XXII.
Heredes ex testamento faciendum curaverunt.

Hic situs est.

Which translates as:

Rufus Sita, horseman of the Sixth Cohort of Thracians,
lived forty years and served twenty-two.
His heirs, in accordance to his will, had this erected.

He is laid here.

=== Reception ===
The tombstone has been in the Gloucester City Museum & Art Gallery since 1873.

== See also ==
- Roman military tombstones
