= Greeks in pre-Roman Gaul =

Ethnic group

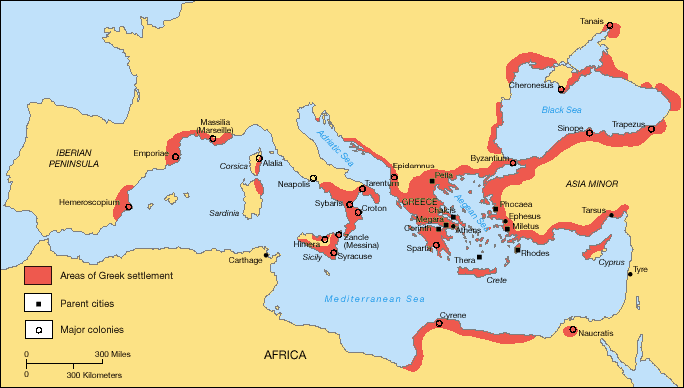
Location of Greek settlement in the ancient world, with the Greek colony of Massalia in southeastern Gaul.

The Greeks in pre-Roman Gaul have a significant history of settlement, trade, cultural influence, and armed conflict in the Celtic territory of Gaul (modern France), starting from the 6th century BC during the Greek Archaic period. Following the founding of the major trading post of Massalia in 600 BC by the Phocaeans at present day Marseille, Massalians had a complex history of interaction with peoples of the region. Large Greek colonies also existed west of the Rhône, particularly at Agde and Béziers, the latter of which both predates, and was larger than, the Marseille colony.

== Massalia ==
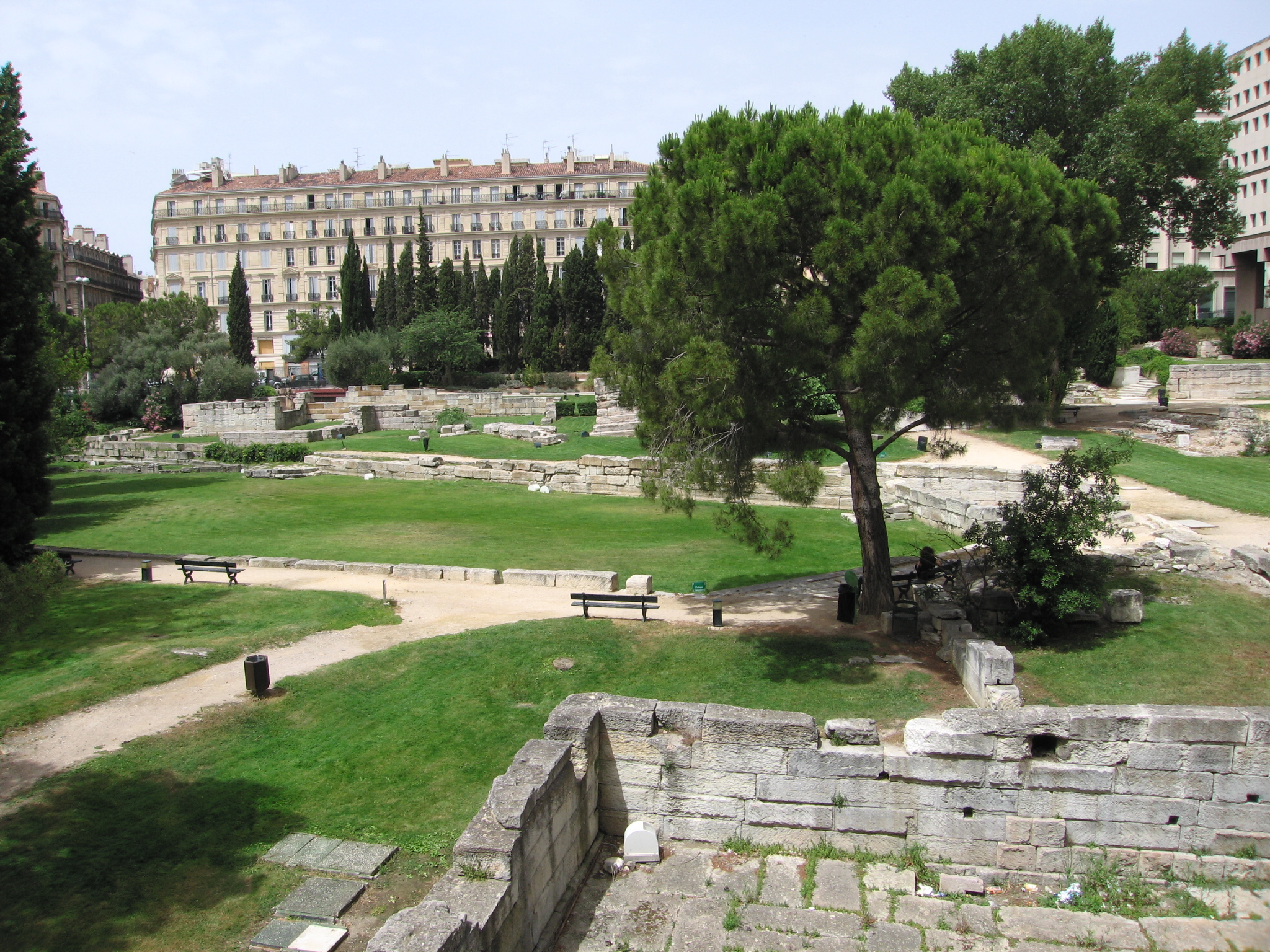
Remains of the Greek harbour in the Jardin des Vestiges in central Marseille, the most extensive Greek settlement in pre-Roman Gaul

The oldest city of modern France, Marseille, was founded around 600 BC by Greeks from the Asia Minor city of Phocaea (as mentioned by Thucydides Bk1,13, Strabo, Athenaeus and Justin) as a trading post or emporion (Greek: ἐμπόριον) under the name Μασσαλία (Massalia). More recently, the oldest phase of Béziers, known as "Béziers I", has been dated as anterior to the settlement of Marseille, making Marseille the second oldest Greek colony in France, though Béziers was temporarily abandoned some centuries after the founding of the Greek colony.

A foundation myth reported by several Greek and Latin authors (including Aristotle and Livy) recounts how the Phocaean hero Protis (son of Euxenus) married the Celtic princess Gyptis (or Petta) of the local Segobriges tribe, thus giving Protis the right to receive a piece of land where he was able to found a city. The contours of the Greek city have been partially excavated in several neighborhoods. The Phocaean Greeks introduced the cult of Artemis (specifically, the cult of the Ephesian version of Artemis, common in Ionia), as in their other colonies. The Phocaeans built a notable temple to Artemis in Massalia, which housed an idol of the goddess carved in the style of a xoanon.

It is thought that contacts started even earlier, however, as Ionian Greeks traded in the Western Mediterranean and Spain, but only very little remains from that earlier period. Contacts developed undisputedly from 600 BC, between the Celts and Celto-Ligurans and the Greeks in the city of Marseille and their other colonies such as Agde, Nice, Antibes, Monaco, Emporiae and Rhoda. The Greeks from Phocaea also founded settlements in the island of Corsica, such as at Alalia. From Massalia, the Phocaean Greeks also founded cities in northeastern Spain such as Emporiae and Rhoda.

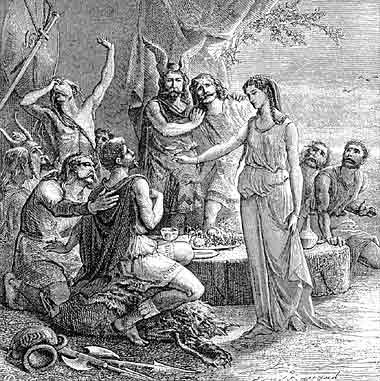
In legend, Gyptis, daughter of the king of the Segobriges, chose the Greek Protis, who then received a site for founding Massalia.

Before the Greeks came to pre-eminence in the Gulf of Lion, trade was mainly handled by Etruscans and Carthaginians. The Greeks of Massalia had recurrent conflicts with Gauls and Ligurians of the region, and engaged in naval battles against Carthaginians in the late 6th century (Thucydides 1.13) and probably in 490 BC, and soon entered into a treaty with Rome.

According to Charles Ebel, writing in the 1960s, "Massalia was not an isolated Greek city, but had developed an Empire of its own along the coast of southern Gaul by the fourth century". But the idea of a Massalian "empire" is no longer credible in the light of recent archaeological evidence, which shows that Massalia never even had a very large chora (agricultural territory under its direct control). However further archaeological evidence since shows Massalia had over twelve cities in its network in France, Spain, Monaco and Corsica. Cities Massalia founded that still exist today are Nice, Antibes, Monaco, Le Brusc, Agde, and Aleria. There is evidence of direct rule of at least two of their cities with a flexible system of autonomy as suggested by Emporion and Rhodus' own coin minting. Massalia's empire was not the same as the monolithic empires of the ancient world or of the nineteenth century, being a scattered group of cities connected by the sea and rivers. The Delian League was also a scattered group of cities spread far across the sea and became known as the Athenian Empire.

Massalia eventually became a centre of culture which drew some Roman parents to send their children there to be educated. According to earlier views, a purported Hellenization of Southern France prior to the Roman Conquest of Transalpine Gaul is thought to have been largely due to the influence of Massalia. The power and cultural influence of Massalia have been called into question by demonstrating the limited territorial control of the city and showing the distinctive cultures of indigenous societies. Local Gauls were not Grecophiles who wanted to imitate Greek culture, but peoples who selectively consumed a very limited range of Greek objects (mostly ceramic vessels for drink) that they incorporated into their own cultural practices according to their own systems of value.

== Greek trade in Gaul ==
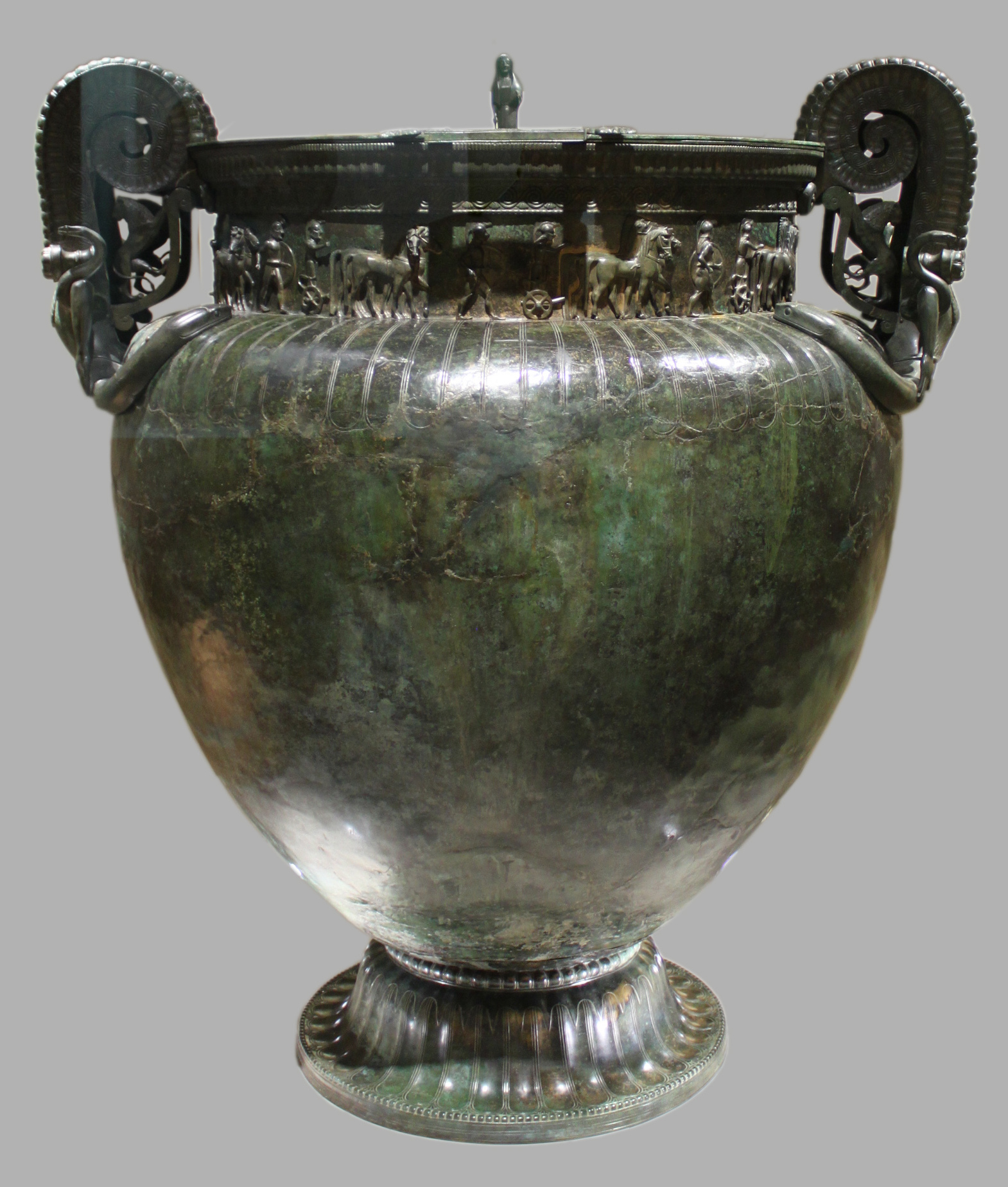
The Vix krater, an imported Greek wine-mixing vessel from 500 BC attests to the trade exchanges of the period

These eastern Greeks, established on the shores of southern France, were in close relations with the Celtic inhabitants of the region, and during the late 6th and 5th centuries BC Greek artifacts penetrated northwards along the Rhône and Saône valleys as well as the Isère. Massalian grey monochrome pottery has been discovered in the Hautes Alpes and as far north as Lons-le-Saunier, as well as three-winged bronze arrowheads as far as northern France, and amphorae from Marseille and Attic pottery at Mont Lassois. The site of Vix in northern Burgundy is a well-known example of a Hallstatt settlement where such Mediterranean objects were consumed, albeit in small quantities. Some, like the famous Vix krater, with 1.64 meters high, the largest bronze vessel of all antiquity.

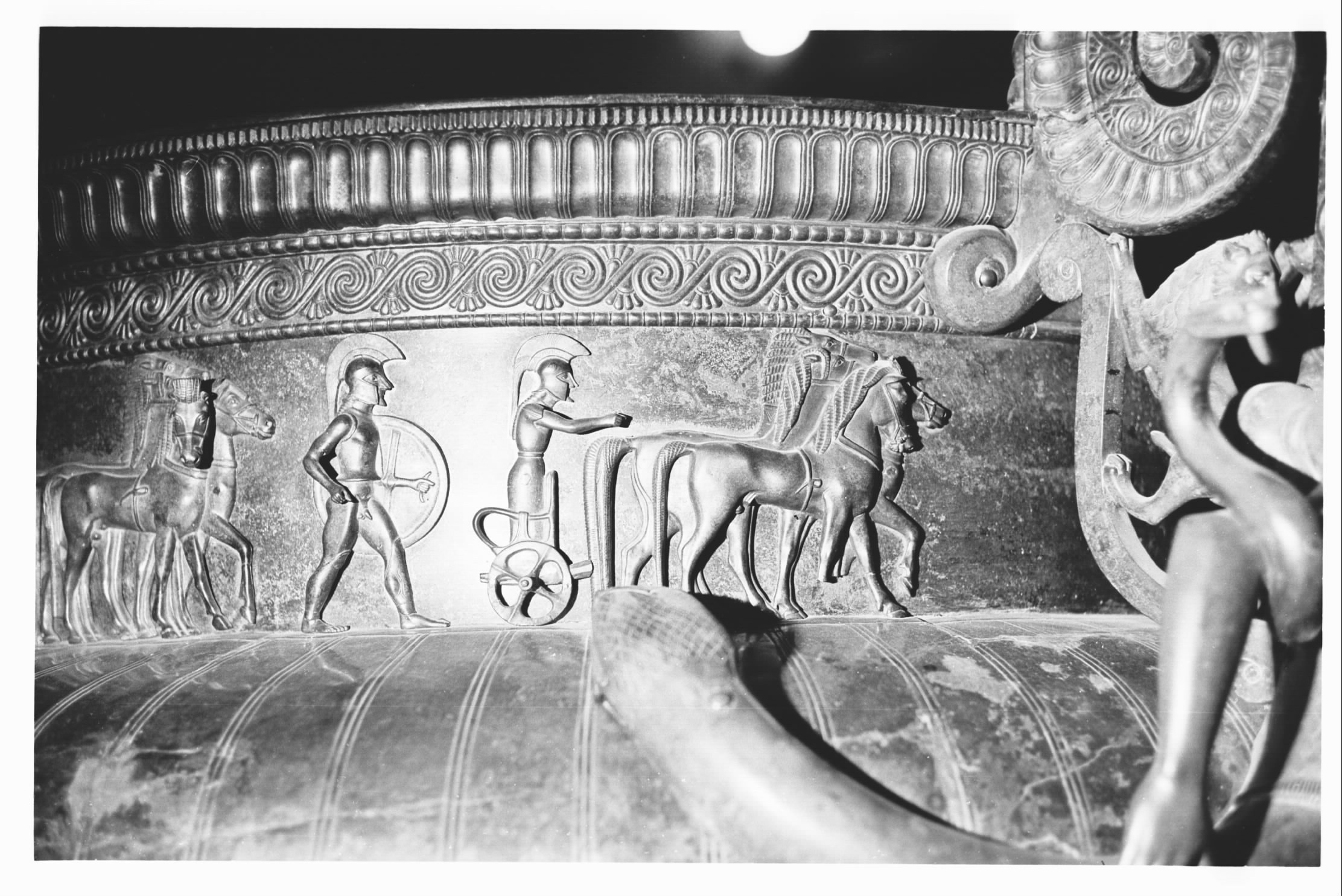
Detail from Vix krater: frieze of hoplites and four-horse chariots on the rim

From Massalia, maritime trade also developed with Languedoc and Etruria, and with the Greek city of Emporiae on the coast of Spain. Massalia traded as least as far as Gades and Tartessus on the western coast of the Iberian Peninsula, as described in the Massaliote Periplus, although this trade was probably blocked by the Carthaginians at the Pillars of Hercules after 500 BC.

The mother city of Phocaea would ultimately be destroyed by the Persians in 545, further reinforcing the exodus of the Phocaeans to their settlements of the Western Mediterranean. Trading links were extensive, in iron, spices, wheat and slaves. It has been claimed frequently that a trade in tin, indispensable for the manufacture of bronze, seems to have been established at that time between Cornwall in modern England, through the Channel, and along the Seine valley, Burgundy and the Rhône-Saône valleys to Marseille. However, the evidence for this is weak, at best.

=== Coinage ===
Coins in pre-Roman Gaul

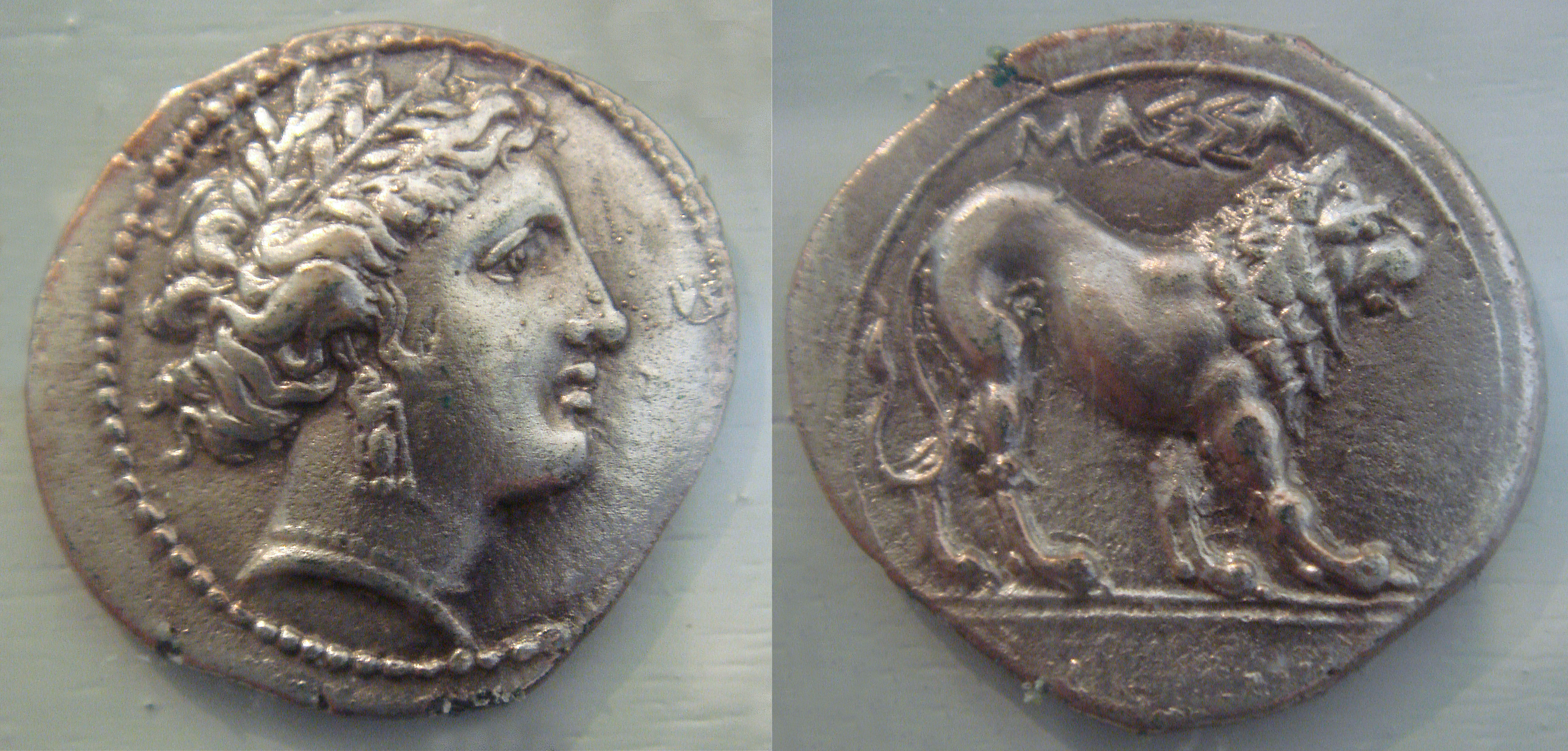
Massalian silver drachma 375–200 BC. Obv. head of Artemis, rev. lion, Greek inscription ΜΑΣΣΑ(ΛΙΑ), "Massalia".

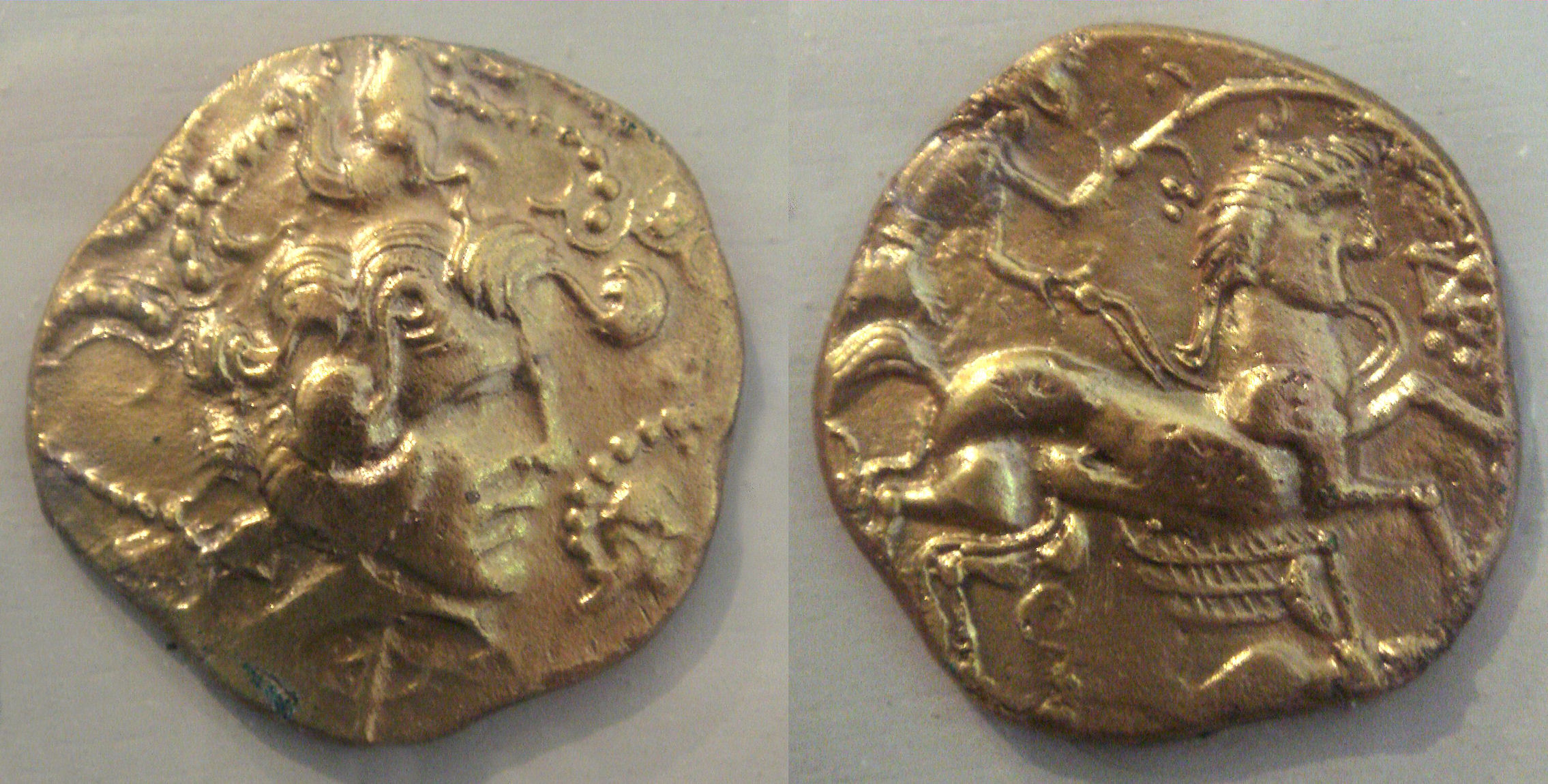
A coin of the Veneti, with head in profile and horse, derived from Greek coin designs, 5th–1st century BC

Celtic coinage emerged in the 4th century BC, and, influenced by trade with the Greeks and the supply of mercenaries to them, initially copied Greek designs. Celtic coinage was influenced by Greek designs, and Greek letters can be found on various Celtic coins, especially those of Southern France. Greek coinage occurred in the three Greek cities of Massalia, Emporiae and Rhoda, and was copied throughout southern Gaul.

Coins in northern Gaul were especially influenced by the coinage of Philip II of Macedon and his famous son Alexander the Great.

Celtic coins often retained Greek subjects, such as the head of Apollo on the obverse and two-horse chariot on the reverse of the gold stater of Philip II, but developed their own style from that basis, thus establishing a Graeco-Celtic synthesis.

After this first period in which Celtic coins rather faithfully reproduced Greek types, designs started to become more symbolic, as exemplified by the coinage of the Parisii in the region of northern France. By the 2nd century BC, the Greek chariot was only represented by a symbolic wheel.

The Armorican Celtic style in northwestern Gaul also developed from Celtic designs from the Rhine valley, themselves derived from earlier Greek prototypes such as the wine scroll and split palmette.

With the Roman conquest of Gaul, Greek-inspired Celtic coinage started to incorporate Roman influence instead, until it disappeared to be completely replaced by Roman coinage.

By the 1st century BC, the coinage of the Greeks of Marseille circulated freely in Gaul, also influencing coinage as far afield as Great Britain. The coins of the Sunbury hoard, thought to have been manufactured in Kent, show designs derived from Greek coins from Marseille with the stylised head of Apollo and a butting bull. Recently, original bronze coins from the 3rd or 2nd century BC from Greek Marseille have been found in several locations around Kent, UK.

==== Coins from the 5th to 1st century BC ====
Celtic coin designs progressively became more abstract, as is exemplified by the coins of the Parisii:

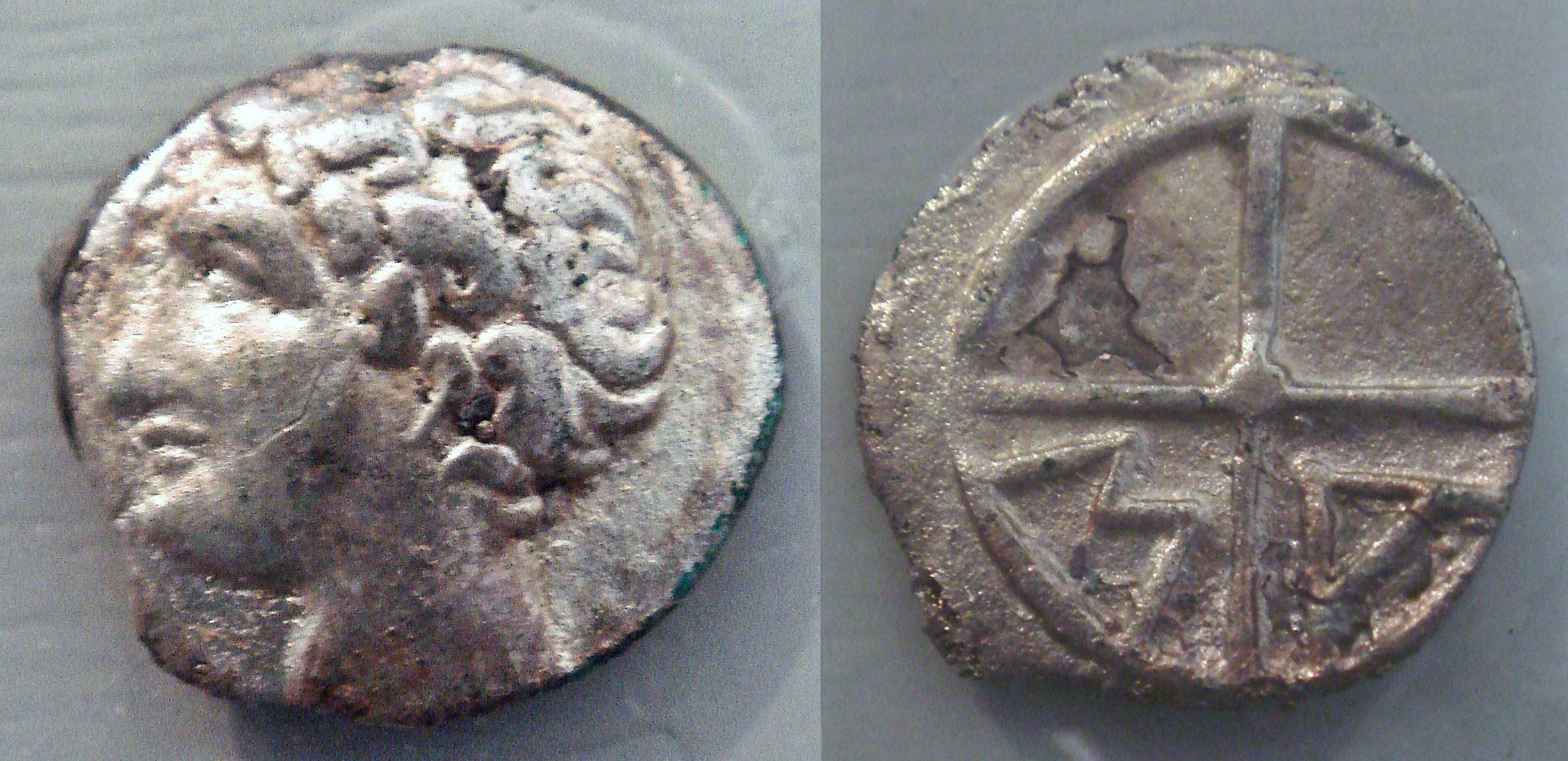
Massalia

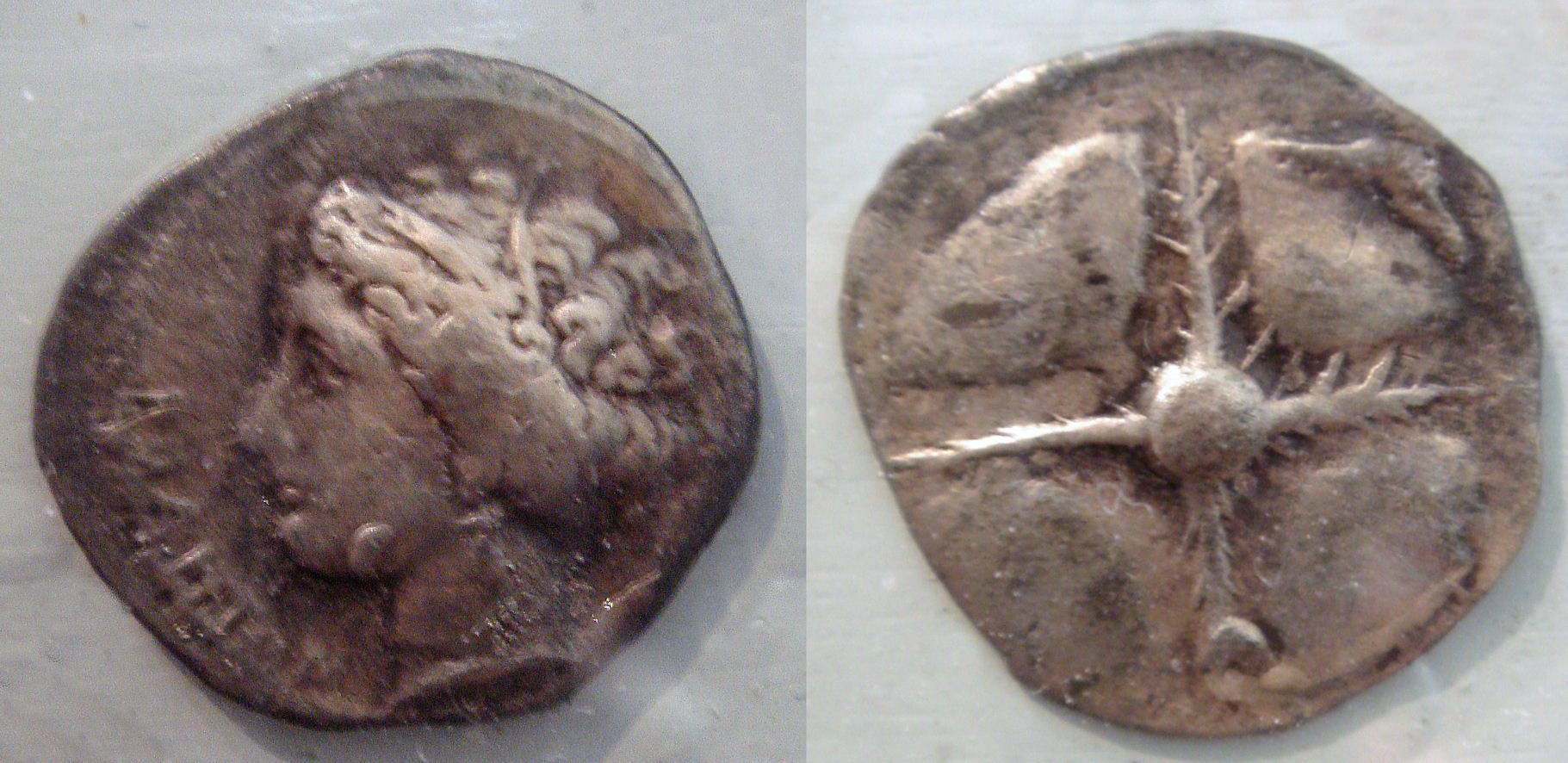
Rhoda

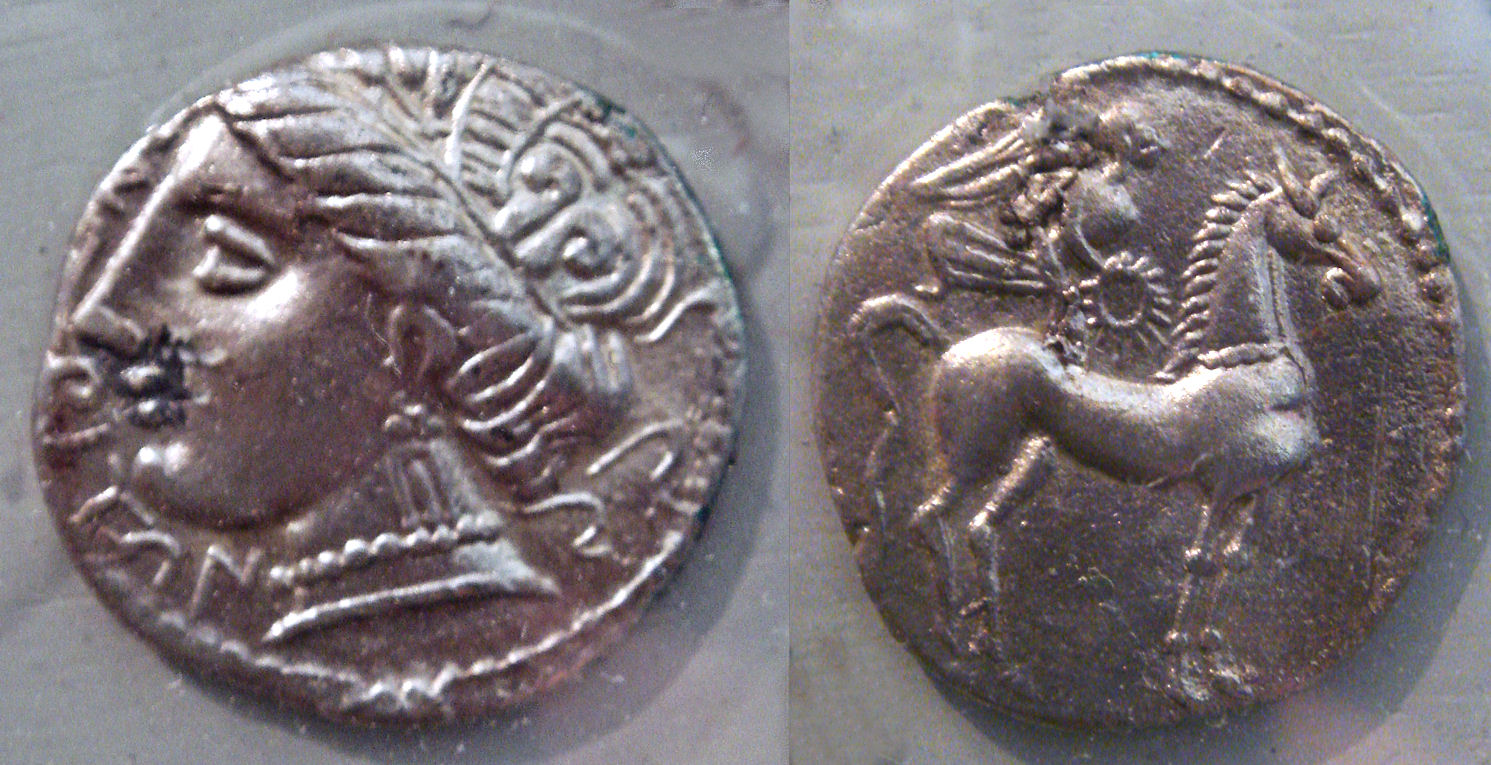
Emporiae

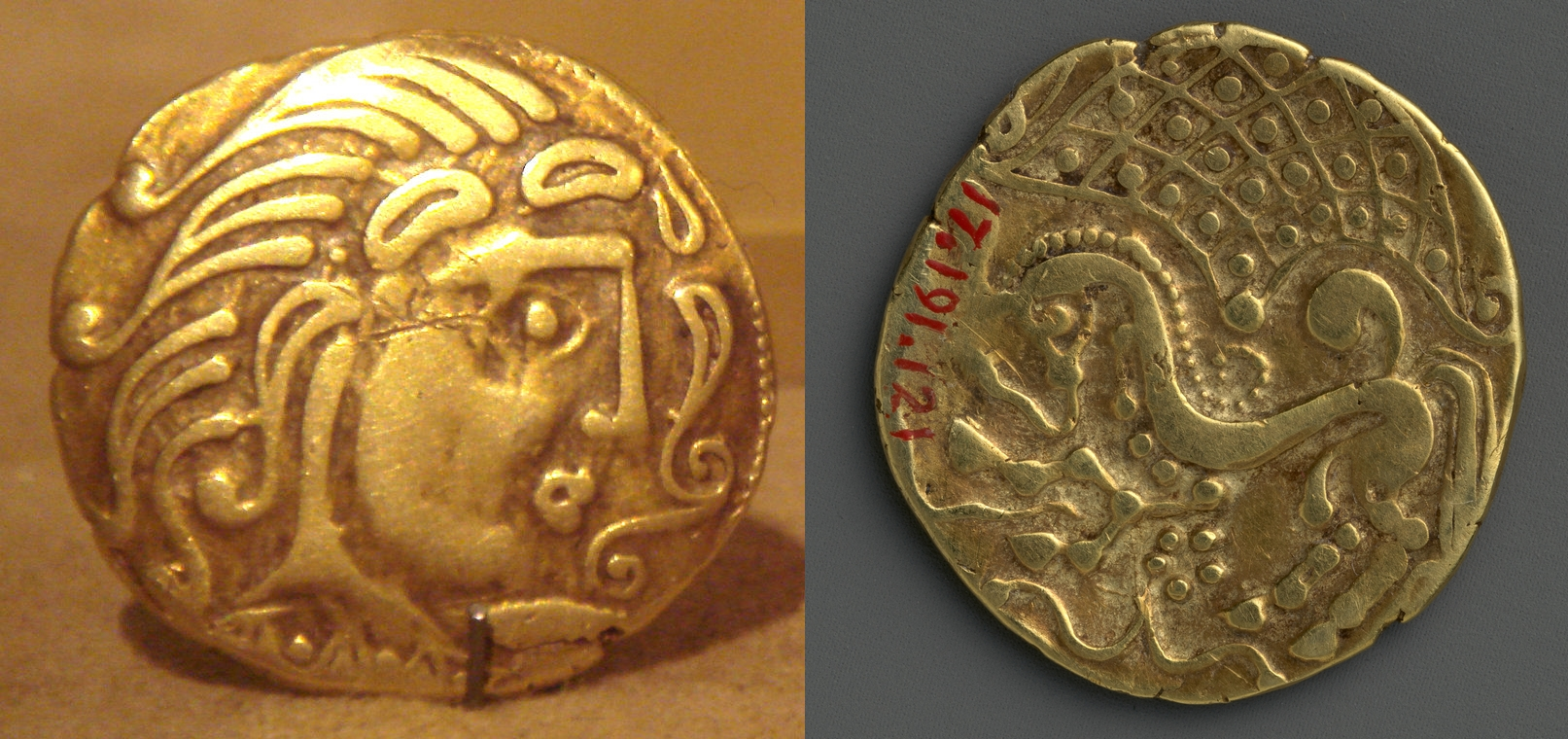
Parisii

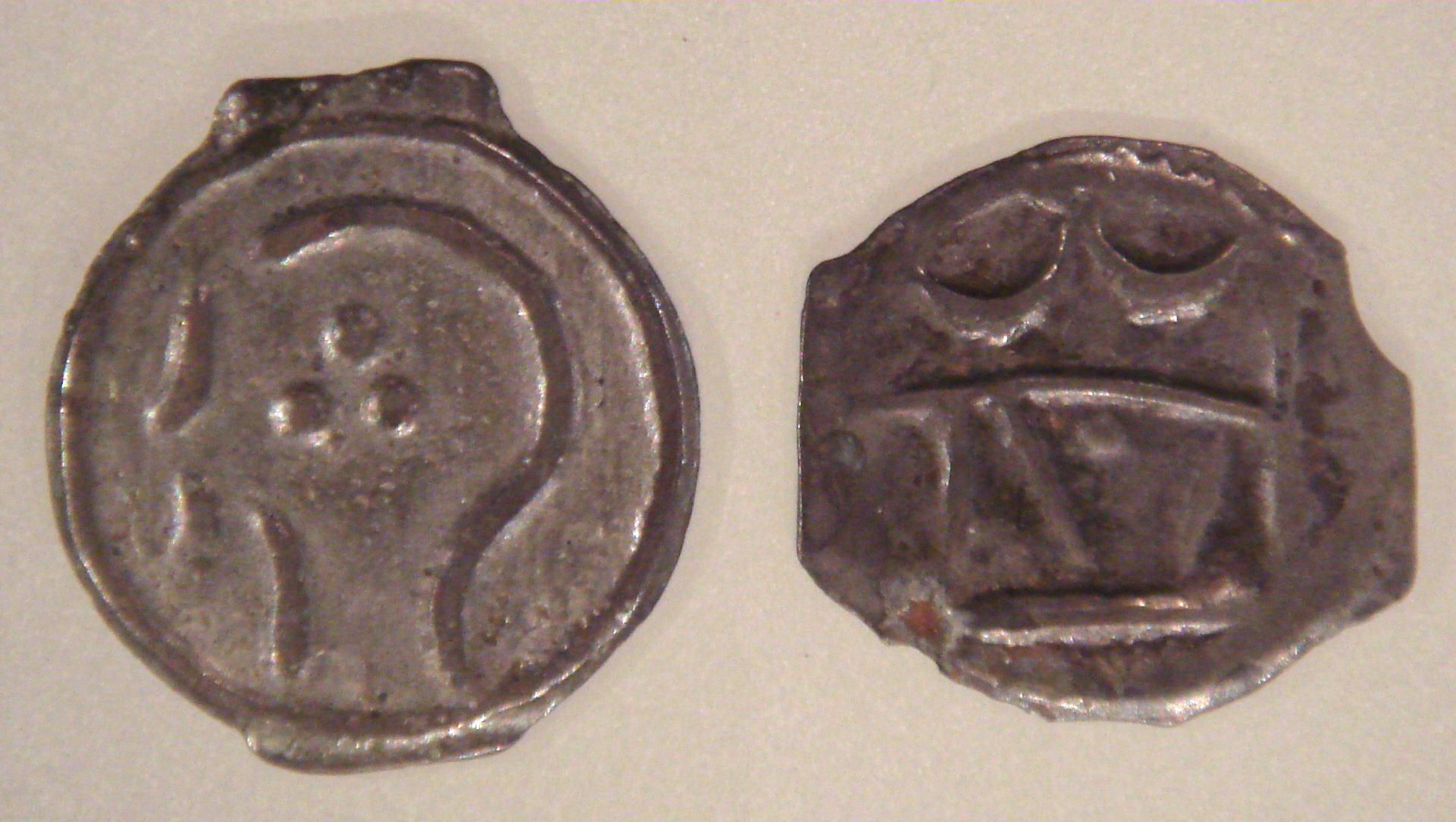
Sunbury-on-Thames, Britain, 100–50 BC
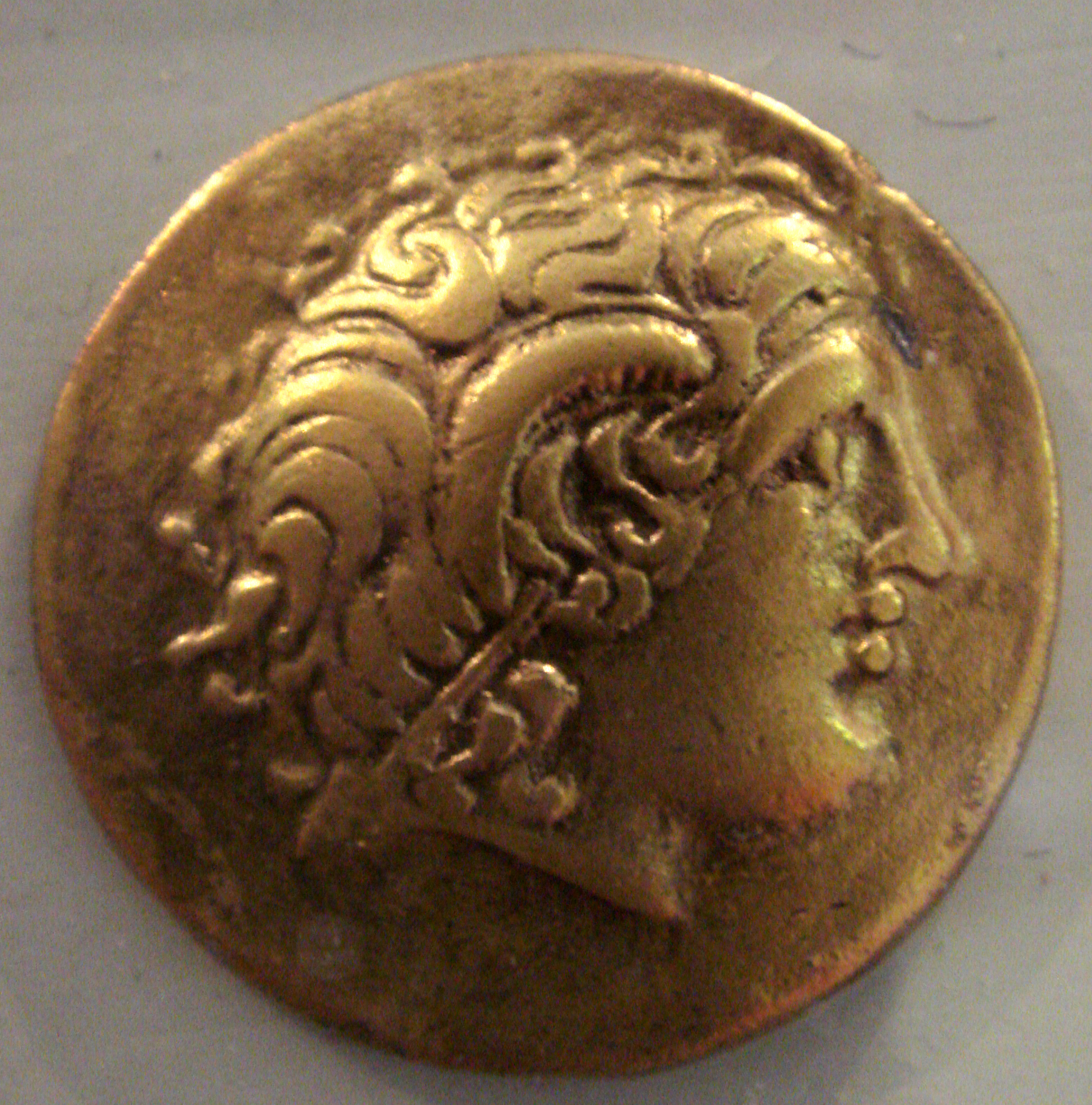
Gold coin of the Sequani
(based in present-day Franche-Comté)

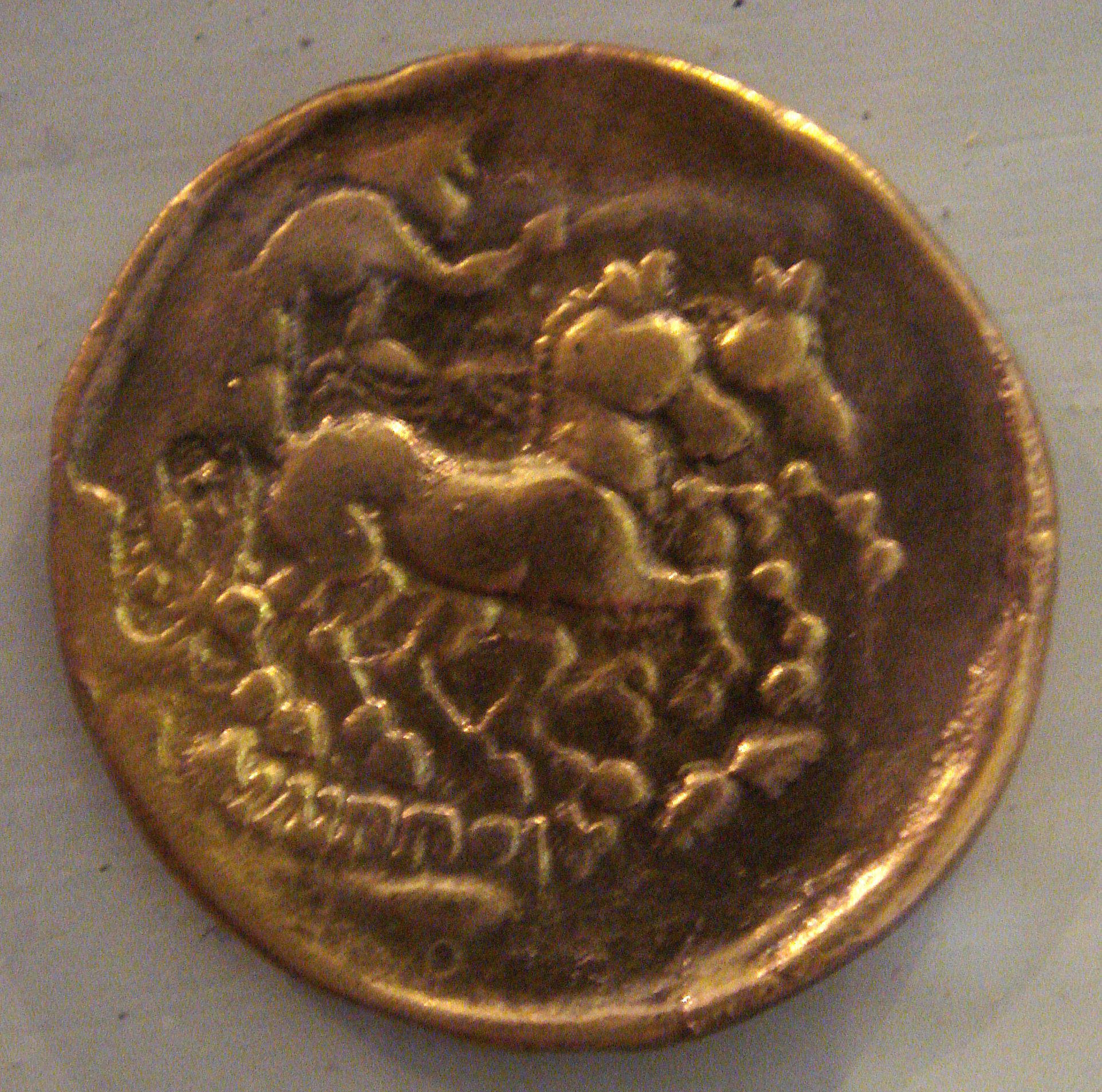
Biga and driver on a Sequanian coin

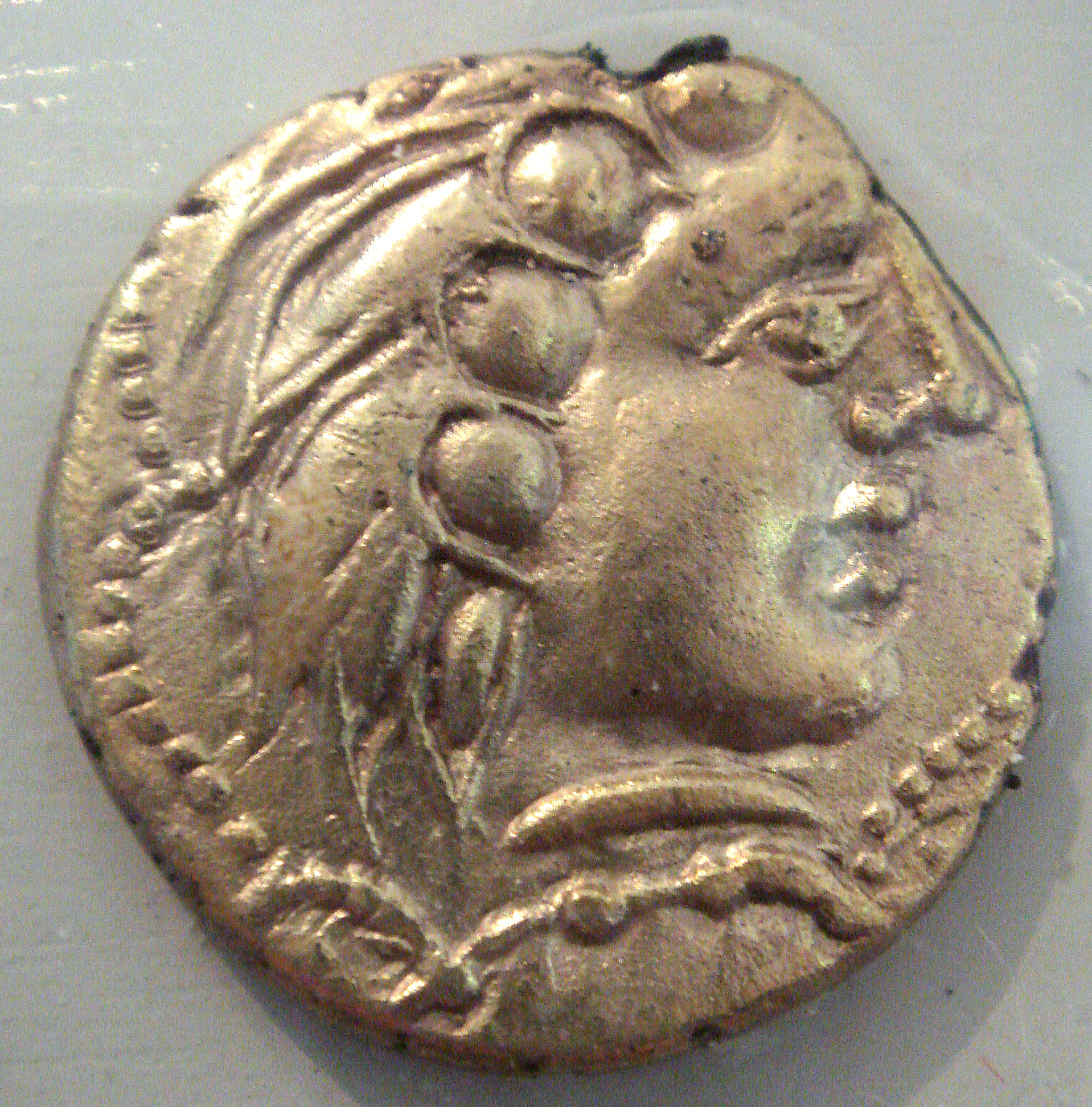
Santones (based in present-day Charente-Maritime)

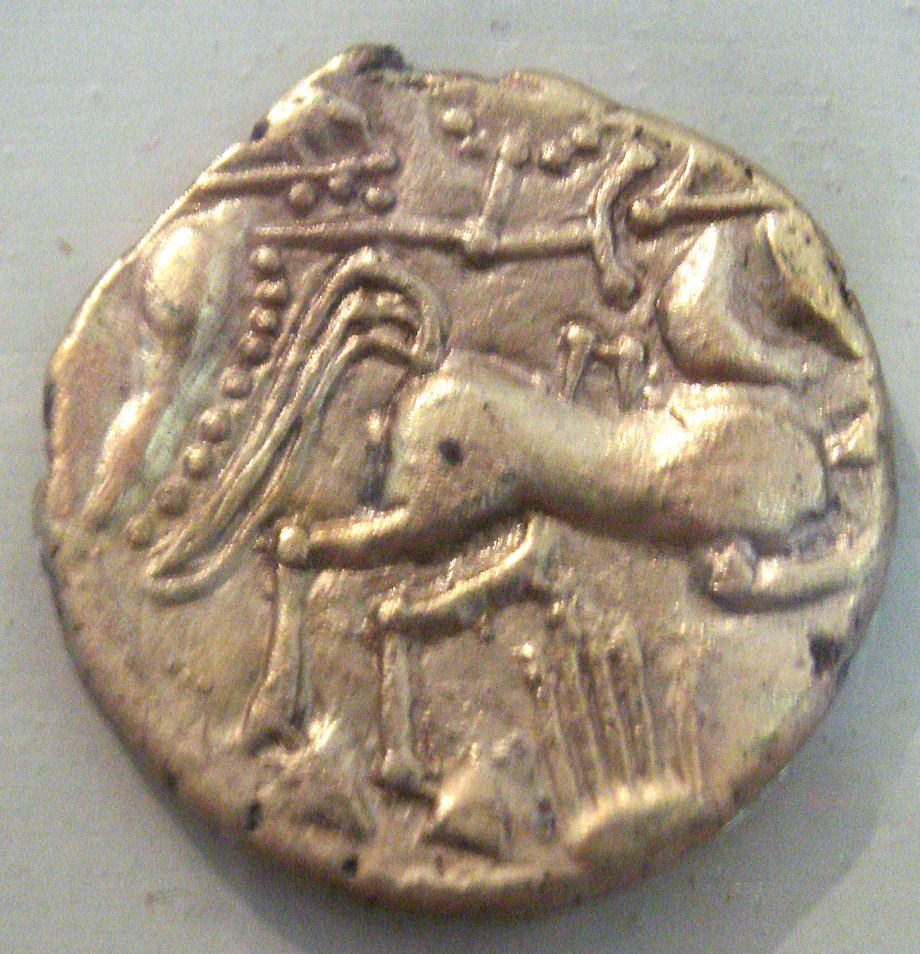
More abstract chariot and driver on Santonian coin

== Legacy ==
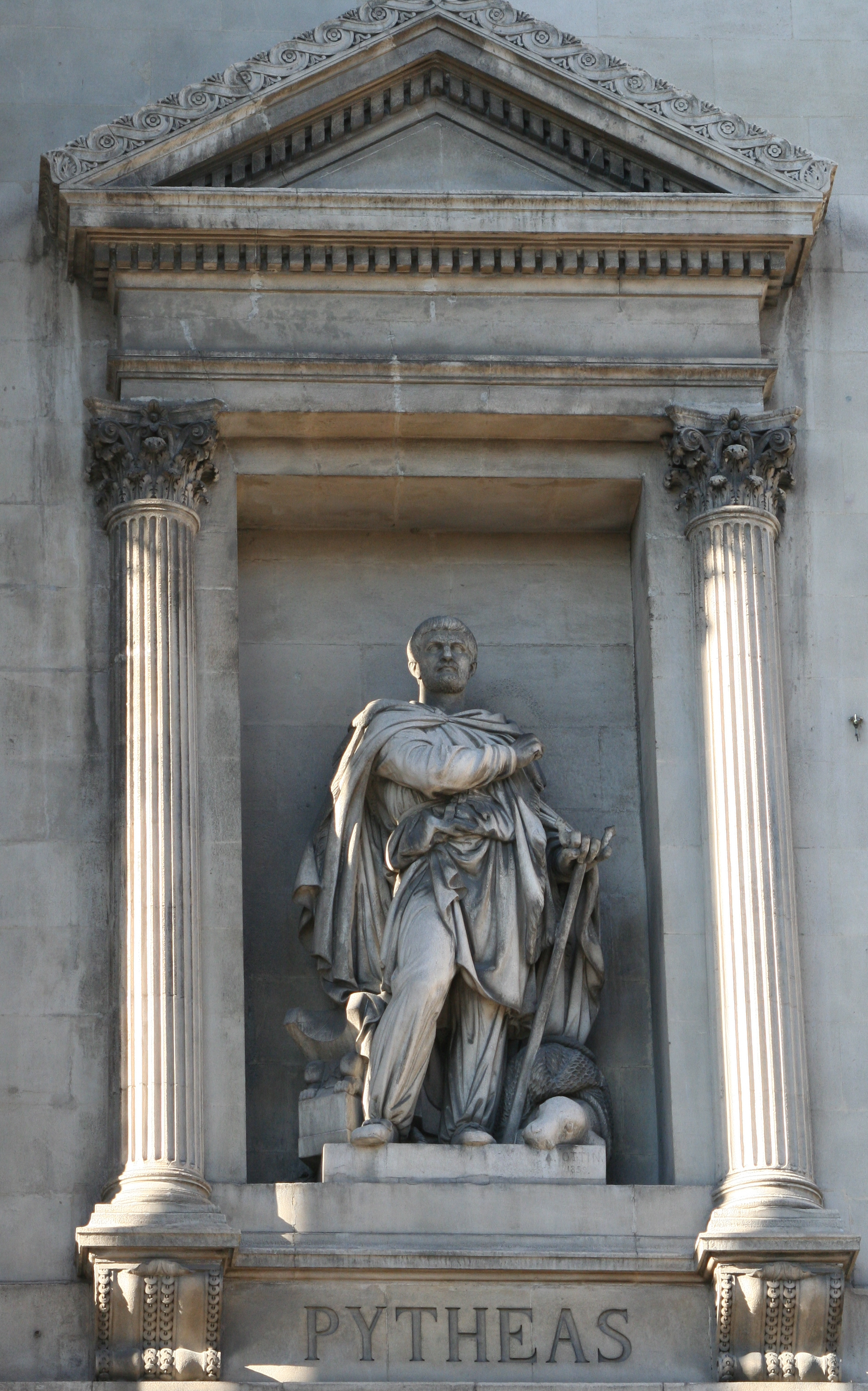
Statue of Greek explorer, Pytheas of Massilia, located on the exterior of the Palais de la Bourse. He explored northern Europe from Marseille c. 325 BC

Overland trade with Celtic countries beyond the Mediterranean region declined around 500 BC, in conjunction with the troubles following the end of the Halstatt civilization. The site of Mont Lassois was abandoned around that time.

The Greek colony of Massalia remained active in the following centuries. Around 325 BC, Pytheas (Ancient Greek Πυθέας ὁ Μασσαλιώτης) made a voyage of exploration to northwestern Europe as far as the Arctic Circle from his city of Marseilles. His discoveries contributed to the elaboration of the ancient world maps of Dicaearchus, Timaeus and Eratosthenes, and to the development of the parallels of latitude.

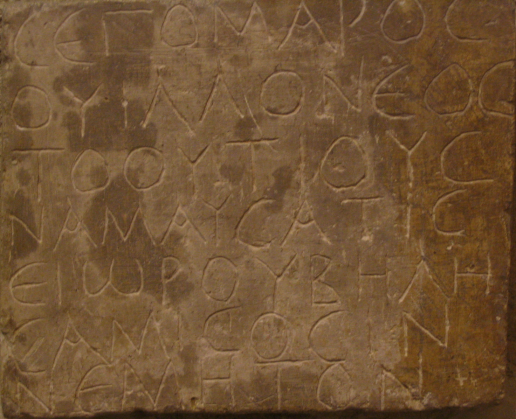
Tablet with Gallo-Greek inscription found south of Nîmes (Musée Calvet, Avignon)

The La Tène style, based on floral ornamentation, in contrast to the geometric styles of Early Iron Age Europe, can be traced to an imaginative re-interpretation of motifs on imported objects of Greek or Etruscan origin.

During his conquest of Gaul, Caesar reported that the Helvetii were in possession of documents in the Greek script, and Gaulish coins regularly used Greek script until about 50 BC.

== See also ==
- Emporion
- Ancient Greece
