= Nabarro =

Origin
- Origin: Spanish
- Region of origin: Spain

Other names
- Variant forms: Navarro, Navaro, Navarijo, Najara, Najera, and de Najera

Nabarro is a Spanish surname with the following spelling variations: Navarro (21st most common surname in Spain), Navaro, Navarijo, Najara, Najera, and de Najera. The formation of the surname suggests it to be a location surname originating in the ancient Kingdom of Navarre, formerly the Kingdom of Pamplona, which is a territory under the influence of Basque culture. Location surnames are thought to be due to the migration tendency in Europe during the Middle Ages to easily identify arrivals. The first recorded spelling of the family name is shown to be that of Francisco Navarro, which was dated January 1, 1510.

In the US, Nabarro ranked 37,299 as the most frequently occurring surname.

== Notable Nabarros ==
- David Nabarro (1949–2025), Senior UN System Coordinator for Avian and Human Influenza
- David Nunes Nabarro (1874–1958), British physician, bacteriologist and pathologist
- Frank Nabarro (1916–2006), English-born South African physicist, pioneer of solid-state physics
- Gerald Nabarro (1913–1973), British Conservative Member of Parliament of the 1950s and 60s

== See also ==
- Nabarro LLP, British law firm
