= Navarro =

Navarro may refer to:

== Places ==
- Navarro (Avilés), a parish in Avilés, Asturias, Spain
- Navarro, Buenos Aires, Argentina
  - Navarro Partido, the partido of Navarro, in Argentina
- Navarro, California, US; unincorporated community, formerly known as Wendling, California
- Navarro, Gurabo, Puerto Rico, US; a barrio
- Navarro, Texas, US
  - Navarro County, Texas, US
- Navarro, Tubajon, a barangay in the province of Dinagat Islands, Philippines

== Other uses ==
- Navarro (given name)
- Navarro (surname)
- Grenache or Navarro, a Spanish-French wine grape varietal
- Cinsaut or Navarro, a French red wine grape varietal
- The Navarros (band), a U.S. teen band
- Navarro (TV series), a drama series based on a French detective
- Navarro Discount Pharmacies, a pharmacy chain, photo service, and pharmacy benefit manager in the United States
- Navarro-Aragonese, a Medieval Romance language in the north of Spain
  - Navarrese, a dialect descended from Navarro-Aragonese

== See also ==
- Nevarro, a fictional planet in the Star Wars franchise
- Novarro (surname)
- Novaro (surname)
