= Navarro (surname) =

Origin
- Language: Basque
- Meaning: someone from Navarre
- Region of origin: Spain, France

Other names
- Variant form: Navarra

Navarro is a Spanish and French surname. Navarro is a habitational surname denoting someone from Navarre (Basque: Nafarroa) after the Kingdom of Pamplona took on the new naming in the high Middle Ages, while also keeping its original meaning of 'Basque-speaking person' in a broader sense, an ethnic surname. Ultimately the name is derived from the Basque word naba (meaning 'plain next to mountains').

== Notable people with the surname ==
- Aguas Santas Ocaña Navarro (born 1963), first lady of Honduras from 2002 to 2006
- Aida Navarro (born 1937), Venezuelan singer
- Alan Navarro (born 1981), English footballer
- Alejandro Navarro (politician) (born 1958), Chilean politician
- Alexis Navarro (1946–2016), Venezuelan politician, physician, and diplomat
- Ana Navarro (born 1971), Nicaraguan American political commentator
- Anna Navarro (1933–2006), American film and television actress
- Ángel Navarro (1748–1808), Spanish settler of Texas
- Australia Navarro (born 1961), Spanish politician
- Ben Navarro (born 1962/1963), American billionaire, founder and CEO of Sherman Financial Group, son of Frank
- Brenda Navarro (born 1982), Mexican writer
- Carla Suárez Navarro (born 1988), Spanish tennis player
- Carlos Arias Navarro (1908–1989), Spanish politician
- Cel-Xievionze Navarro (born 2006), Filipino former child actor
- Charles Navarro (1904–2005), American politician
- Christian Navarro (born 1991), American actor
- Chucho Navarro (1913–1993), Mexican singer
- Clarice Navarro, American politician
- Dafne Navarro (born 1996), Mexican trampoline gymnast
- Daniel Navarro (born 1983), Spanish cyclist
- Dan Navarro, Hispanic-American musician
- Dave Navarro (born 1967), Mexican-American rock guitarist, best known for playing in Jane's Addiction and Red Hot Chili Peppers
- David Navarro (disambiguation)
- Dioner Navarro (born 1984), Venezuelan baseball player
- Efrén Navarro (born 1986), Mexican-American baseball player
- Édgar Navarro (Paralympian) (born 1971), Mexican paralympic athlete
- Edgar Navarro (baseball) (born 1998), Venezuelan baseball player
- Eduardo de Almeida Navarro, Brazilian philologist and lexicographer
- Elvira Navarro (born 1978), Spanish writer
- Emma Navarro (born 2001), American tennis player
- Ernesto de la Guardia Navarro (1904–1983), President of Panama from 1956 to 1960
- Eugenio Navarro (1733–1810), Spanish military officer
- Fats Navarro (1923–1950), American jazz trumpet player
- Felipe Navarro García (1930–1994), nicknamed Yale, Spanish journalist
- Fernando Navarro (Spanish footballer) (born 1982)
- Francisco Yeste Navarro (born 1979), Spanish-Basque footballer and manager
- Franco Navarro (born 1961), Peruvian footballer, manager, and coach
- Frank Navarro (1931–2021), American football player and coach
- Guillermo Navarro (born 1955), Mexican cinematographer
- Hilario Navarro (born 1980), Argentine football goalkeeper
- Ibon Navarro (born 1976), Spanish basketball coach
- Iván Navarro (artist) (born 1972), Chilean artist
- Iván Navarro (tennis) (born 1981), Spanish tennis player
- Jason Navarro, American punk rock musician, vocalist in The Suicide Machines
- Javi Navarro (disambiguation), multiple people
- Johnny Navarro, British musician, vocalist and guitarist in Devilish Presley
- José Antonio Navarro (1795–1871), Texas statesman, revolutionary, and politician
- Juan Carlos Navarro (basketball) (born 1980), Spanish basketball player
- Juan Carlos Navarro (politician) (born 1961), Panamanian politician
- Juan José Navarro, 1st Marquess of Victoria (1687–1772), Captain General of the Spanish Navy
- Julio Navarro (astrophysicist) (born 1962), Argentinian professor of astronomy
- Julio Navarro (baseball) (1934–2018), Puerto Rican baseball player
- Luis Antonio García Navarro (1941–2001), Spanish conductor
- Kenn Navarro, Filipino-American animator of Happy Tree Friends
- Kimberly Navarro (born 1981), American ice dancer
- Manel Navarro (born 1996), Spanish singer
- María Celeste Giménez Navarro (born 1987), Argentine politician
- Mariano Navarro Rubio (1913–2001), Spanish politician
- Martina Navarro (born 2004), Argentine indoor hockey player
- Marysa Navarro (1934–2025), Spanish-American historian
- Millito Navarro (1905–2011), Puerto Rican baseball player
- Myriam Hernández Navarro (born 1967), Chilean singer-songwriter and television presenter
- Nancy Navarro (born 1965), Venezuelan-American politician in Maryland
- Natalia Navarro (born 1987), Miss Colombia 2009
- Nelson Navarro (born 1949), Curaçaoan politician
- Néstor Hugo Navarro (born 1934), Argentine Roman Catholic bishop
- Nicolás Navarro (Mexican footballer) (born 1963), Mexican football goalkeeper
- Nick Navarro (dancer) (born 1938), Mexican-American former dancer and choreographer
- Nick Navarro (sheriff) (1929–2011), Cuban-American sheriff and businessman
- Parker Navarro (born 2001), American football player
- Pedro Navarro, Count of Oliveto (c. 1460 – 1528), Spanish engineer and general
- Peter Navarro (born 1949), American economist, Director of the Office of Trade and Manufacturing Policy, Trump Administration
- Rafael Sánchez Navarro (born 1958), Spanish-Mexican actor
- Ray Navarro (1964–1990), American artist, filmmaker, and HIV/AIDS activist
- Robert Navarro (politician) (born 1952), French politician
- Robert Navarro (footballer) (born 2002), Spanish footballer
- Roberto Navarro (boxer) (born 1988), boxer from the Dominican Republic
- Roberto Navarro (journalist) (born 1959), Argentine journalist
- Rosita L. Navarro, Filipina president of Centro Escolar University in Manila
- Ryan Navarro (born 1994), American football player
- Samantha Navarro (born 1971), Uruguayan singer and composer
- Samuel Lewis Navarro (born 1957), Panamanian politician
- Sergio Navarro (footballer, born 1936), Chilean football player
- Sergio Navarro (footballer, born 1979), Spanish association football player and manager
- Tania Navarro Amo (born 1956), Spanish writer, LGBTQ activist
- Vhong Navarro (born 1977), Filipino actor, singer, and host
- Víctor Navarro, Venezuelan activist
- William Navarro (born 1997), Filipino basketball player
- Yamaico Navarro (born 1987), Dominicann baseball player
- Yvonne Navarro (born 1957), American author

== See also ==
- Novarro
- Novaro
