= Temple of Artemis (disambiguation) =

The Temple of Artemis at Ephesus is one of the Seven Wonders of the Ancient World.

Temple of Artemis may also refer to the following shrines dedicated to the Greek goddess Artemis:

- Temple of Artemis Amarynthia in Amarynthos in Euboea
- Temple of Artemis at Brauron, Attica
- Temple of Artemis in Corfu
- Temple of Artemis in Jerash
- Brauroneion on the Athenian Acropolis
- Sanctuary of Artemis Orthia at Sparta
- Temple of Artemis Azzanathkona at Dura-Europos
- Temple of Artemis Ephesia (Marseille) in Massalia

== See also ==
- Temple of Diana (disambiguation)
