= Temple of Diana =

Temple of Diana may refer to:

- Temple of Diana (Rome) in ancient Rome
- Temple of Diana (Nemi) in ancient Rome, on the shore of Lake Nemi
- Temple of Diana (Nîmes) in Nîmes, France
- Temple of Diana (Mérida) in Mérida, Spain
- Roman Temple of Évora in Portugal, sometimes referred to as Templo de Diana in Portuguese
- an organization of Dianic Wicca
- a supposed original religious building on the site now occupied by St Paul's Cathedral, London

== See also ==
- Temple of Artemis (disambiguation)
- Diana Temple (1925–2006), Australian pharmacologist
- Diana Temple (Grand Canyon), a landform in Coconino County, Arizona
