= Javi Navarro =

Javi Navarro may refer to:

- Javi Navarro (footballer, born 1974), Spanish football manager and former centre-back
- Javi Navarro (footballer, born 1997), Spanish football winger for Vaduz
- Javi Navarro (footballer, born 2007), Spanish football goalkeeper for Real Madrid
