= Néstor Hugo Navarro =

Argentine Roman Catholic bishop (born 1934)

The Most Reverend Néstor Hugo Navarro
- Bishop Emeritus of Alto Valle del Río Negro
- Church: Roman Catholic Church
- Diocese: Alto Valle del Río Negro
- Appointed: 19 March 2003
- Installed: 24 May 2003
- Retired: 10 February 2010
- Predecessor: José Pedro Pozzi
- Successor: Marcelo Alejandro Cuenca

Orders
- Ordination: 21 December 1968
- Consecration: 1 June 1998 by Rómulo García

Personal details
- Born: 26 March 1934 (age 92) Cabildo, Buenos Aires Province, Argentina
- Motto: Jesucristo, ayer, hoy y siempre

Néstor Hugo Navarro (born 26 March 1934) is an Argentine Roman Catholic prelate who served as bishop of the Diocese of Alto Valle del Río Negro from 2003 until his retirement in 2010. Before his appointment to that diocese, he served as an auxiliary bishop of Bahía Blanca and held several pastoral and administrative positions within the archdiocese.

== Biography ==
=== Early life and priesthood ===
Navarro was born on 26 March 1934 in Cabildo, in Buenos Aires Province, Argentina. He studied for the priesthood at the seminary in La Plata. He was ordained a priest on 21 December 1968.

Following his ordination, Navarro worked in parish ministry and social assistance. He served as vice-president of Caritas and held responsibilities in liturgical and catechetical activities within the Archdiocese of Bahía Blanca, including serving as vice-director and president of the relevant pastoral bodies. He also taught Catholic social doctrine and Sacred Scripture at a seminary. From 1992 to 1998, he served as vicar general of Bahía Blanca.

=== Episcopal ministry ===
On 15 April 1998, Pope John Paul II appointed Navarro titular bishop of Rotdon and auxiliary bishop of Bahía Blanca. He was consecrated a bishop on 1 June 1998 by Archbishop Rómulo García, with Archbishop Jorge Mayer and Bishop José María Arancedo serving as co-consecrators.

On 15 June 2002, he was appointed apostolic administrator of Bahía Blanca.

On 19 March 2003, Pope John Paul II appointed Navarro bishop of Alto Valle del Río Negro, succeeding José Pedro Pozzi, whose resignation had been accepted by the pope. The appointment was announced by the Holy See Press Office on 20 March 2003. Navarro took possession of the diocese and began his pastoral ministry as its second bishop on 24 May 2003.

On 10 February 2010, Pope Benedict XVI accepted Navarro's resignation from the pastoral governance of the Diocese of Alto Valle del Río Negro, in accordance with canon 401 §1 of the Code of Canon Law. He was succeeded by Marcelo Alejandro Cuenca and thereafter held the title of bishop emeritus.

=== Activities during the military dictatorship ===
Before his episcopal appointment, Navarro served in parish ministry in Bahía Blanca during the National Reorganization Process, Argentina's military dictatorship of 1976–1983. According to his testimony reported in October 2011, he had been appointed in August 1975 to lead the Nuestra Señora del Carmen parish in the Sánchez Elías neighbourhood of Bahía Blanca.

Navarro also worked with Caritas and assisted political refugees arriving from Chile, sometimes in cooperation with Methodist pastor Aníbal Sicardi. He recounted threats and attacks against people and institutions associated with his parish and described the disappearance of members of the local Catholic community during the dictatorship.

On 25 October 2011, Navarro testified in proceedings concerning crimes against humanity committed in the area under the operational control of the Argentine Army's V Corps. His testimony included his account of Santiago Cruciani, an intelligence operative who used the alias Mario Mancini and had infiltrated the parish community. Navarro described Cruciani as having become familiar within the community. He also discussed his contacts with relatives of disappeared people and the difficulties he faced in responding to their requests for assistance.
