= Diocese of Alto Valle del Río Negro =

Latin Catholic territory in Argentina

Coordinates: 39.0274°S 67.5737°W

Diocese of Alto Valle Del Rio Negro Dioecesis Rivi Nigri Vallensis Superioris Diócesis de Alto Valle del Río Negro

Catholic

Location
- Country: Argentina
- Ecclesiastical province: Bahía Blanca
- Metropolitan: Bahía Blanca

Statistics
- Area: 37,130 sq mi (96,200 km^{2})
- Population: Total; Catholics: (as of 2012); 325,447; 276,629 (85%)
- Parishes: 18

Information
- Denomination: Catholic Church
- Sui iuris church: Latin Church
- Rite: Roman Rite
- Established: 22 July 1993 (33 years ago)
- Cathedral: Cathedral of Our Lady of Mount Carmel in General Roca
- Patron saint: Holy Family

Current leadership
- Pope: Leo XIV
- Bishop: sede vacante
- Metropolitan Archbishop: Carlos Alfonso Azpiroz Costa
- Bishops emeritus: Marcelo Alejandro Cuenca Bishop Emeritus (2010-2021); Néstor Hugo Navarro Bishop Emeritus (2003-2010)

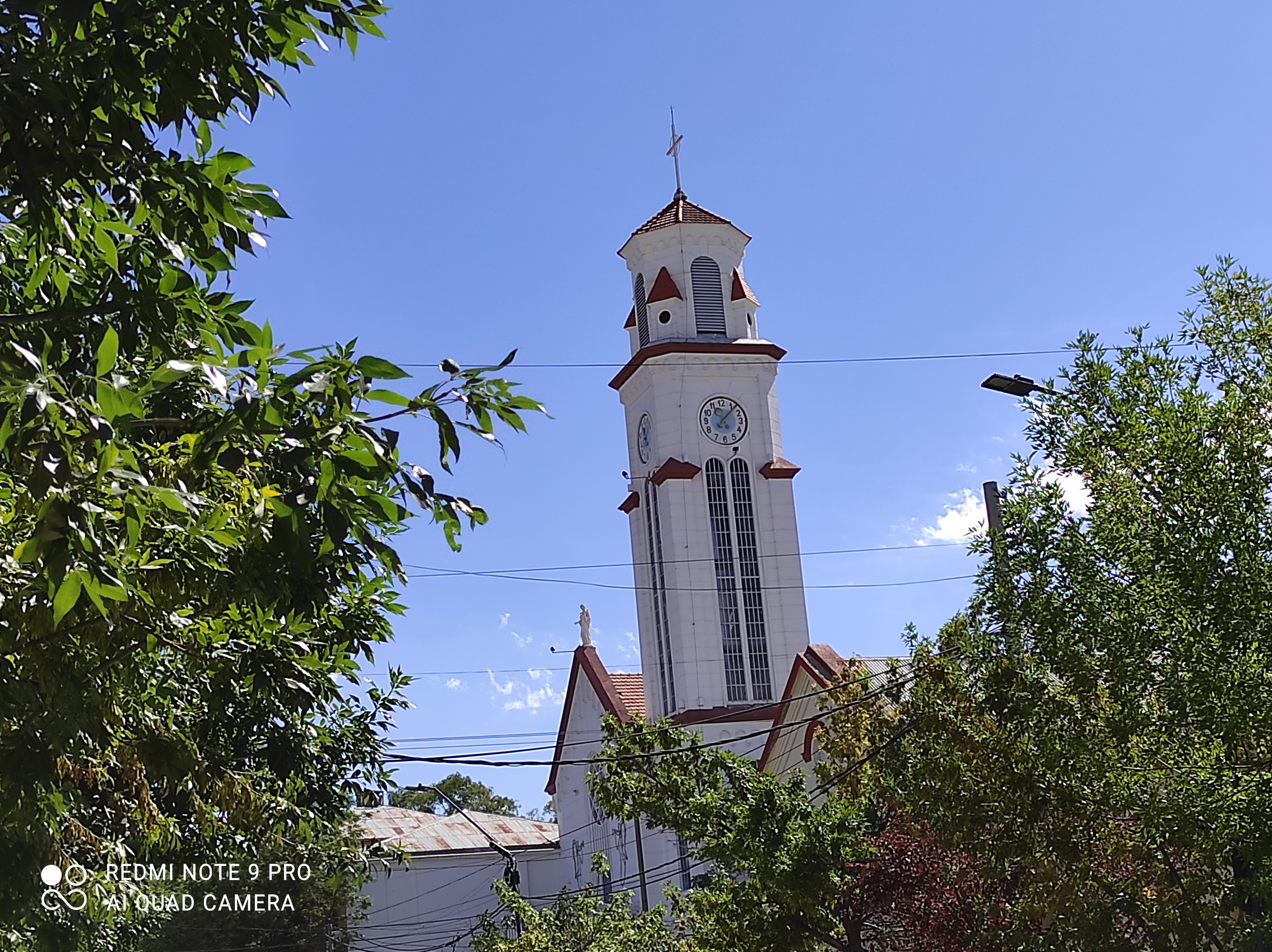

The Diocese of Alto Valle del Río Negro is a Latin Church diocese of the Catholic Church in Argentina. Erected on 22 July 1993, it is a suffragan diocese of the Archdiocese of Bahía Blanca.

== Ordinaries ==
- José Pedro Pozzi, S.D.B. (1993–2003)
- Néstor Hugo Navarro (2003–2010)
- Marcelo Alejandro Cuenca (2010–2021)
- Alejandro Pablo Benna (2021–2025)
