= Navarrus =

Navarrus (Spanish: Navarro; French: Navarre) is medieval given name. It may refer to:

- Navarrus, viscount of Dax killed in 1089
- Navarrus (bishop of Coria and Salamanca) (1142–1158/9)
- Navarrus of Acqs, bishop of Couserans (1208–1211)

== See also ==
- Martín de Azpilcueta (1492–1586), called Doctor Navarrus
- Navarro (disambiguation)
