= José Pedro Pozzi =

Brazilian Roman Catholic prelate

José Pedro Pozzi S.D.B.
- Bishop of Alto Valle del Río Negro
- Native name: Giuseppe Pietro Pozzi
- Church: Catholic Church
- Diocese: Diocese of Alto Valle del Río Negro
- In office: 22 July 1993 – 19 March 2003
- Predecessor: Diocese erected
- Successor: Néstor Hugo Navarro

Orders
- Ordination: 25 November 1951 by Fermín Emilio Lafitte
- Consecration: 25 September 1993 by Agustín Roberto Radrizzani

Personal details
- Born: 12 July 1925 Vimercate, Province of Milan, Kingdom of Italy
- Died: 26 November 2017 (aged 92) General Roca, Río Negro Province, Argentina

José Pedro Pozzi, S.D.B. (12 July 1925 – 26 November 2017) was a Brazilian Catholic prelate.

Born in Vimercate, Italy, as Giuseppe Pietro Pozzi, he joined the Salesians and was ordained to the priesthood in 1951. He served as the Bishop of Alto Valle del Río Negro from 1993 until he retired in 2003. He died on 26 November 2017 in General Roca, Río Negro, at the age of 92.
