= Najara =

Najara can stand for:

- Najara, a character from television series Xena: Warrior Princess,
- Nájera, a town in Spain
- Rabbi Israel ben Moses Najara, a famous Jewish poet and biblical commentator
