= Vix, Côte-d'Or =

Vix
- Commune
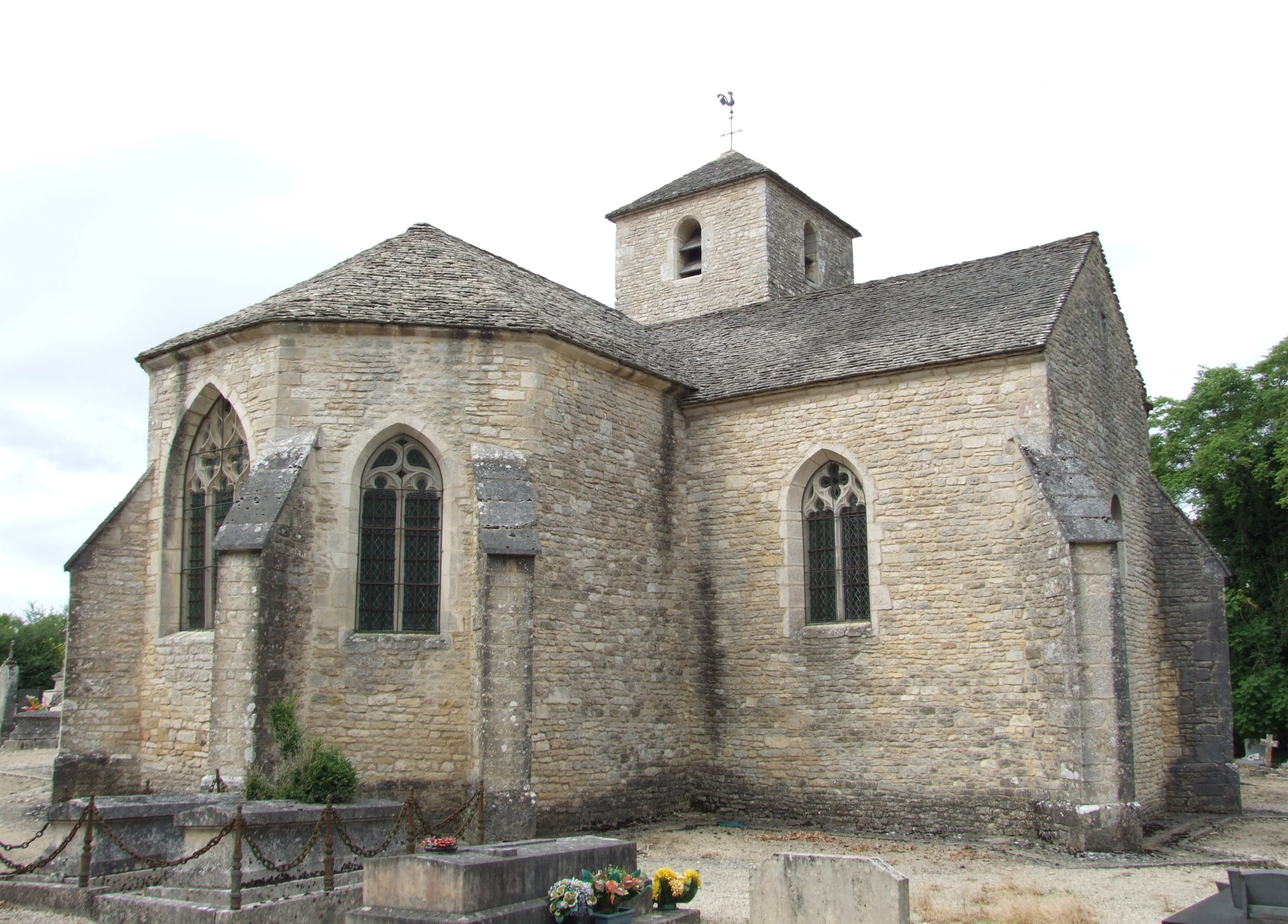
- The church in Vix

- Coat of arms
- Location of Vix
- Location within France Location within Bourgogne-Franche-Comté
- Coordinates: 47°54′22″N 4°32′24″E
- Country: France
- Region: Bourgogne-Franche-Comté
- Department: Côte-d'Or
- Arrondissement: Montbard
- Canton: Châtillon-sur-Seine
- Intercommunality: Pays Châtillonnais

Government
  - Mayor (2022–2026): Benigne Scordel
- Area^{1}: 3.53 km^{2} (1.36 sq mi)
- Elevation: 328 m (1,076 ft)
- Highest elevation: 306 m (1,004 ft)
- Lowest elevation: 196 m (643 ft)
- Population (2023): 94
  - Density: 27/km^{2} (69/sq mi)
- Time zone: UTC+01:00 (CET)
  - Summer (DST): UTC+02:00 (CEST)
- INSEE/Postal code: 21711 /21400
- ^{1} French Land Register data, which excludes lakes, ponds, glaciers > 1 km^{2} (0.386 sq mi or 247 acres) and river estuaries.

Vix (French pronunciation: [vi(ks)]) is a commune in the Côte-d'Or department in eastern France.

== Archaeology ==
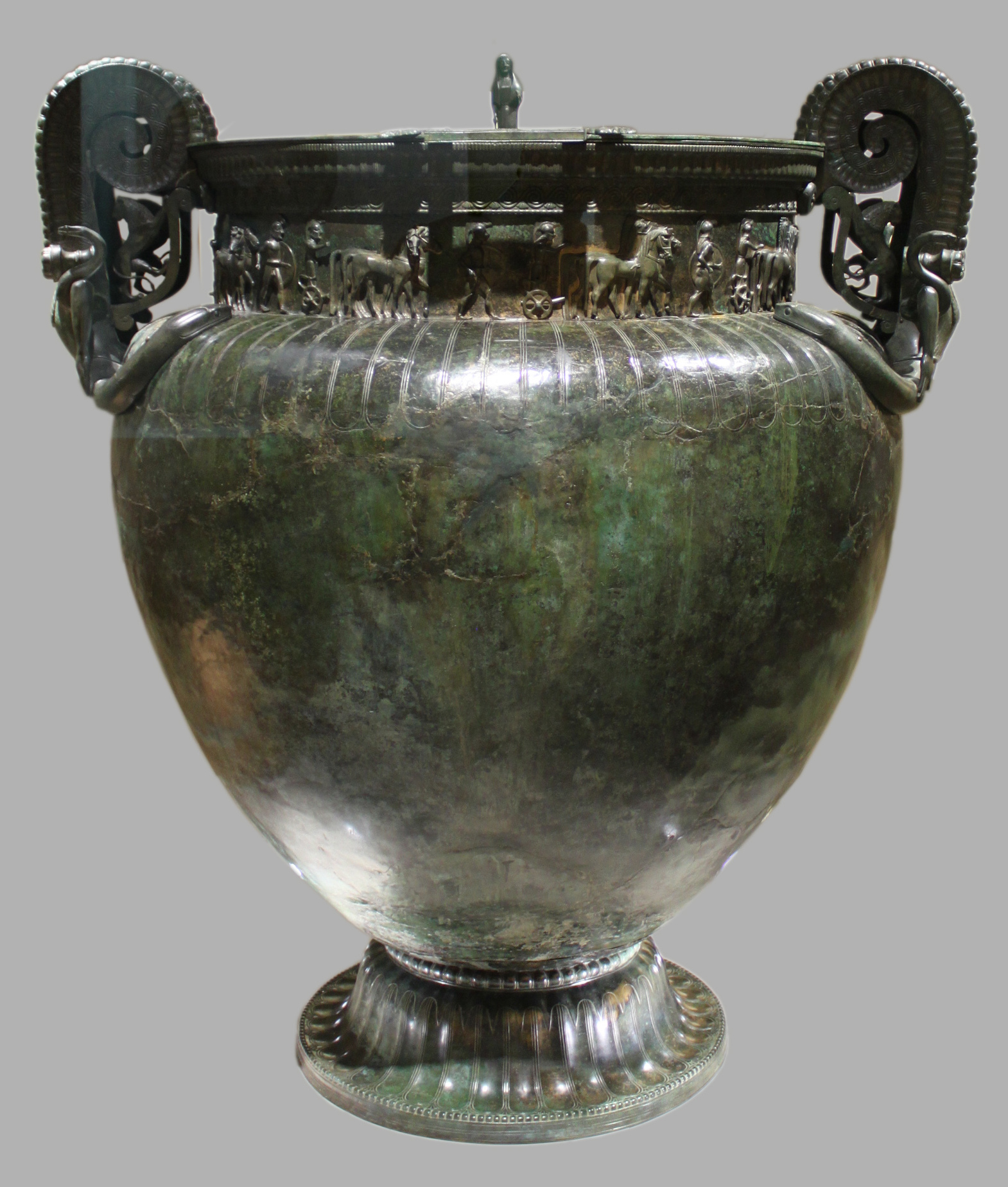
The Vix Krater, an imported Greek wine-mixing vessel found in the famous grave of the "Lady of Vix"

The area around the village of Vix is the site of an important prehistoric complex from the Celtic Late Hallstatt and Early La Tène periods, comprising an important fortified settlement and several burial mounds. The most famous of the latter, the Vix Grave, also known as the grave of the Lady of Vix, dates to circa 500 BC. Her grave had never been looted and contained remarkably rich grave offerings, including a great deal of jewellery and the Vix krater, the largest known metal vessel from antiquity.

== Population ==
Historical population
Year	Pop.	±% p.a.
1968	85	—
1975	85	+0.00%
1982	81	−0.69%
1990	95	+2.01%
1999	107	+1.33%
2007	108	+0.12%
2012	111	+0.55%
2017	107	−0.73%
2023	94	−2.14%
Source: INSEE

== See also ==
- Communes of the Côte-d'Or department
- Girart de Roussillon
