= Javi Navarro (footballer, born 2007) =

Spanish footballer

Personal information
- Full name: Javier Navarro Jiménez
- Date of birth: 25 January 2007 (age 19)
- Place of birth: Madrid, Spain
- Height: 1.86 m (6 ft 1 in)
- Position: Goalkeeper

Team information
- Current team: Real Madrid B
- Number: 13

Youth career
- 2019–2025: Real Madrid

Senior career*
Years	Team	Apps	(Gls)
2025–	Real Madrid B	3	(0)
2025	Real Madrid C	3	(0)
2026–	Real Madrid	0	(0)

International career^{‡}
2026–	Spain U19	1	(0)
Medal record
Men's football
Representing Spain
UEFA European Under-19 Championship
Winner	2026 Wales
- * Club domestic league appearances and goals as of 10:40, 15 April 2026 ‡ National team caps and goals as of 27 March 2026

Javier Navarro Jiménez (born 25 January 2007) is a Spanish professional footballer who plays as a goalkeeper for Primera Federación club Real Madrid Castilla

== Club career ==
=== Early years ===
In around 2019, Javier joined his first youth club, Real Madrid, at age 12. He kept rising through the youth ranks as he was seen as one of the best goalkeepers in his level.

=== Real Madrid ===
In late 2025, Javi got his first call up to Castilla and made his debut on September 27, 2025, against Tenerife that ended in a 1–3 loss away. He continued to sit on the bench for Castilla, but he eventually got his second chance where he drew 2–2 against Zamora away. On April 13, 2026, Javier got his first training invite with the first team and was included in the return game against Bayern Munich.

== International career ==
On March 27, 2026, Javier got his first international call-up with Spain U19 and made his debut in the March international break.

== Honours ==
Spain U19

- UEFA European Under-19 Championship: 2026
