= Roses, Spain =

Roses
- Municipality
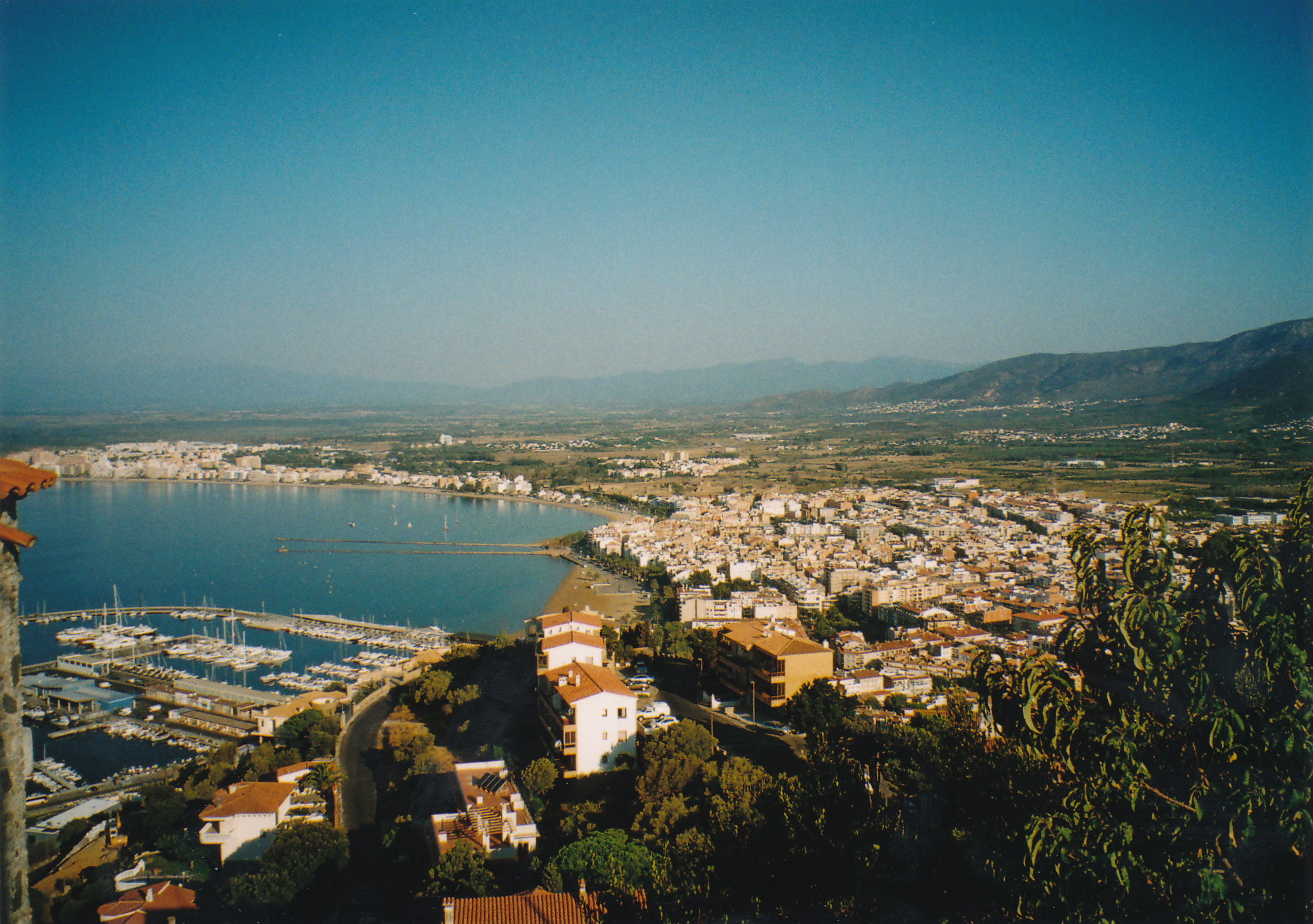

- Flag Coat of arms

- Location in Catalonia Roses (Spain)
- Coordinates: 42°15′47″N 3°10′59″E
- Country: Spain
- Community: Catalonia
- Province: Girona
- Comarca: Alt Empordà

Government
  - Mayor: Josep M. Martínez Chinchilla (2025)

Area
  - Total: 45.9 km^{2} (17.7 sq mi)
- Elevation: 5 m (16 ft)

Population (2025-01-01)
  - Total: 20,365
  - Density: 444/km^{2} (1,150/sq mi)
- Demonym: Rosinques
- Postal code: 17480
- Website: www.roses.cat

Roses (Catalan pronunciation: [ˈrɔzəs]; Spanish: Rosas, [ˈrosas]) is a municipality in the comarca of the Alt Empordà, located on the Costa Brava, Catalonia, Spain.

Roses is the site of the former bishopric of Rotdon, now a Latin Catholic titular see. It is situated on the coast at the northern end of the Gulf of Roses, and is an important fishing port and tourist centre. The C-260 road links the town with Figueres.

The GR 92 long distance footpath, which roughly follows the length of the Mediterranean coast of Spain, has a staging point at Roses. Stage 3 links northwards to Cadaqués, a distance of 21.7 kilometres (13.5 mi), whilst stage 4 links southwards to the El Cortalet pond in the Parc Natural dels Aiguamolls de l'Empordà, a distance of 16.3 kilometres (10.1 mi).

== Geology ==
The southern part of the municipality of Roses is underlain by Variscan granodiorite, with some spectacular exposures of this rock along the coastline. The granodiorite becomes mylonitic in shear zones in this sector. The northern and eastern parts are underlain by Ediacaran and Cambrian metasediments, including black schist and marble. The low-lying western part of the municipality is an area of geologically recent Quaternary deposits (clay, silt, sand, etc), laid down by rivers and in lakes and marshes.

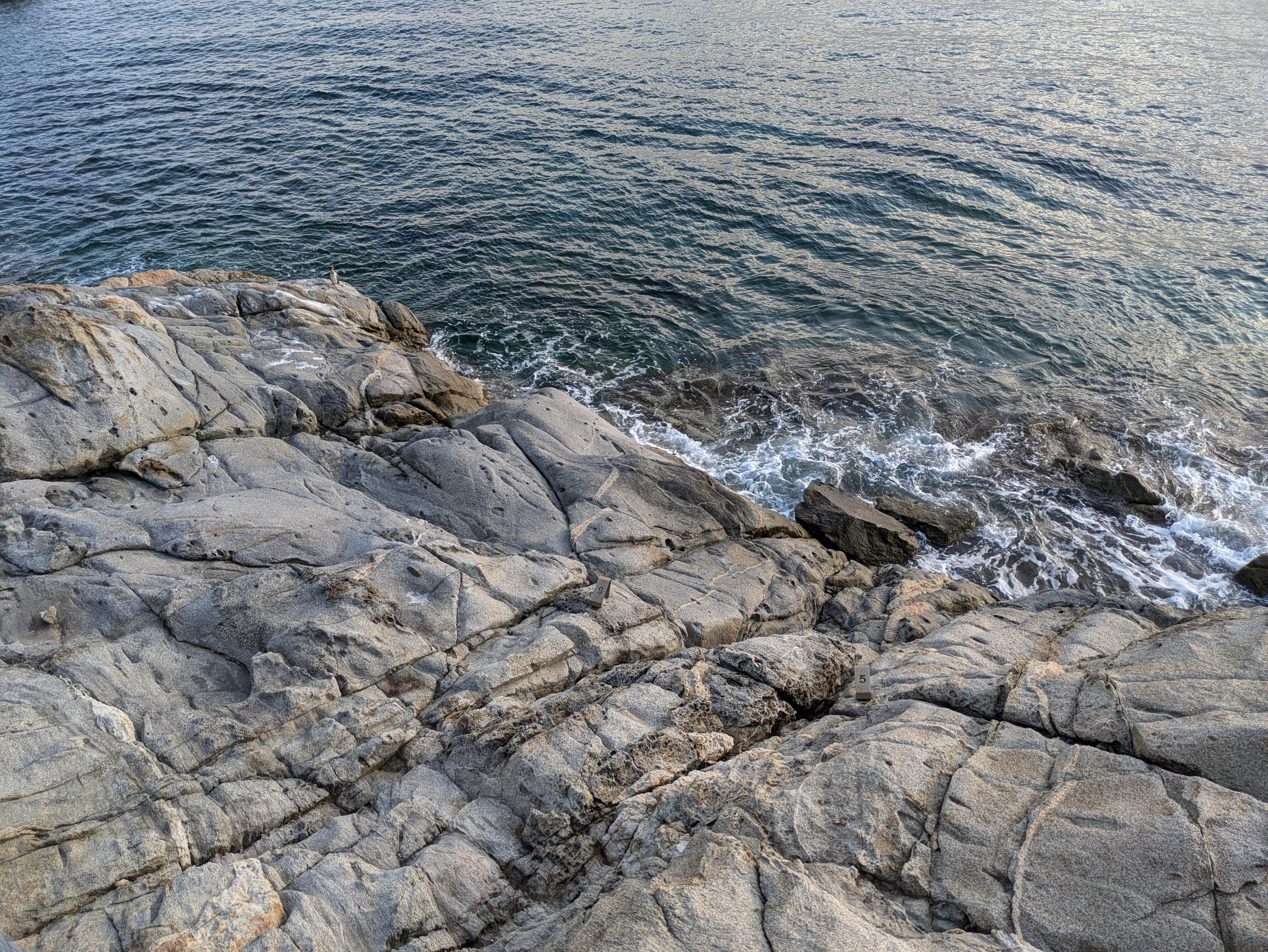
Granodiorite on the coast near Roses.

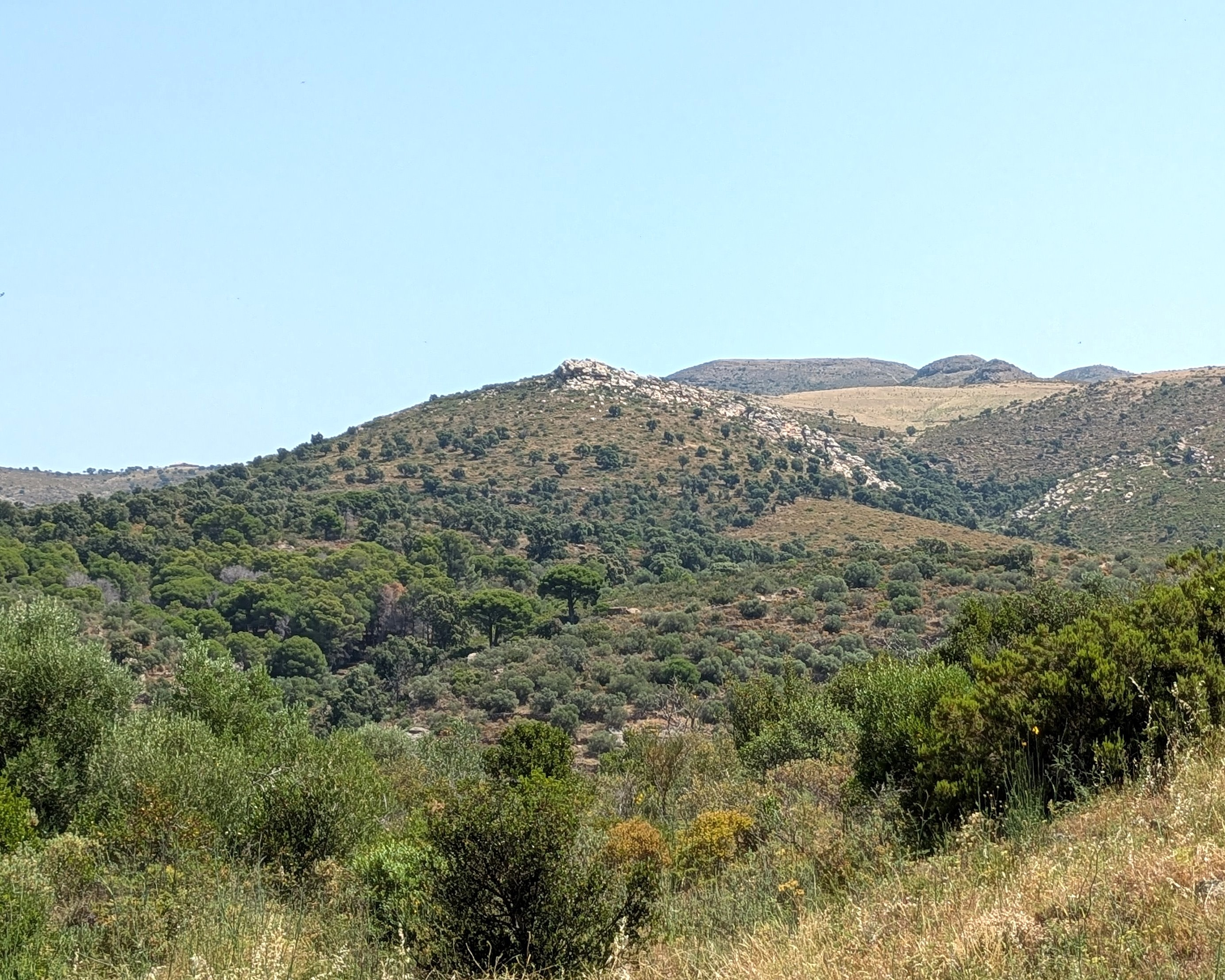
Puig d'en Marès - where a giant quartz vein cuts across the granodiorite.

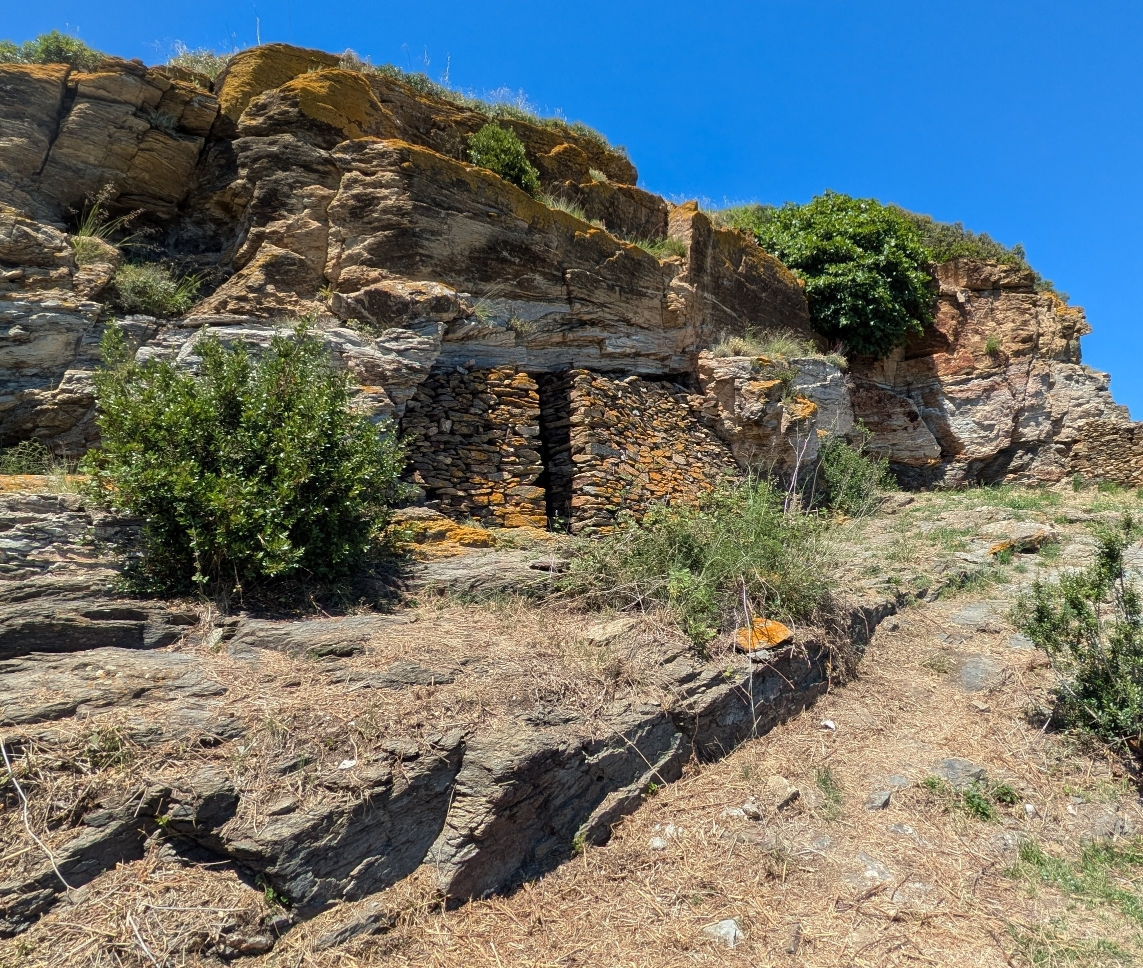
Cova de les Ermites (the hermits' cave), in Cambrian limestone, overlain by sandstone.

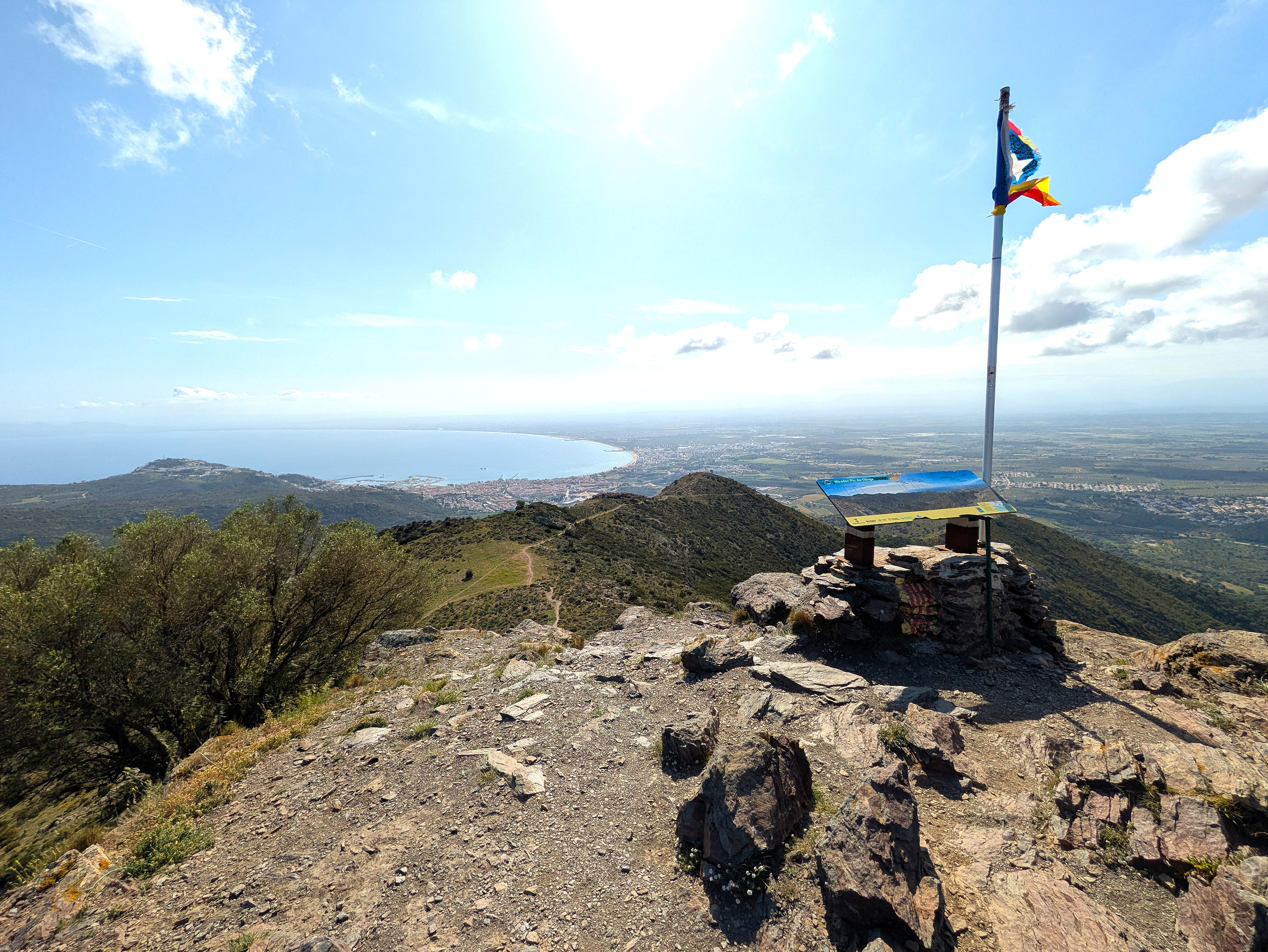
Puig de l'Àliga (the eagle's peak), on Ediacaran black schist. The low-lying area beyond is the Quaternary zone.

== History ==
=== Early history ===
Menhir del Mas Marès, close to the town of Roses. Discovered in 2005 and re-erected in 2006, this granite menhir is located in an area richly endowed with dolmens and other megalithic monuments.

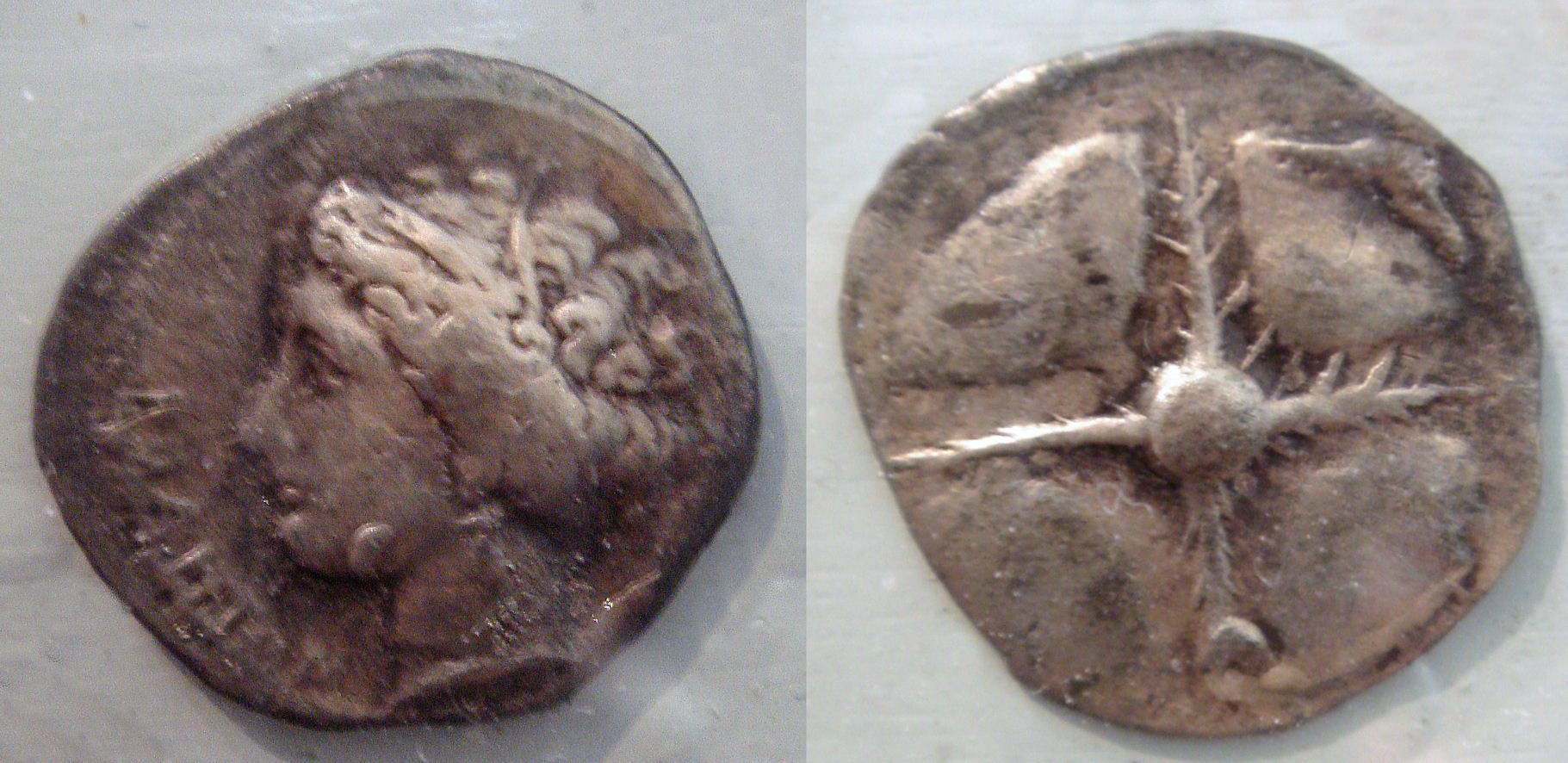
Rhoda coins, 5th-1st century BCE.

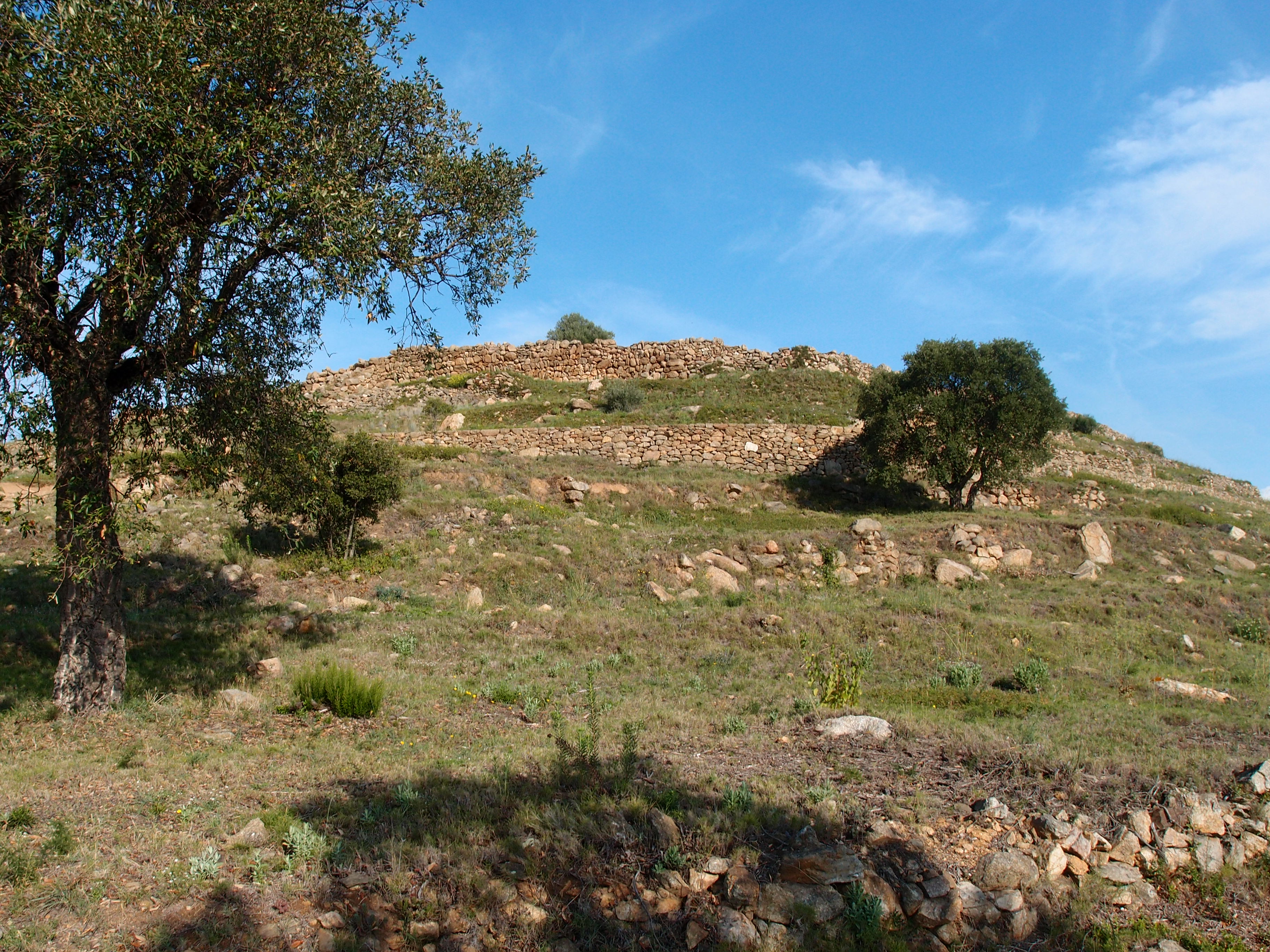
Visigothic settlement on Puig Rom.

The origins of Roses are disputed. According to classical sources, it was founded in the 8th century BC by Greek colonists from Rhodes and was called Rhode (Ancient Greek: Ῥόδη) and Rhodus (Ῥόδος) and Ῥοδίπολις/Ῥόδη πόλις.

It seems more probable that it was founded in the 5th century BC by Greeks from Massalia (Marseilles), perhaps with an admixture of colonists from neighbouring Emporion (today's Empúries). Remains of the Greek settlement can still be seen.

Remains from the Roman period go back to the 2nd century BC and continue well into Christian times with a paleochristian church and necropolis. After the collapse of Roman power the town seems to have been abandoned, but a fortified settlement from the Visigothic period has been excavated on the nearby Puig Rom.

The mediaeval town grew around the monastery of Santa Maria de Roses (mentioned since 944). Its jurisdiction was shared by the abbots of Santa Maria de Roses and the counts of Empúries. In 1402 the county of Empúries was incorporated into the Crown of Aragon and Roses acquired the right to organize its own municipal government and economy.

=== Fortification ===
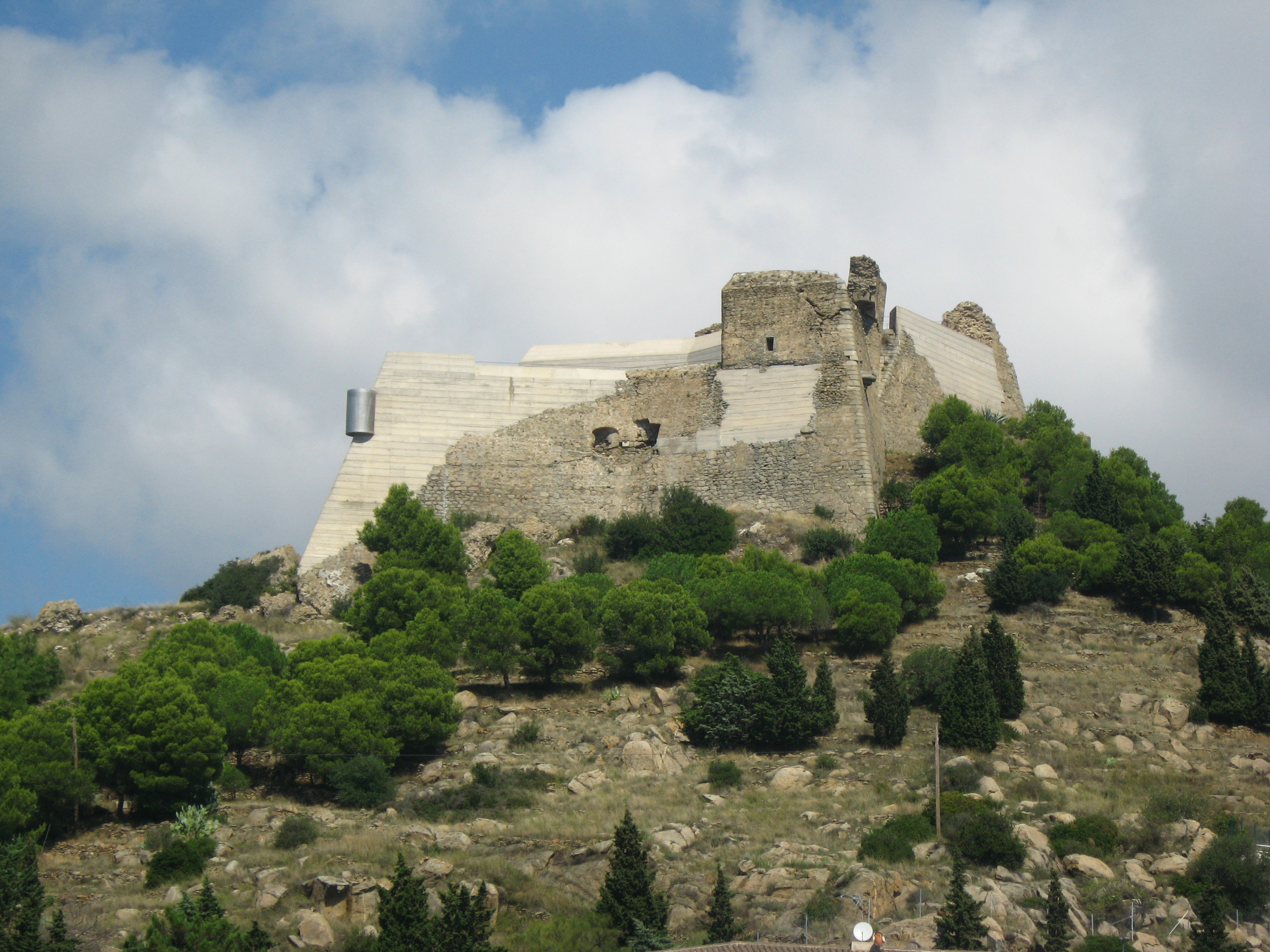
The Castell de la Trinitat

In the first decades of the 16th century, Roses suffered repeated attacks by privateers from North Africa. To counter the threat, Charles V ordered the construction of extensive fortifications, the Ciutadella, in 1543. In spite of the precautions, a naval squadron led by the Turkish admiral Barbarossa attacked and plundered the town some months later. After substantial revisions, the fortifications were completed in 1553, under Charles's son Philip II. The entire medieval town was enclosed by a bastioned pentagonal wall (illustration, below).

The defensive system was supplemented by the Castell de la Trinitat, some 2.5 km to the east. The town received a permanent military garrison, which profoundly changed its character. To minimise friction between the citizenry and the soldiers, barracks were constructed, but did not prevent the gradual movement of part of the population to outside the walls, where the modern town of Roses now is.

In the following centuries, the fortifications were severely tested. In 1645, during the Catalan Revolt, French troops besieged Roses and captured it. The Treaty of the Pyrenees (1659) restored the town to Spain.

In 1693, during the War of the Grand Alliance the French captured the town again. This time the French occupation lasted until the Peace of Ryswick in 1697. In 1712, during the War of the Spanish Succession, Austrian troops tried to take the city, but were driven off. In 1719, during the War of the Quadruple Alliance, the French again attacked, but failed to take Roses.

After a long period of relative calm, the Wars of the French Revolution ushered in a new round of hostilities. In 1793, the French revolutionary government declared war on Spain. At first, the Spanish armies won a foothold in France, but in 1794 the revolutionary armies invaded Catalonia. The Siege of Roses lasted from 28 November 1794 until 3 February 1795, when the garrison was safely evacuated by a Spanish naval squadron, except for 300 soldiers. The town was surrendered to France, but the war between France and Spain ended at the Peace of Basle signed in July 1795. The city quickly returned to Spanish control.

In 1808, Emperor Napoleon I of France forced King Charles IV of Spain and his son Ferdinand to abdicate and installed his brother, Joseph Bonaparte on the throne. When the Spanish people revolted against this high-handed behavior, French armies again invaded the country in the Peninsular War. The fourth and last Siege of Roses occurred in 1808. During the operation, the Scottish Royal Navy captain, Thomas Cochrane assisted the Spanish by putting his men into Castell de la Trinitat to help defend the town. The Scot stayed until the citadel and the town surrendered, before evacuating himself and his men. In 1814, when the defeated French withdrew from Spain, they blew up the town's fortifications along with the Castell de la Trinitat. At this time, the ancient town, called the Ciutadella, was completely ruined. Meanwhile, to the east the modern town slowly continued to grow.

=== Contemporary age ===
In 1879, Roses suffered a devastating economic crisis through phylloxera, a pest of the grapevines, that destroyed the town's wine growing industry. Some of the population moved to Barcelona or emigrated to the United States.

In the 20th century, notably in the period after World War II, Roses profited from the growth of tourism.

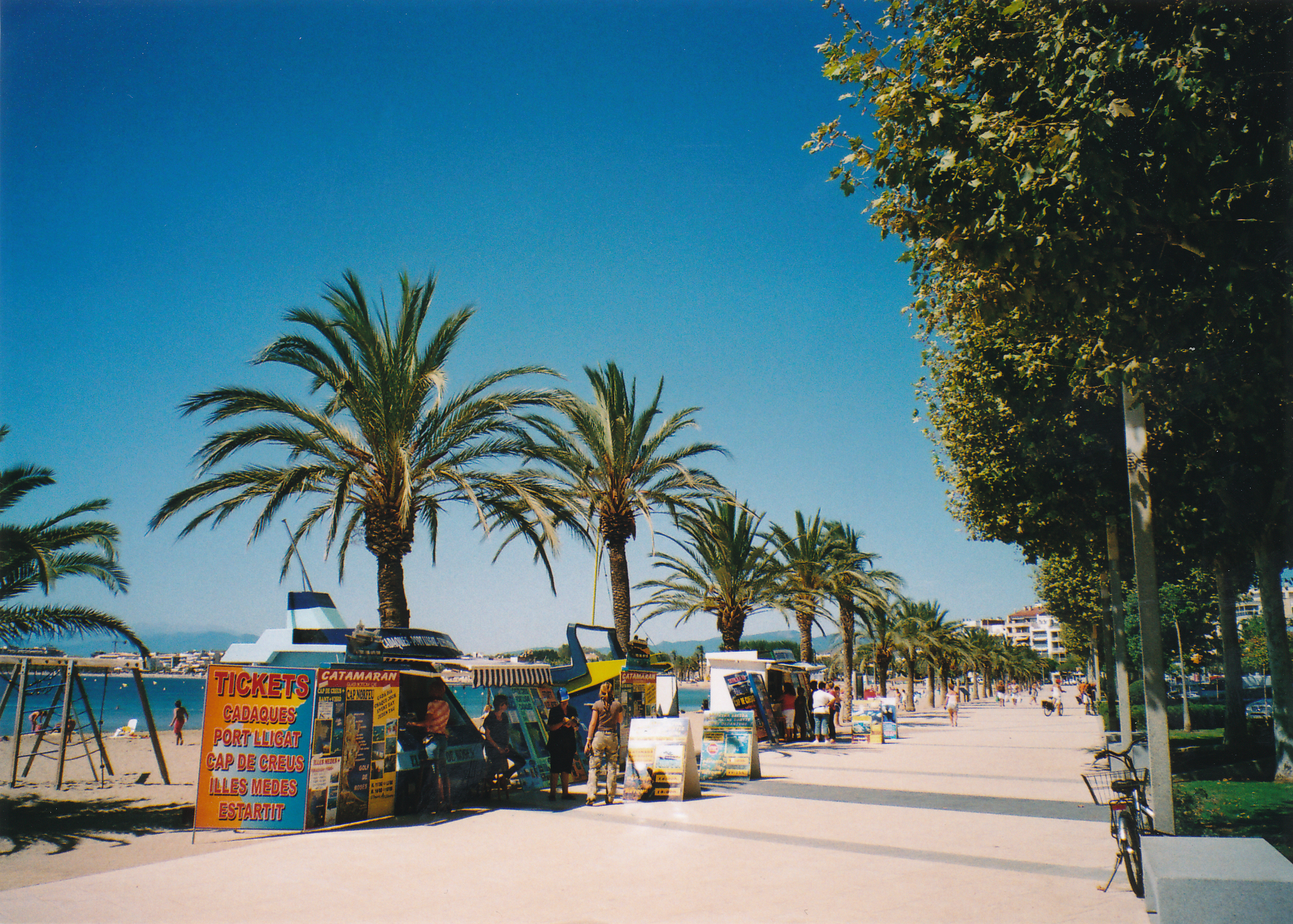
Palm-lined sea promenade.

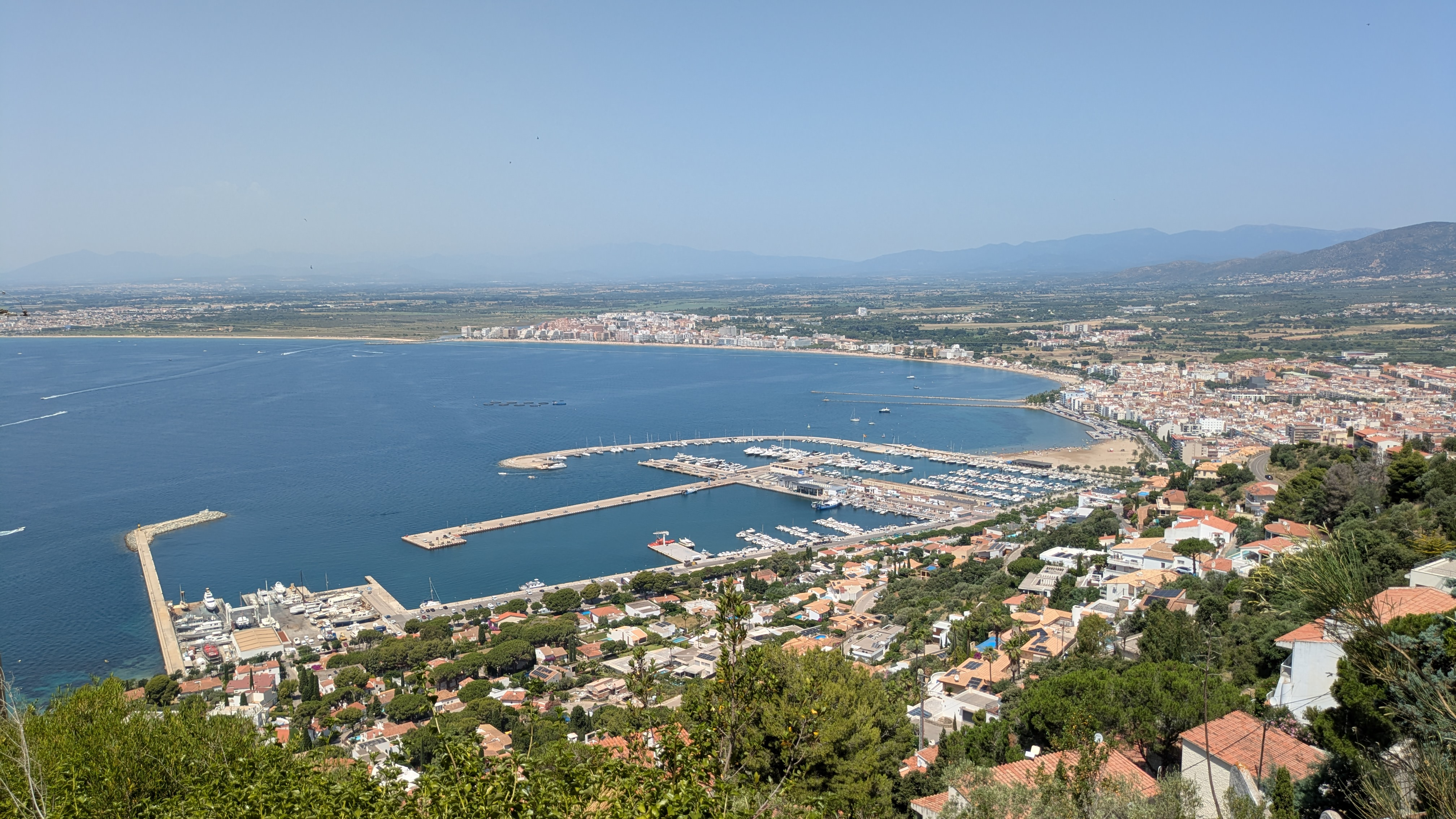
The port of Roses - both a fishing port and a marina, for recreational boating.

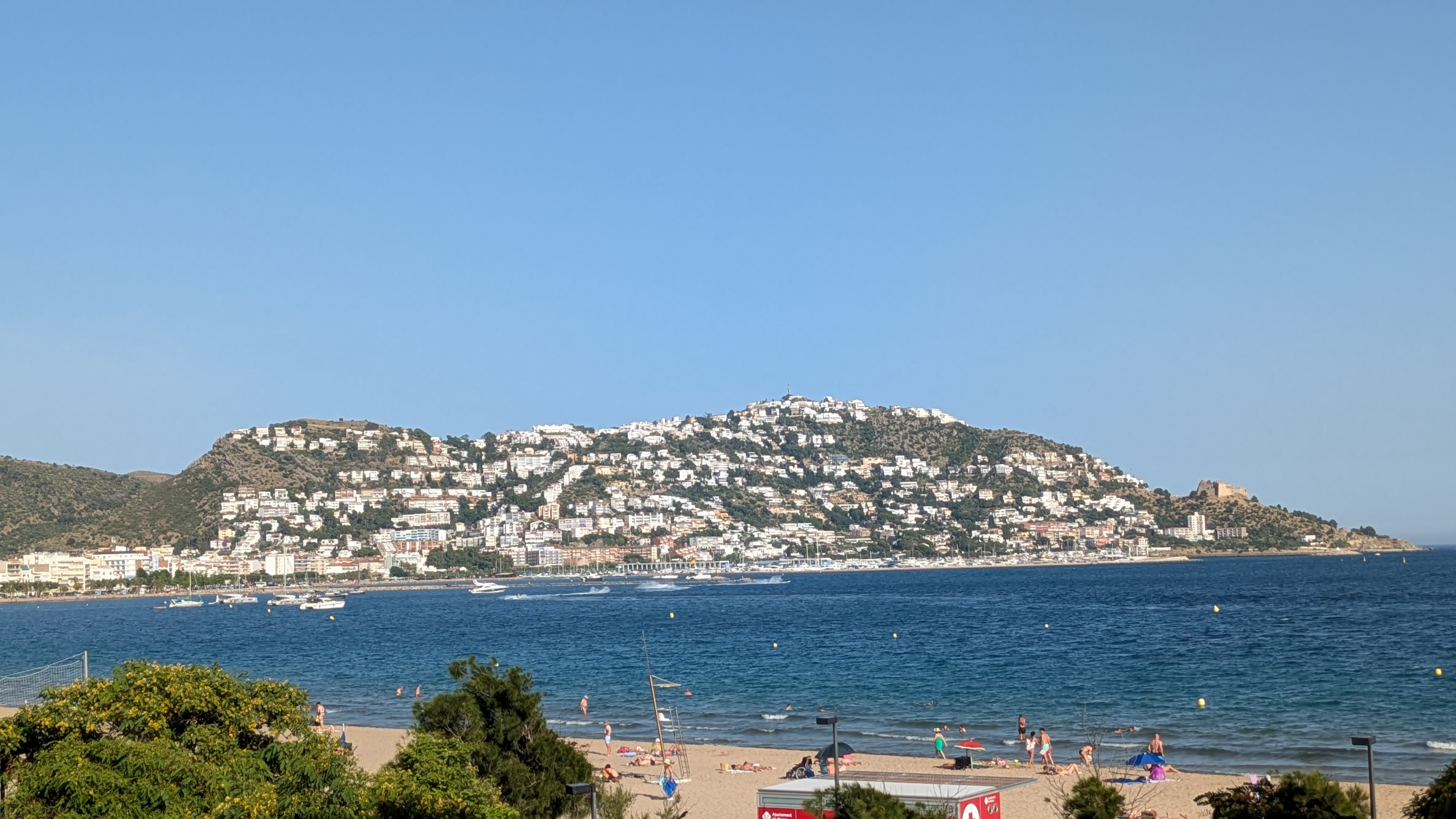
Puig Rom (altitude 225 metres), at the eastern end of Roses.

Over the last decades, important excavations have been carried out inside the walls of the Ciutadella concerning not only the Greek and Roman remains, but part of the medieval city and its walls. In the 1990s, extensive restoration work was carried out on the walls of the Ciutadella, and in 2004 a museum was opened inside it. A controversial restoration of the Castell de Trinitat was formally completed in 2010.

Roses was the home of El Bulli, one of the world's best and most famous restaurants, from 1961 until its closure in July 2011. El Bulli had held three Michelin stars since 1997 and was rated the world's best restaurant for four straight years 2006-2009 by Restaurant Magazine.

== Ecclesiastical history ==
The monastery of Santa Maria de Roses is mentioned in a document of the year 944. Around the monastery grew the mediaeval town of Roses, whose jurisdiction was shared by the abbots of Santa Maria de Roses and the counts of Empúries.

As Rotdon, it was a suffragan bishopric of the Metropolitan Roman Catholic Archdiocese of Tarragona, but faded.

=== Titular see ===
The diocese was nominally restored in 1969 as a Latin Catholic titular bishopric. The title has been held by:

- William Tibertus McCarty, C.SS.R. (1969.09.11 – 1971.01.13)
- Francis Lenny (1974.05.03 – 1978.07.16)
- Laurence Forristal (1979.12.03 – 1981.06.30)
- John Anthony Rawsthorne (1981.11.09 – 1997.06.04)
- Néstor Hugo Navarro (1998.04.15 – 2003.03.19)
- Enrique Benavent Vidal (2004.11.08 – 2013.05.17)
- Jesús Fernández González (2013.12.10 – 2020.06.08)
- Aurelio García Macías (2021.05.27 – present)

== Demographics ==
According to Idescat, Roses' population in 2016 was 19,438 people on a land area of 45.9 km, the density is 423.4 people per square kilometer, much higher than the average of the Comarca of Alt Empordà (103.2) and the overall of Catalonia (234.3).

- Population groups by Age (2015)

0 – 14 years old	3.339
15 – 64 years old	12.905
65 – 84 years old	2.955
85 years or older	376
Total	19.575

- Population groups by gender (2016)

Men	9.722
Women	9.716
Total	19.438

Roses increases its population in summer because of tourism and welcomes 120,000 visitors, the majority of them from Spain, France, Germany and Great Britain.
