= Novarro =

Novarro is a surname. Notable people with the surname include:

- David Novarro, television news journalist for WABC-TV in New York
- Eddy Novarro (1925–2003), photographer, a collector and a cosmopolitan
- Nate Novarro (born 1986), drummer for Cobra Starship
- Ramon Novarro (1899–1968), Mexican film, stage and television actor

== See also ==
- Novaro
- Navarro
