= David Navarro =

David Navarro may refer to:

- Dave Navarro (born 1967), American guitarist
- David Navarro (basketball) (born 1983), Spanish basketball player
- David Navarro (football manager) (born 1974), Spanish football manager
- David Navarro (footballer) (born 1980), Spanish footballer

== See also ==
- David Nabarro (born 1949), British medical doctor and diplomat
