= Novaro =

Novaro is a surname, and may refer to:

- Marco Novaro (1912–?), Italian sailor
- Maria Novaro (born 1951), Mexican film director
- Michele Novaro (1818–1885), Italian songwriter
- Octavio Novaro (1939–2018), Mexican theoretical physicist
- Tito Novaro (1918–1986), Mexican actor, director and screenwriter

== See also ==
- Novarro
- Navarro
