= Temple of Artemis Ephesia (Marseille) =

The Temple of Artemis Ephesia was a sanctuary in ancient Massalia, dedicated to Artemis.

The sanctuary is connected to the mythology around the founding of the city of Massalia by the Greeks in the 7th century BCE. It was a temple dedicated to the Ephesian version of Artemis, and the cult of her in Massalia was closely connected to the cult of her in Ephesus. It was one of the three most important shrines in Massalia, alongside the Temple of Apollon Delphinios and the Temple of Athena.

Strabo described the temple:

Massilia [in Gaul] was founded by the [Greek] Phokaians, and it is situated on a rocky place. Its harbour lies at the foot of a theatre-like rock which faces south . . . It is on the headland that the Ephesion [temple of Artemis Ephesia] and also a temple of Apollon Delphinios (of the Dolphins) are situated. The latter is shared in common by all Ionians, whereas the Ephesion is a temple dedicated solely to Artemis Ephesia (of Ephesos): for when the Phokaians were setting sail from their homeland an oracle was delivered to them, it is said, to use for their voyage a guide received from Artemis Ephesia; accordingly, some of them put in at Ephesos and inquired in what way they might procure from the goddess what had been enjoined upon them. Now the goddess, in a dream, it is said, had stood beside Aristarkha, one of the women held in very high honour, and commanded her to sail away with the Phokaians, taking with her a certain reproduction [of the main statue of Artemis Ephesia] which was among the sacred images; this done and the colony finally settled, they not only established the temple but also did Aristarkha the exceptional honour of appointing her priestess; further, in the colonial cities [of Massilia] the people everywhere do this goddess honours of the first rank, and they preserve the artistic design of the ‘xoanon’ [primitive wooden images which were supposed to have originally fallen from heaven] the same, and all the other usages precisely the same as is customary in the mother-city.

The Temple of Artemis Ephesia in Massalia was an important center of the Massaliotes and its colonies and the Greek population in Gaul. According to Strabo, a second temple was established near the Rhône (Rhodanos in Greek): "They [the Massiliotes] also established a temple of Artemis Ephesia there [i.e. at the mouth of the Rhodanos in southern Gaul], after first enclosing a piece of land which is made an island by the mouths of the river." The cult of The Ephesian Artemis also reportedly spread so far as to the Iberians: "They [the people of Massilia] founded in Iberia [towns] as strongholds against the Iberians, and they also taught the Iberians the sacred rites of Artemis Ephesia, as practiced in the fatherland, so that they sacrifice by the Greek ritual."

While an Ionic capital has been found, believed to belong to the sanctuary, the exact location of the temple has not yet been established. Limestone from the quarries, described by Strabo, at La Pointe de L'Arquet in La Couronne was used in the building.

== See also ==
- Ancient Greek temple
- List of Ancient Greek temples
