= Diana of Gabii =

Statue at the Louvre in Paris

- Artemis of Gabii
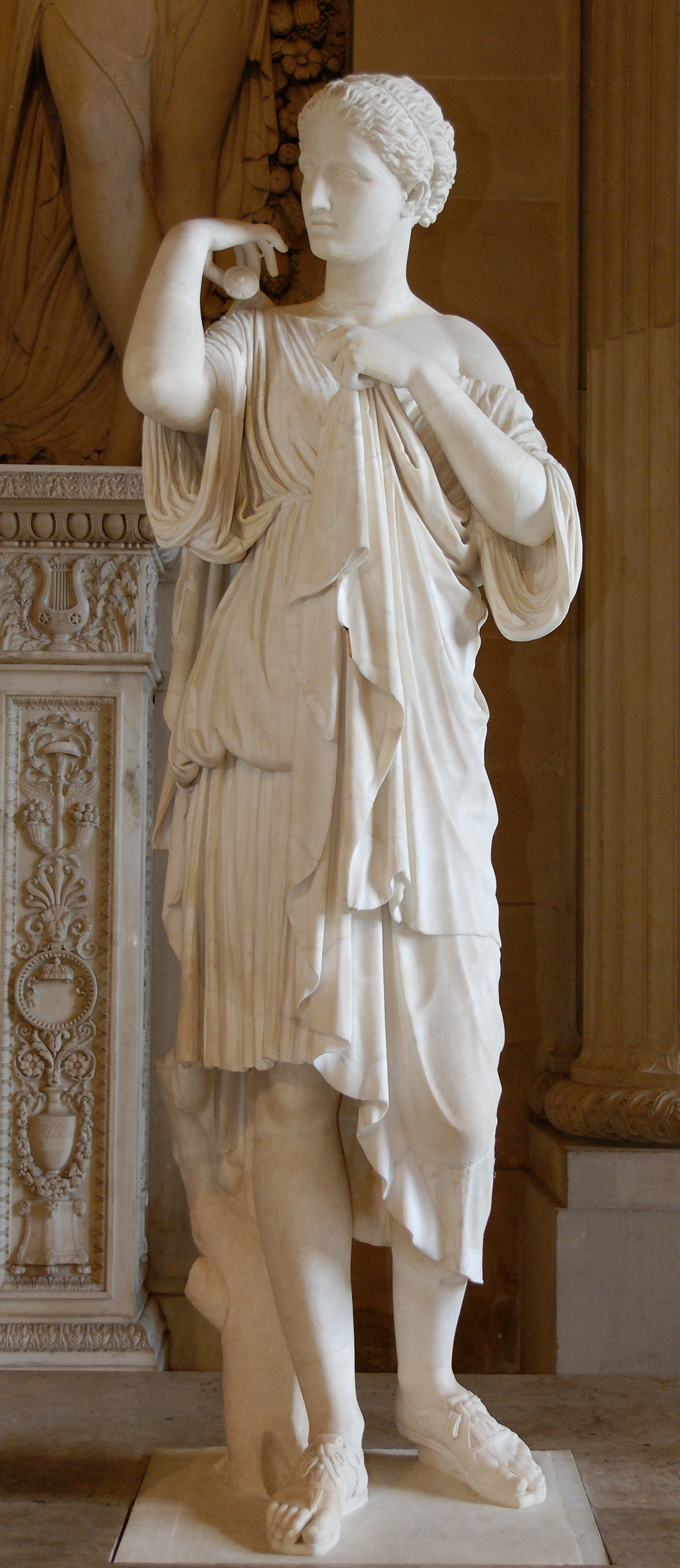
- Catalogue: Ma 529
- Type: sculpture
- Medium: marble
- Dimensions: 165 cm (65 in)
- Location: Louvre; Paris
- Accession: 1807

The Diana of Gabii is a statue of a woman in drapery which probably represents the goddess Artemis and is traditionally attributed to the sculptor Praxiteles. It became part of the Borghese collection and is now conserved in the Louvre with the inventory number Ma 529.

== History ==
The statue was discovered in 1792 by Gavin Hamilton on the property of the Prince Borghese at Gabii, not far from Rome It was immediately added to the prince's collections. In 1807, suffering from financial difficulties, the Prince was forced to sell the statue to Napoleon and it was on display in the Louvre from 1820.

The statue became very popular in the 19th century; a plaster cast was placed in the Athenaeum Club, London, a marble copy was among the copies of ancient statues produced to decorate the Louvre's central court, and a cast iron replica decorated a fountain in the village of Grancey-le-Château-Neuvelle in the Côte-d'Or. In addition, replicas of reduced size in terracotta or porcelain were manufactured and sold for art enthusiasts.

== Description ==
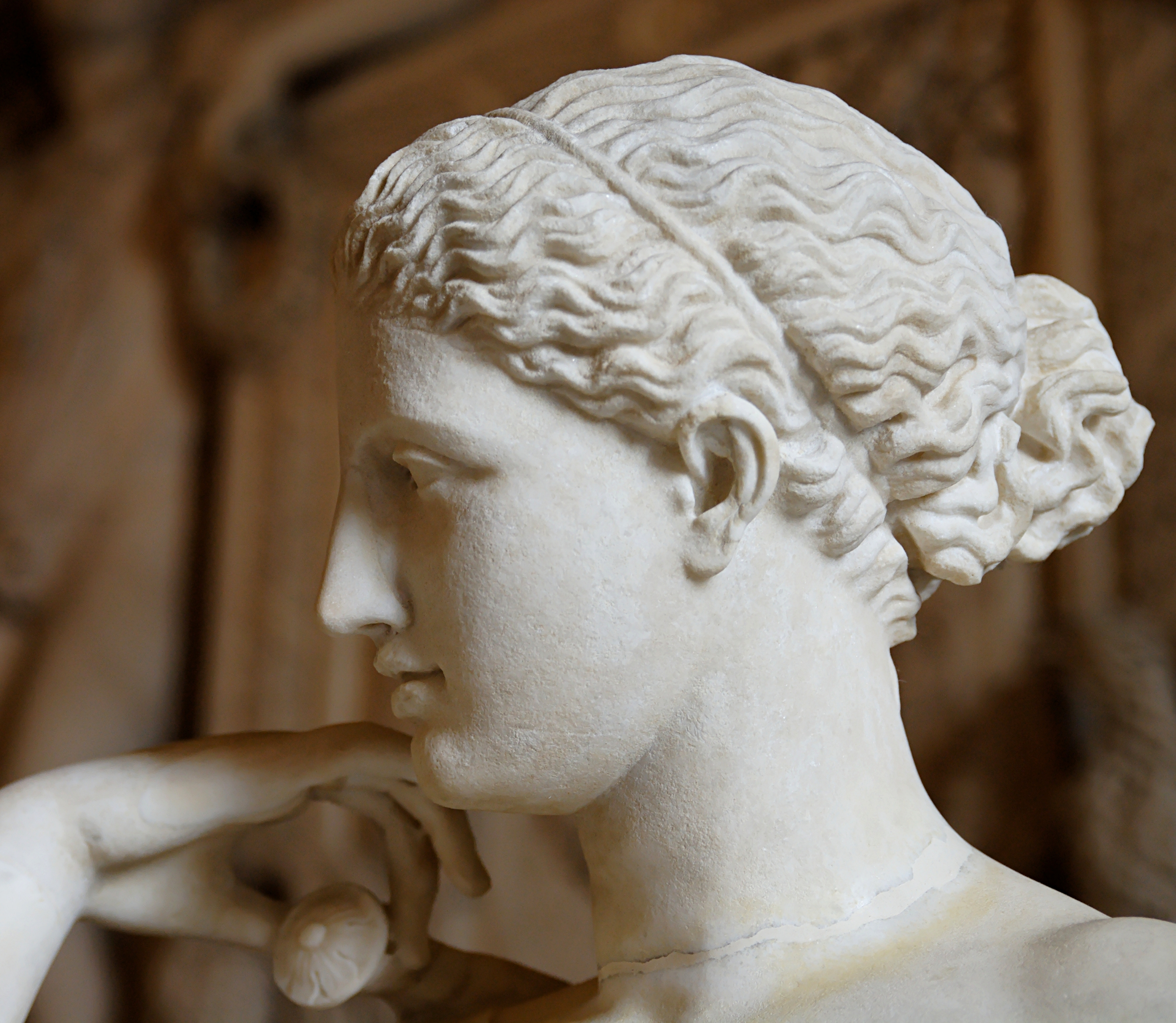
The face

The statue represents a young woman of more than life size, standing in drapery. The weight of the body rests on the right leg, supported by a tree stump; the left leg is left free. The left foot is thrown back and the heel slightly raised with the toes turned outward.

The statue is generally identified as Artemis, virgin goddess of hunting and the wild, solely on account of her clothing. She wears what is effectively a short chiton with large sleeves, typical of the goddess. The chiton is bound by two belts: one is visible around her waist, the other is hidden, allowing a portion of the fabric to be gathered, shortening the chiton and exposing the knees. The goddess is represented in the process of pinning her cloak on: her right hand holds a fibula and lifts a fold of her clothing on her right shoulder while her left hand lifts another fold of cloth up to chest level. The movement causes the collar of the chiton to fall, leaving the left shoulder exposed.

The head is turned slightly to the right, but the goddess is not really focussed on what she is doing. Instead she looks out into space, as is common for statues of the Second classicism. Her flowing hair is pulled back by a band tied above her neck. This hair is gathered in a bun held by a second ribbon which is not visible.

== Attribution ==
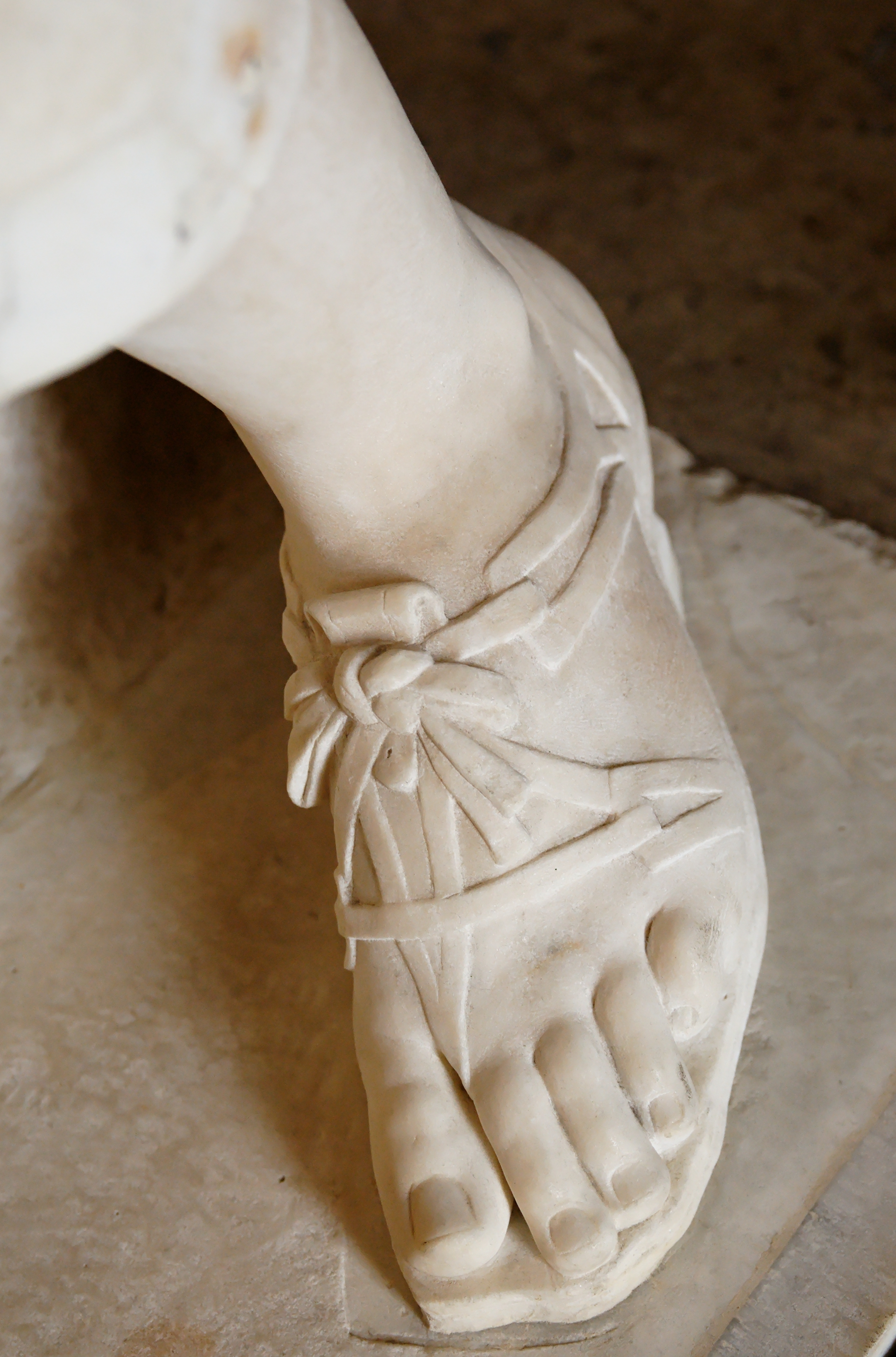
Design of the sandal of the left foot

According to Pausanias, Praxiteles created the statue of Artemis of Brauron for the Athenian Acropolis. Temple inventories dating from 347/6 BC mention among other things, a "dedicated statue," described as representing the goddess in a chitoniskos. It is also known that the cult practiced for Artemis Brauronia included the consecration of garments offered by girls.

Praxiteles' statue has long been connected with the Diana of Gabii: the goddess apparently in the act of putting on the gift of her followers. Furthermore the head resembles that of the Aphrodite of Cnidus and the Apollo Sauroctonos which are also attributed to Praxiteles. However, the identification has been questioned on several grounds. Firstly, the inventories discovered at Athens have been proven to be copies of those from the sanctuary at Brauron – it is not certain the cult in Athens also involved the dedication of cloaks. In addition, the short chiton is anachronistic for the fourth century BC and instead suggests a Hellenistic date. Finally, a more recent hypothesis connects Praxiteles' statue of Artemis Brauronia with a head in the Museum of the Ancient Agora, known as the Despinis Head.

Nevertheless, the Diana of Gabii is of strikingly high quality, and conforms closely to what is commonly considered to be the Praxitelian style, leading some scholars to maintain that the statue is a work of Praxiteles or one of his sons.

== Bibliography ==
- Aileen Ajootian, « Praxiteles », Personal Styles in Greek Sculpture (edited by Olga Palagia & Jerome J. Pollitt), Cambridge University Press, 1998 (1st edition 1996) (ISBN 0-521-65738-5), pp. 124–126.
- Francis Haskell & Nicholas Penny, "Taste and the Antique. The Lure of Classical Sculpture, 1500–1900," Bibliothèque d'archéologie, 1981 (ISBN 2-01-011642-9), no 101, pp. 218–219.
- Jean-Luc Martinez, « Praxitèle après Praxitèle », in Praxitèle, catalogue of the Louvre exhibition, 23 March-18 June 2007, éditions du Louvre & Somogy, 2007 (ISBN 978-2-35031-111-1), no. 73, pp. 312–314.
- Brunilde Sismondo Ridgway, Fourth-Century Styles in Greek Sculpture, Madison, University of Wisconsin Press, 1997 (ISBN 0-299-15470-X), p. 329.
- Claude Rolley, La Sculpture grecque, vol. II : La période classique, Manuels d'art et d'archéologie antiques, Picard, 1999 (ISBN 2-7084-0506-3), p. 262.
