= Despinis Head =

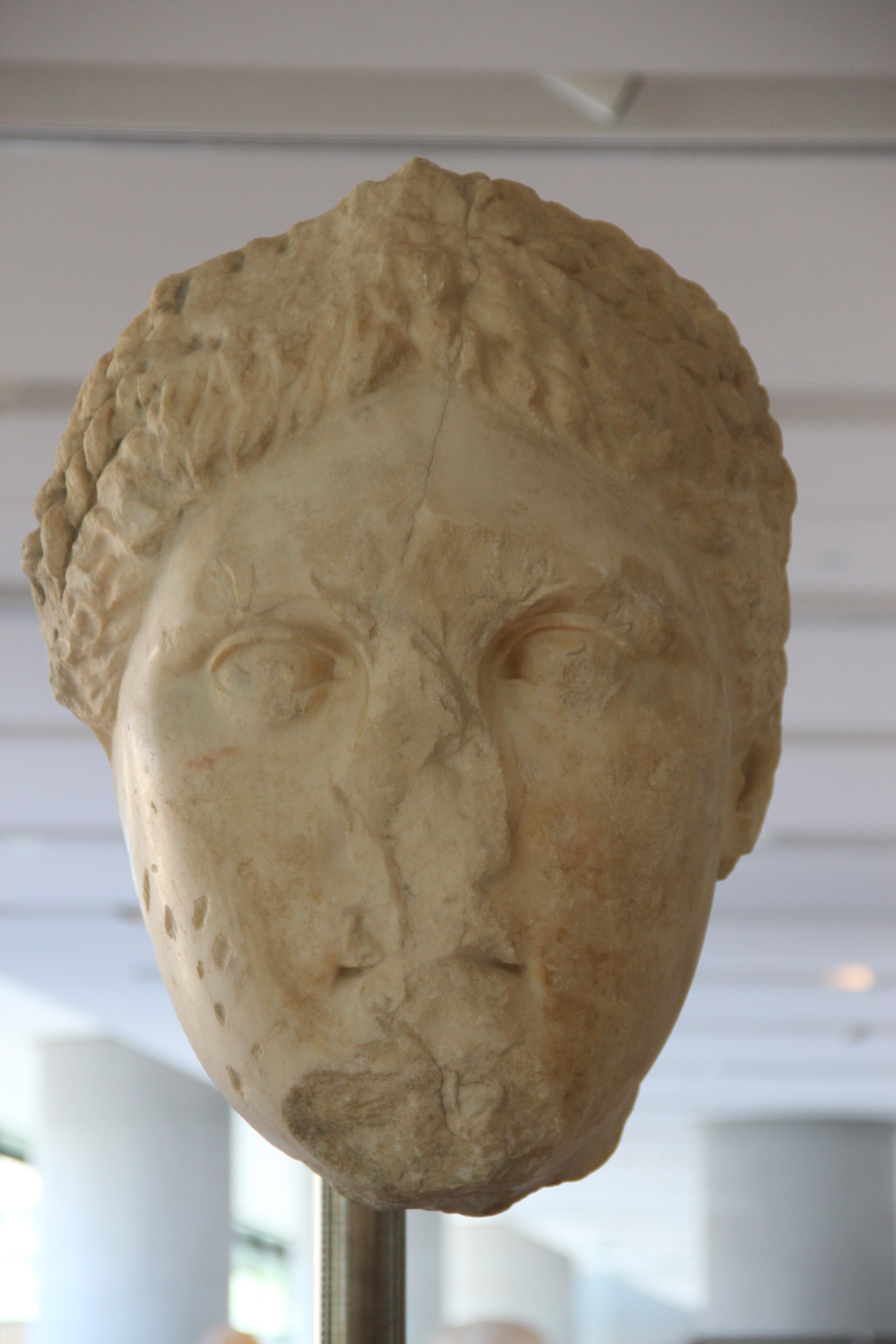
The Despinis Head, circa 330 BC, Parian marble, 56 cm. Acropolis Museum.

The Despinis Head is part of a colossal ancient Greek sculpture, depicting a female head, which was conserved in the store rooms of the Archaeological Museum of the Ancient Agora in Athens until recently. According to George Despinis, director of the museum, it was originally part of the statue of Artemis Brauronia carved by Praxiteles.

== Discovery ==
Conserved in the storerooms of the Museum of the Athenian agora under the inventory number 1352, the Despinis Head was originally published as a male head with an erroneous provenance. It was claimed that the head derived from the Makriyannis area just below the Acropolis. Using the original records mentioning it and a photograph, George Despinis established that is actually derived from the sanctuary of Athena Hygieia between the Brauroneion and the Propylaea. It was probably discovered in the course of Kyriakos S. Pittakis' excavations of 1839. The remnants of an earring prove that the head is female.

== Description ==
The head, carved in Parian marble, measures 56 cm high (i.e. twice life size) and the complete statue would have had a height of around 3.6 metres, which suggests that it was a cult statue. It has been damaged by the passage of time, but also by iconoclastic Christians who destroyed the left side of her hairdo, her nose, mouth, have been broken off and her eyes have been smashed.

The face of the goddess is rounded and slightly asymmetrical, with a rather severe expression. Her hairdo, which is parted in the middle of her forehead, is made up of two thick plaits wrapped around the head and a small vertical plait running from the front of her head to the top. This hairdo is most common in depictions of children and young women, such as a statue of Artemis found at Delos, and therefore fits a depiction of the young, virgin goddess Artemis.

== Attribution ==
In his description of Attica, Pausanias mentions the sanctuary of Artemis Brauronia and says "the cult statue is the work of Praxiteles. Traditionally the Diana of Gabii or the Artemis of Dresden have been considered to be imitations of this work.

George Despinis instead proposed that this head was Praxiteles' statue, since it was discovered around the location visited by Pausanias. He compared it with the Dancers of Delphi and the Themis of Rhamnous, two works which are dated to 330-320 BC and 320-280 BC respectively and belong to the final phase of Praxiteles' career.

It has been argued that the arrangement of the Brauronion, partially reconstructed from the archaeological remains, did not support the existence of a cult statue. However, the main objection to the attribution of the Despinis Head as Praxiteles' Artemis is stylistic: the solemn expression of the Despinis Head has little of the charm and grace considered to be characteristic of Praxiteles' style. However this characterisation of Praxiteles is largely derived from the Hermes and the Infant Dionysus whose attribution to Praxiteles is itself highly controversial. Moreover, the heavily damaged state of the head must be kept in mind, as well as the fact that it is difficult to imagine the impression that it would have had on a viewer in its original location, three metres above ground level.

== Bibliography ==
- (in German) George Despinis, « Neues zu einem alten Fund », Mitteilungen des Deutschen Archäologischen Instituts, Athenische Abteilung, 109 (1994), p. 173-198.
- (in French) Alain Pasquier, « Praxitèle aujourd'hui ? La question des originaux » in Praxitèle, catalogue of the Louvre museum exhibition, 23 March-18 June 2007, éditions du Louvre & Somogy, 2007 (ISBN 978-2-35031-111-1), p. 103-104 et cat. 24, p. 126-127.
- (in French) Claude Rolley, La Sculpture grecque, vol. II : La période classique, Manuels d'art et d'archéologie antiques, Picard, 1999 (ISBN 2-7084-0506-3), p. 262.
