= Vix Grave =

Celtic burial mound in Côte-d'Or, France

Coordinates: 47°54′23″N 04°31′58″E

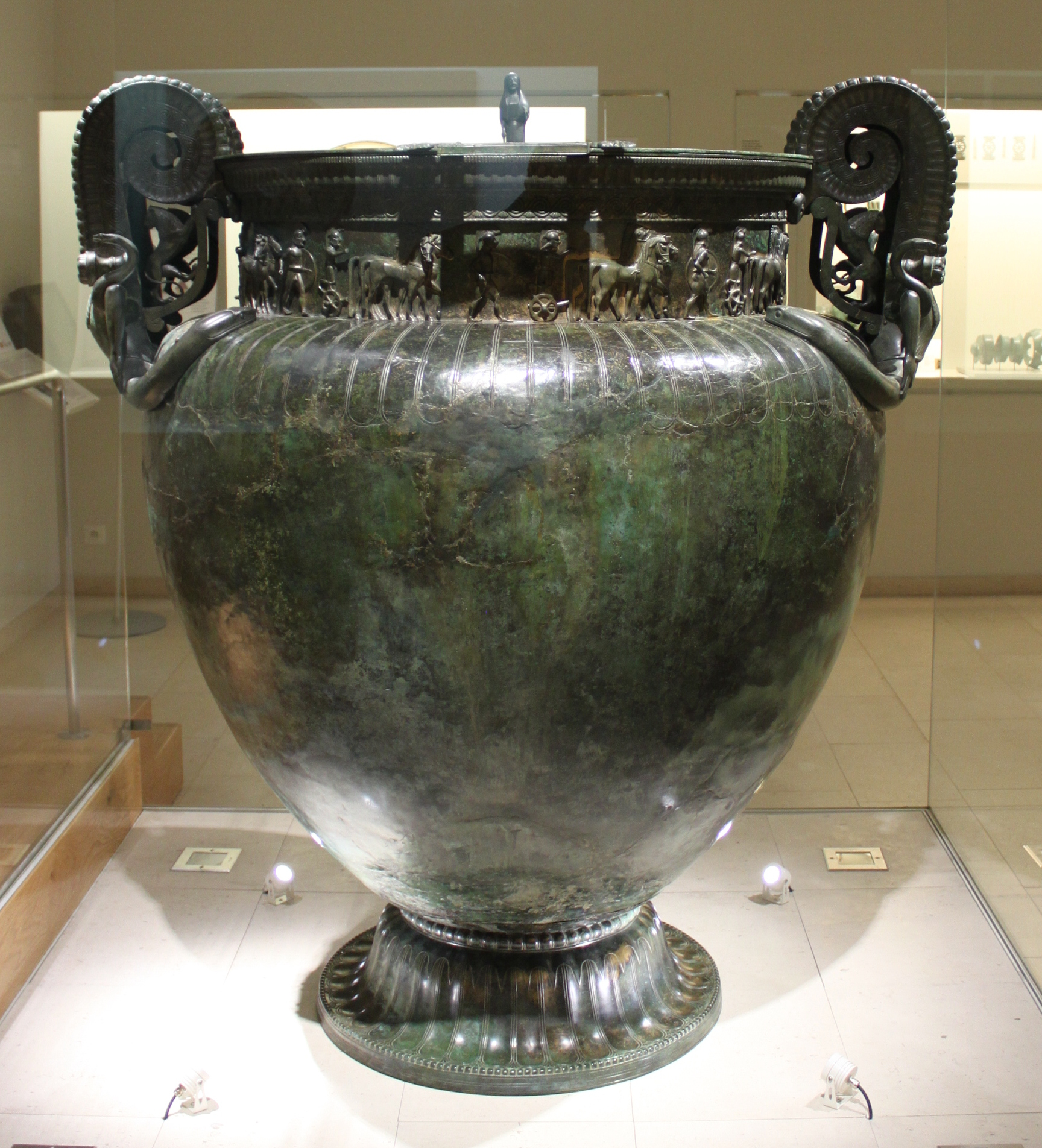
The Vix Krater, an imported Greek wine-mixing vessel found in the famous grave of the "Lady of Vix"

The Vix Grave is a burial mound near the village of Vix in northern Burgundy. The broader site is a prehistoric Celtic complex from the Late Hallstatt and Early La Tène periods, consisting of a fortified settlement and several burial mounds.

The grave of the Lady of Vix, dating to c. 470 BC, had never been disturbed and thus contained remarkably rich grave offerings. Known in French as the Trésor de Vix, these included a great deal of jewelry and the bronze "Vix krater", the largest known metal vessel from Western classical antiquity.

== Location ==
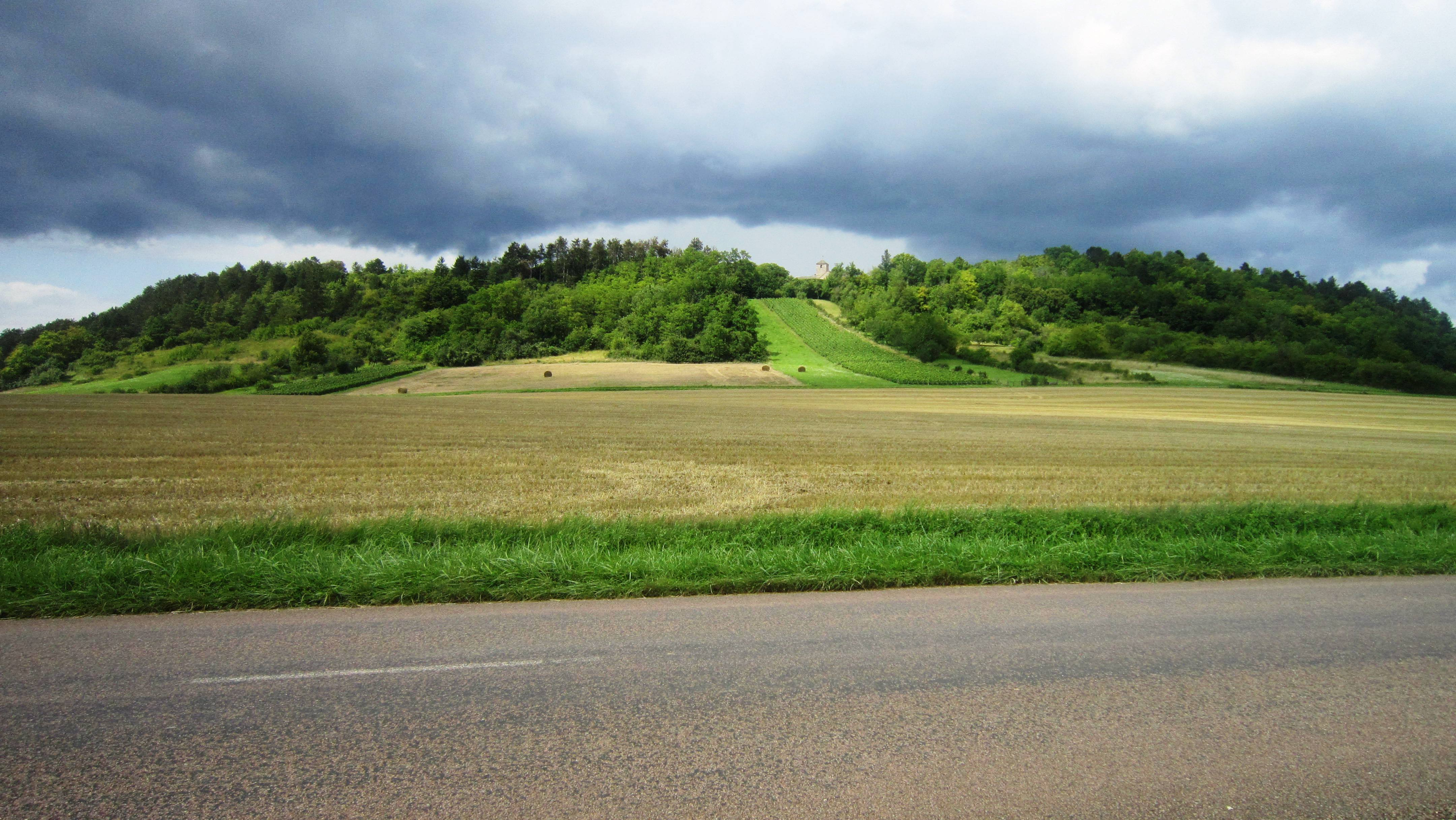
Mont Lassois.

The sites are located near the village of Vix, about 6 km north of Châtillon-sur-Seine, in the department of Côte-d'Or, in northeastern Burgundy. The complex is centred on Mont Lassois, a steep, flat-topped hill that dominates the area. It was the site of a fortified Celtic settlement, or oppidum. To the southeast of the hill, there was a 42-hectare necropolis with graves ranging from the Late Bronze Age via the Hallstatt Culture to Late La Tène. Other finds indicate activity up to Late Antiquity.

During the sixth and fifth centuries BC, the Vix (or Mont Lassois) settlement appears to have controlled a major trading node, where the Seine, an important riverine transport route linking eastern and western France, crossed the land route leading from the Mediterranean to northern Europe. Additionally, Vix is at the centre of an agriculturally rich plain.

== History of discovery ==
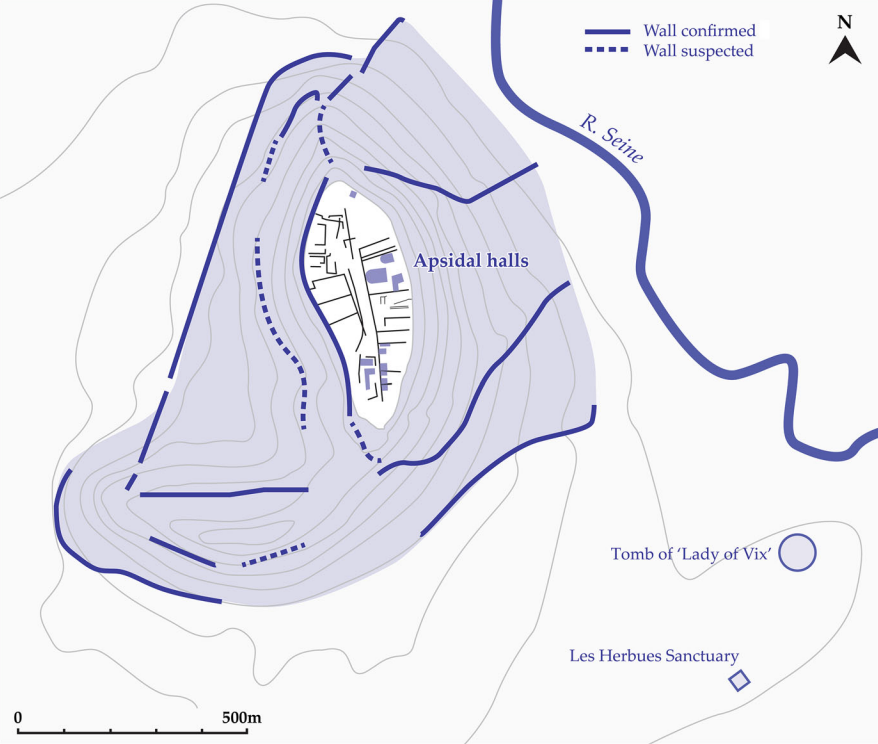
Plan of the Mont Lassois oppidum

Discovery of archaeological material in the area, originally by a locally based amateur named Jean Lagorgette, began in April 1930. Increasingly systematic work throughout the following decades revealed thousands of pottery sherds, fibulae, jewellery, and other bronze and iron finds. The burial mound with the krater was discovered by Maurice Moisson and excavated in early 1953 by him and René Joffroy. In 1991 new archaeological research on and around Mont Lassois began under the direction of Bruno Chaume. Since 2001 a programme of research titled "Vix et son environnement" began, uniting the resources of several universities.

It was in this context that new excavations were authorized, beginning on August 20, 2019, and conducted by the french National Institute for Preventive Archaeological Research (INRAP). The primary objective of this project was to “contextualize” the tomb discovered 66 years earlier. Although the 1953 excavations uncovered exceptional artifacts, several questions remain unanswered: does the funerary monument still contain secondary burials? And might it be possible to detect traces of a podium dedicated to the princess’s funeral ceremony, or even the original burial mound of a distant ancestor? Justifying this new excavation, Dominique Garcia, president of INRAP, notes that “it’s a bit as if we had opened a book, kept the pictures, and not read the text that accompanied them”.

== The oppidum of Mont Lassois ==
=== Fortifications and architecture ===
Excavation of the settlement on the summit of Mont Lassois revealed extensive fortifications, with ditches and walls up to 8 m thick. The walls were built in the Pfostenschlitzmauer technique, but also yielded nails of the type common in murus gallicus walls. Excavation inside the enclosure revealed a variety of buildings, including post houses, pit dwellings, hearths, and storage units built on stilts. Geophysical work shows a large planned settlement, with a central, north–south axis and several phases of buildings.

=== The "Palace of the Lady of Vix" ===
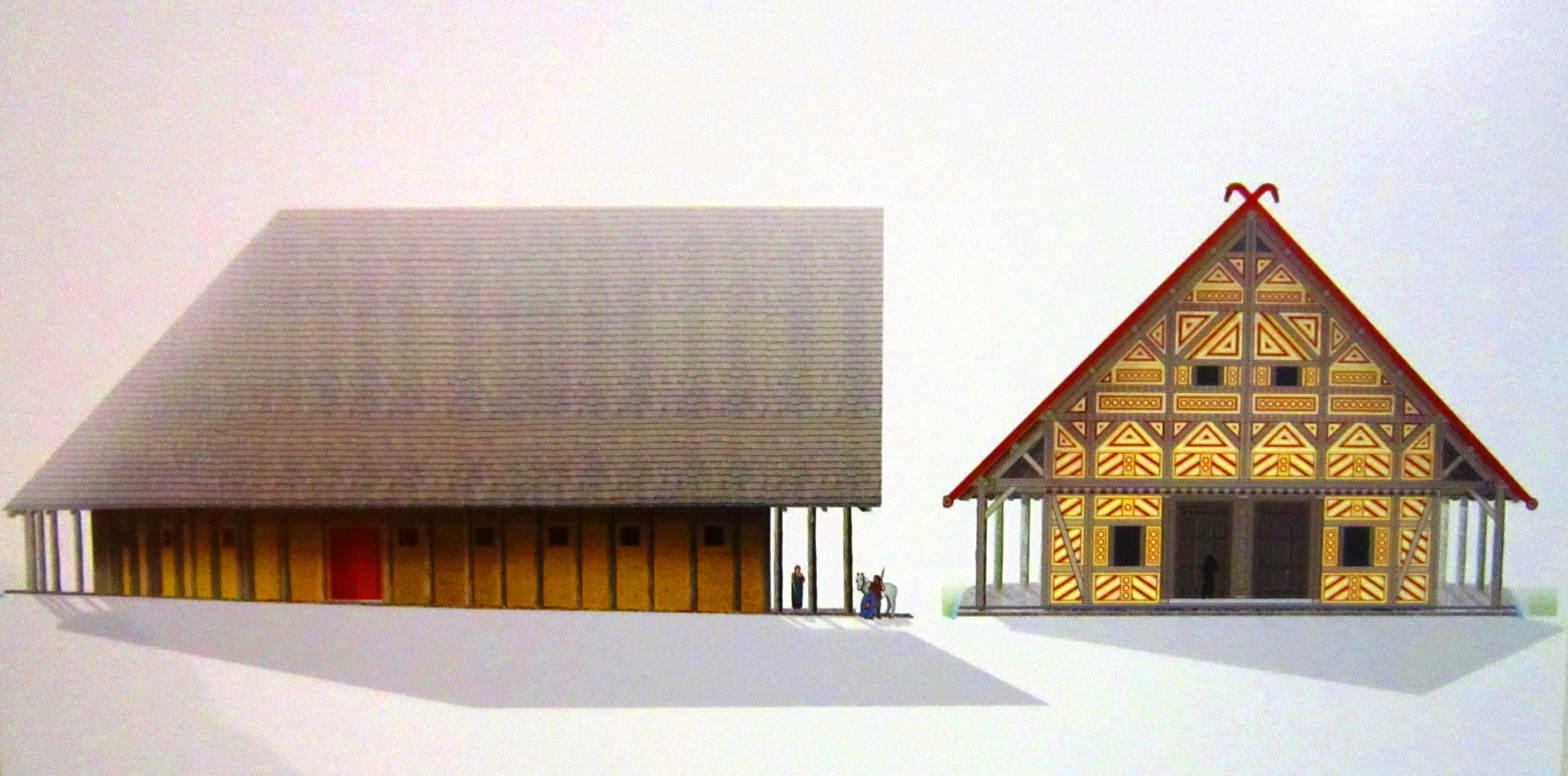
Part of the Vix palace, late 6th century BC

In 2006, a large complex with five large buildings was discovered at the centre of the site. The main building measured 35 by 22 m, with an estimated interior height of at least 15 m. The large hall had an apse at the back and a front porch in antis. Overall, the central unit resembles the megaron complex of early Greek architecture. Such a find is unprecedented in early Celtic Europe. Finds suggested domestic use or feasting uses. The structure has been described as the "Palace" of the Lady of Vix (Palais de la Dame de Vix). According to Chaume (2011): "The interior space of about 500 m^{2} is divided into three rooms of unequal size. This achievement demonstrates a mastery of geometry and carpentry capable of freeing up vast interior spaces". Geomagnetic surveying has revealed another large apsidal building in a large walled area at the foot of Mont Lassois, on the other side of the river Seine. The building is of similar size and design to those on the Mont Lassois plateau and has also been described as a 'palatial' building. All six large buildings have an identical east-west orientation with their main entrances facing towards the sunrise in the east. This configuration may have been chosen for symbolic rather than practical reasons. Various authors have suggested that the Lady of Vix may have been a priestess as well as a 'queen'.

=== Finds ===
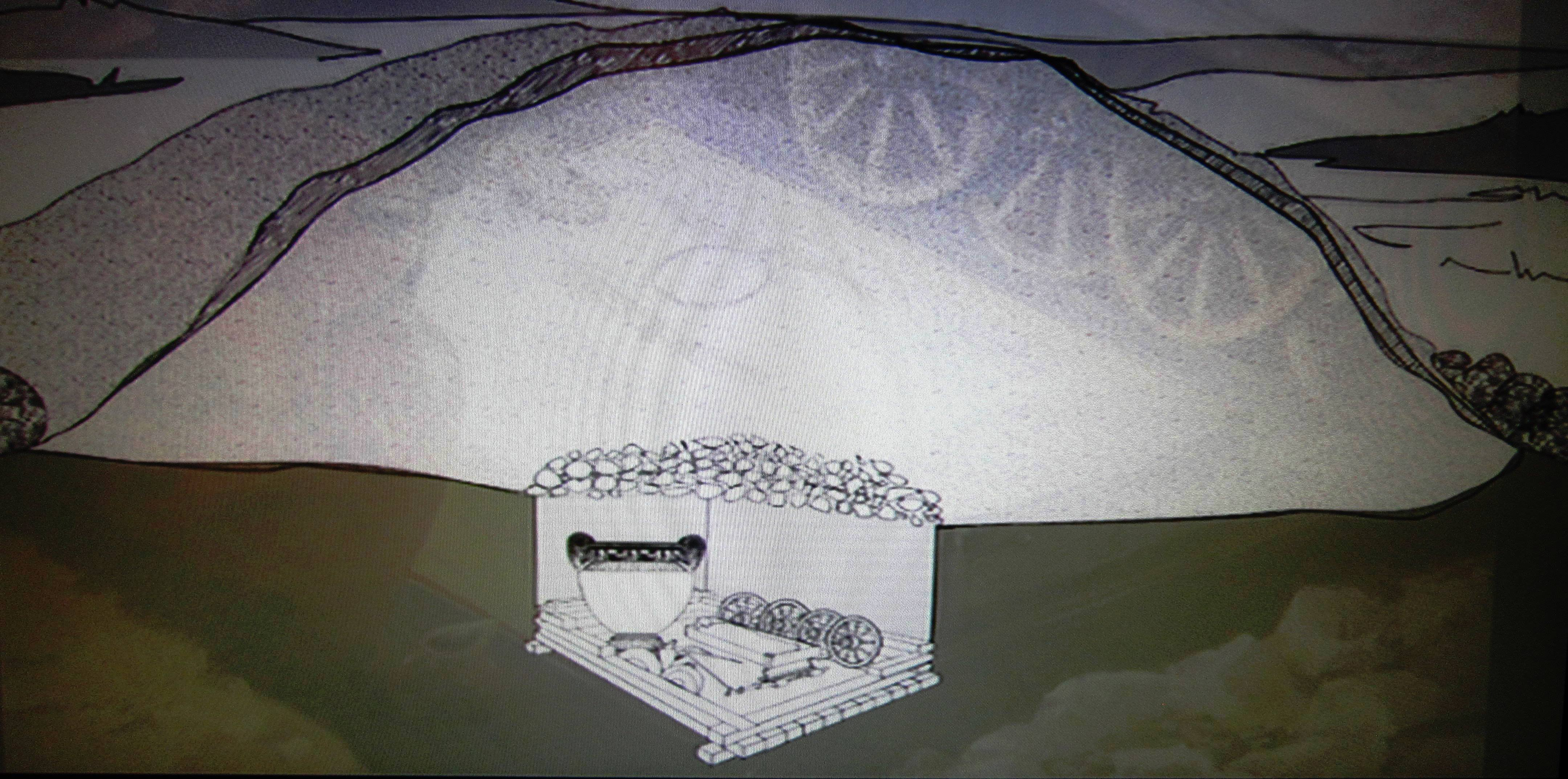
Tumulus and burial chamber.

The many individual finds from the Lassois oppidum clearly demonstrate the settlement's long and wide-ranging trade contacts, as well as its own role as an economic centre. The most common finds are shards of pottery, with more than 40,000 recorded to date. Many are local products, decorated with simple geometric motifs (checkerboard patterns) and occasional depictions of animals. There also have been finds of imported Attic black figure vases from Greece. Many amphorae and bowls could be identified as coming from the contemporary Greek-settled areas of southern France. The amphorae had been used for transporting wine.

Jewellery included fibulae, commonly decorated with amber or coral, earrings, beads, slate bracelets, and rings. Glass ornaments were also found. Some small bronze figurines found are probably of Mediterranean origin. Little weaponry has been found as yet, the majority of it projectiles and axes.

=== Status ===
Mont Lassois has all the features of a high-status settlement: large fortifications, the presence of a citadel and a lower town, rare and fine imported materials, as well as numerous rich burial mounds in the vicinity.

== The burial mounds ==
=== The 1953 Vix Grave ===
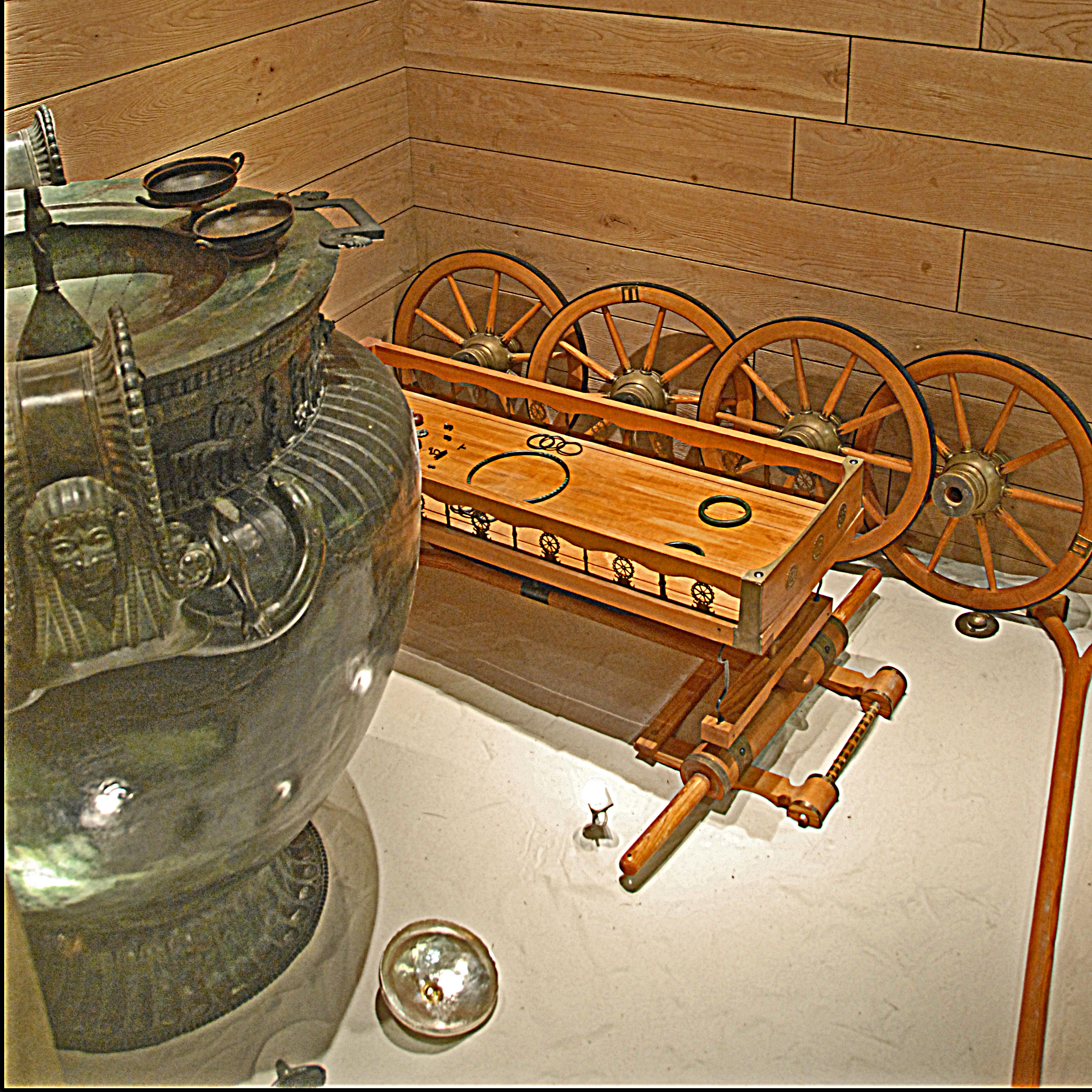
Burial chamber reconstruction

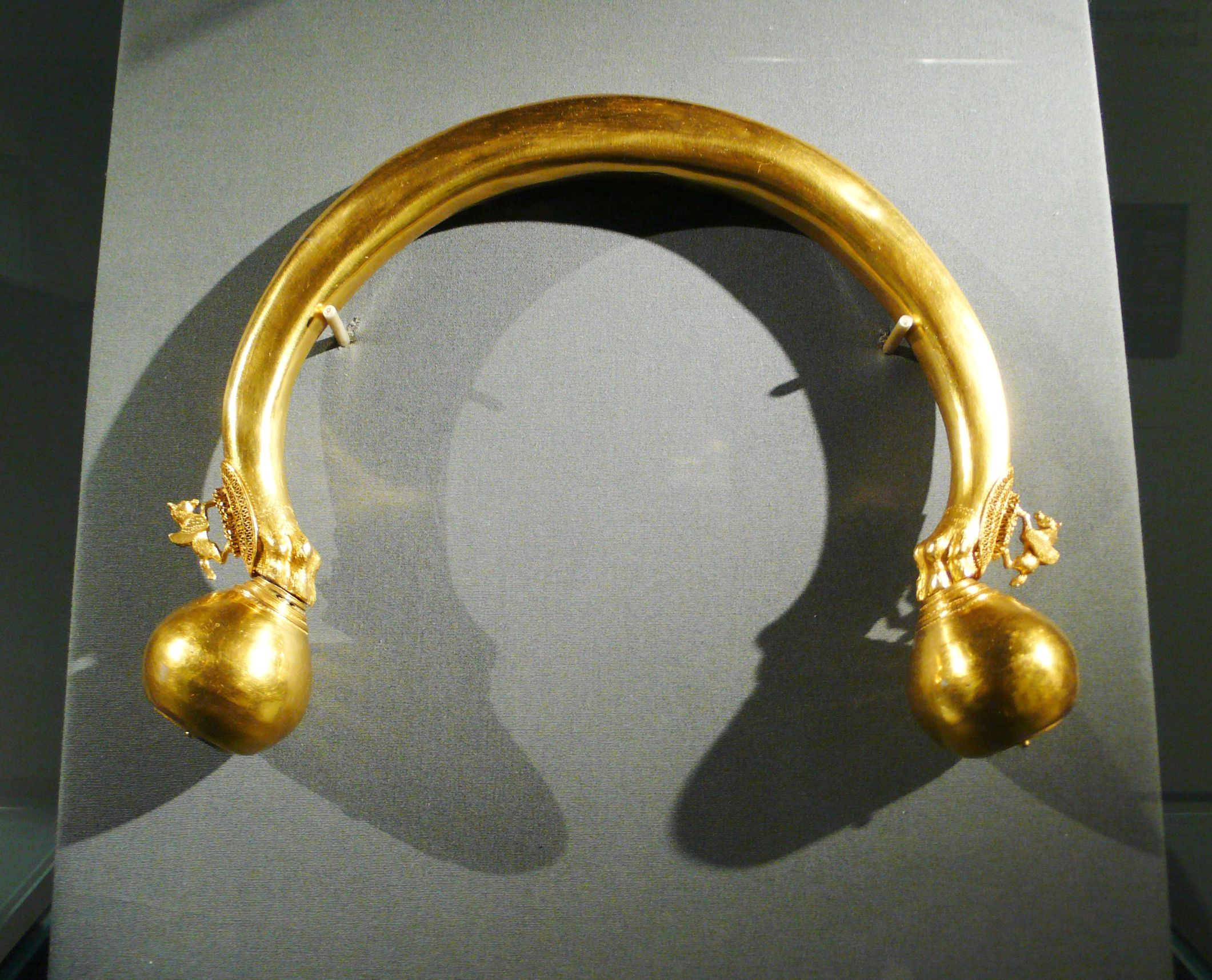
A unique 24-carat Celtic torc, whose ends are adorned with winged horses on intricate filigree pedestals and lion paws, inspired by Etruscan, Scythian or Middle Eastern bestiary

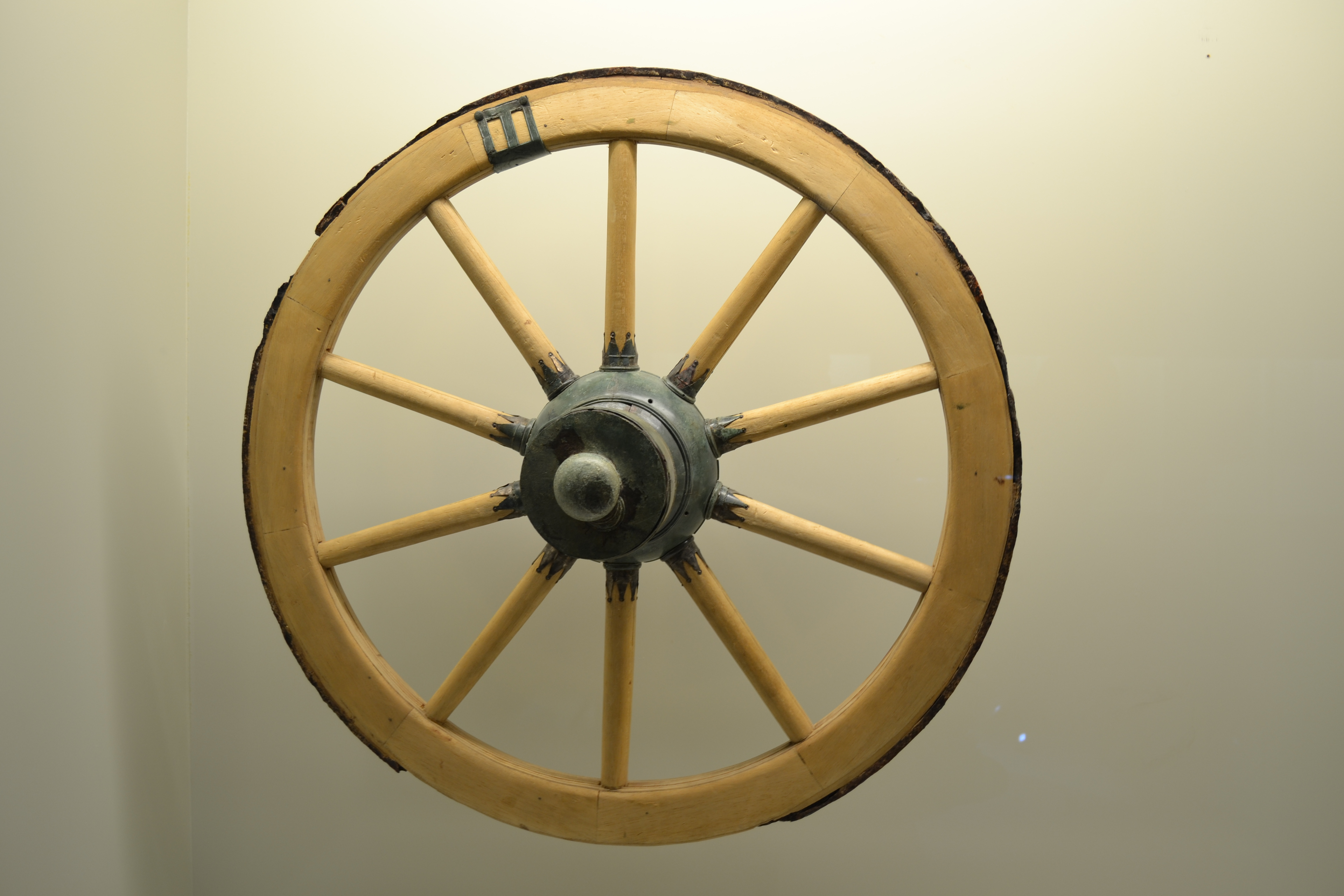
Funerary wagon wheel

The burial of "the Lady of Vix" took place around 470 BC Although decomposition of the organic contents of the grave was nearly total, the gender of the individual buried has been interpreted as female: she is accompanied by many items of jewellery, but no weaponry. Her social status is not clear and other than "Lady," names such as, Queen, Princess, or Priestess of Vix have all been used in various articles involving conjecture. There can be no doubt of her high status, as indicated by the large amounts of jewellery. She was between 35 years and 40 years old at the time of her death.

==== Burial and grave goods ====
The inhumation burial was placed in a 3 m x 3 m rectangular wooden chamber underneath a mound or tumulus of earth and stone which originally measured 40 m in diameter and 6 m in height.

Her body was laid in the freestanding box of a cart, or chariot, the wheels of which had been detached and placed beside it. Only its metal parts have survived. Her jewellery included a 480 gram 24-carat gold torc, a bronze torc, six fibulae, six slate bracelets, plus a seventh bracelet made of amber beads.

The grave also contained an assemblage of imported objects from Italy and the Greek world, all of them associated with the preparation of wine. They included the famous krater (see below), a silver phiale (shallow bowl, sometimes seen as a local product), an Etruscan bronze oinochoe (wine jug), and several drinking cups from Etruria and Attica. One of the latter was dated as c. 525 BC and represents the latest firmly dated find in the grave. It thus provides the best evidence, a terminus post quem for its date. The vessels probably were placed on wooden tables or benches that did not survive.

==== The Vix krater ====
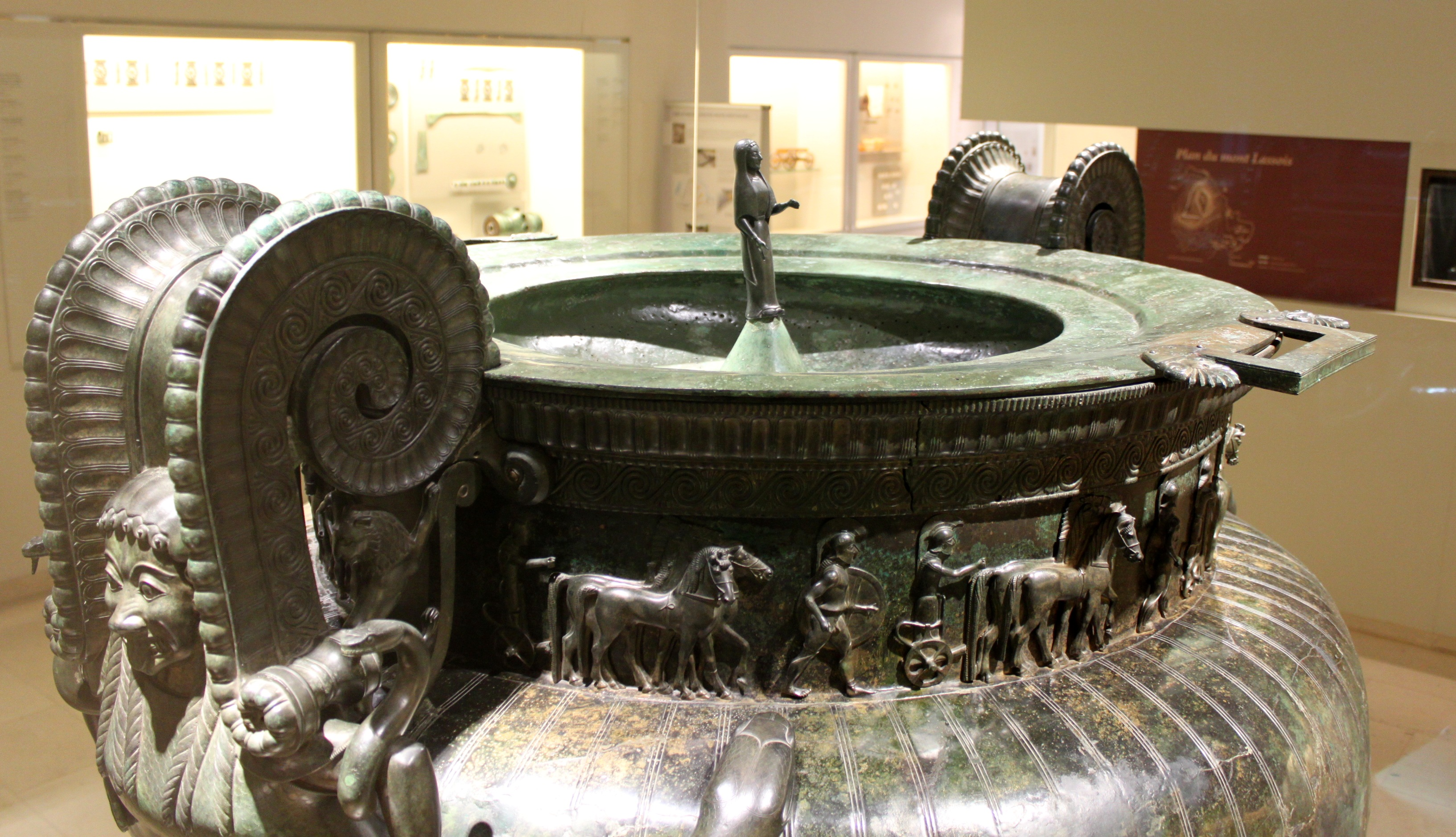
Vix krater with lid featuring a female figure. Frieze of hoplites and four-horse chariots on the rim

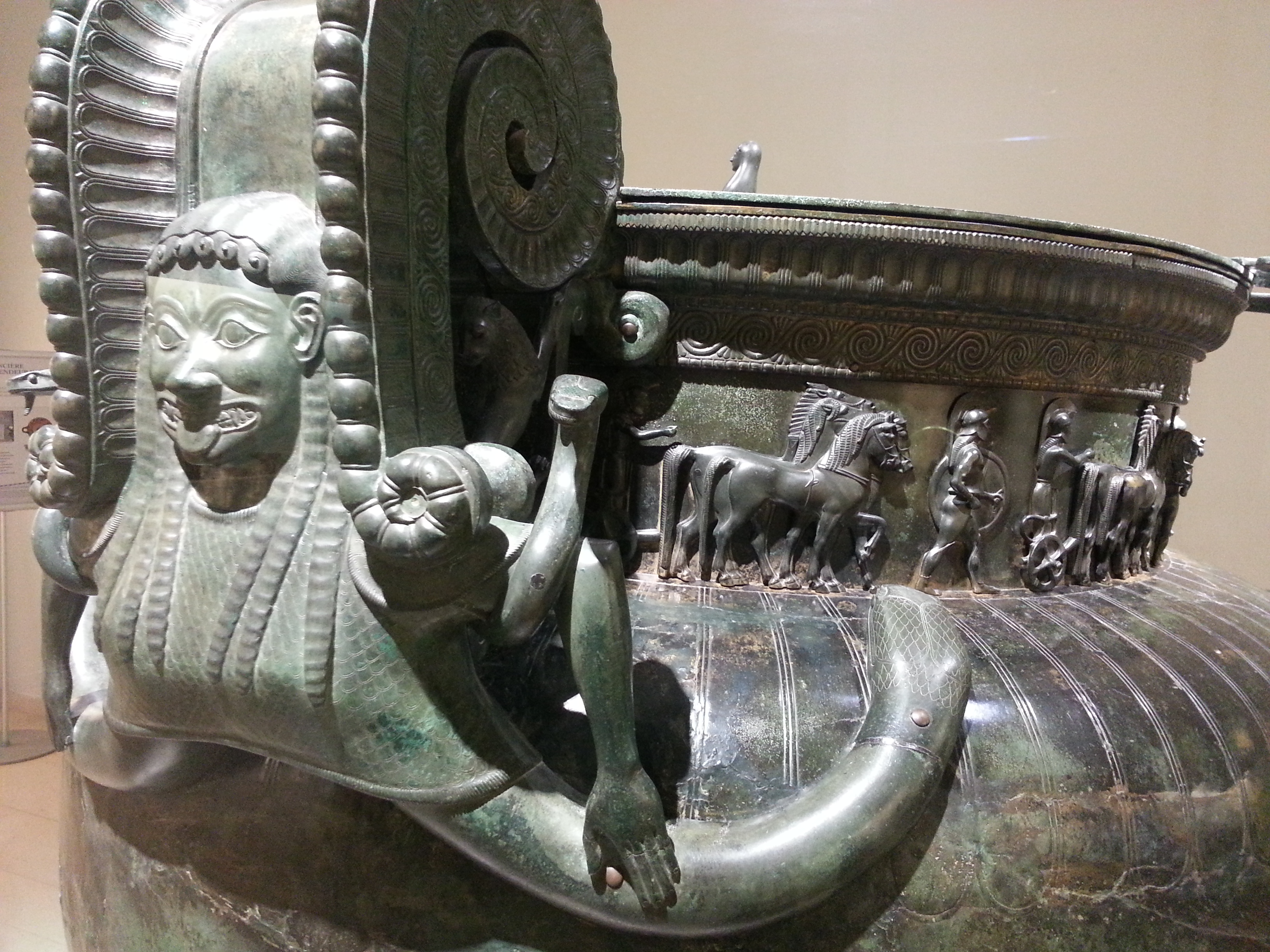
A Gorgon head is on the outside of each of the krater's two handles

The largest and most famous of the finds from the burial is an elaborately decorated bronze volute krater, 1.64 metres (5.4 ft) in height and weighing 208.6 kilograms (460 lb). Kraters were vessels for mixing wine and water, common in the Greek world, and usually made of clay. The Vix krater has become an iconic object representing both the wealth of early Celtic burials and the art of Late Archaic Greek bronze work.

- The krater was made of seven or more individual pieces with Greek alphabetical markings, indicating that it probably was transported to Burgundy in pieces and assembled in situ.
- The vase proper, made of a single sheet of hammered bronze, weighs about 60 kg. Its bottom is rounded, its maximum diameter is 1.27 m, and its capacity is 1,100 litres. Its walls are only 1 mm to 1.3 mm thick. The krater was found crushed by the weight of the tumulus material above it. It had telescoped completely: the handles were found at the same level as the base. It was restored after excavation.
- Its foot is made of a single moulded piece, its diameter is 74 cm, its weight 20.2 kg. It received the rounded bottom of the main vase and ensured its stability. It is decorated with stylised plant motifs.
- The three handles, supported by rampant lionesses, weighed about 46 kg each. Each is a 55 cm high volute, each is elaborately decorated with a grimacing gorgon, a common motif on contemporary Greek bronzes.
- A frieze of hoplites decorates the neck of the vessel, which is made of a bronze ring inserted into the main vase and supporting the handles. It depicts eight chariots, each drawn by four horses and conducted by a charioteer (depicted smaller than the hoplites for reasons of space), each is followed by a single fully armed hoplite on foot. The frieze is an important example of early Greek bronze relief art, which has rarely survived.
- The lid was a hammered bronze sheet, weighing 13.8 kg and shaped to fit the krater's opening. It is concave and perforated by multiple holes, probably because it also served as a strainer for purifying wine. A protrusion at its centre supports a 19 cm statuette of moulded bronze, depicting a woman with one outstretched arm, which once may have held some object such as a plastinx. She wears a peplos, the body-length Ancient Greek garment worn by women, and her head is covered by a veil. The statuette appears of a somewhat older style than figures on the rest of the vessel.

==== Krater significance ====
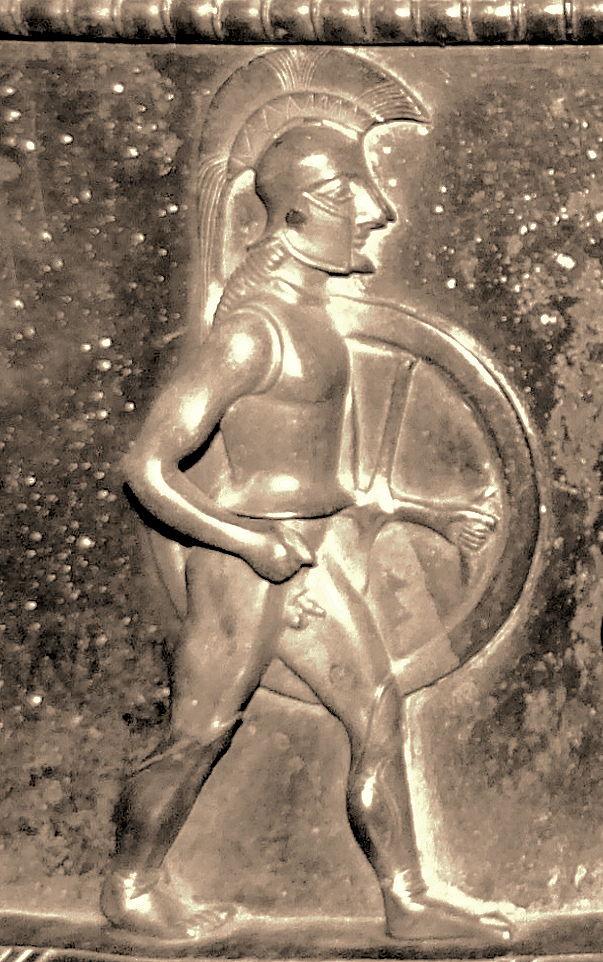
A Hoplite from the Vix Krater.

The enormous variety of apparently Mediterranean imports indicates wide-ranging trade connections; in particular, the Mediterranean material might have come to Vix with Greek or Etruscan traders (the krater may have been produced in Sybaris). The wealth of imported luxury goods at Vix is, so far, unique in Hallstatt Europe. It has been suggested that the krater, the largest known Greek bronze vessel, should be seen in a context of high-status gift exchange connected with the trade of wine from the Mediterranean for raw materials from northern Europe.

==== Exhibition and reconstruction ====
A reconstruction of the grave and the original finds are on display in the museum at Châtillon-sur-Seine.

=== Further tumuli ===
Apart from this woman's grave (mound I), there are five further known large burial mounds in the area. Three of them have been excavated so far.

- Mound II had a diameter of 33 m; its central chamber contained an urn with cremated human remains, dated by accompanying finds to c. 850 BC.
- The mound of La Butte probably dates to the mid-sixth century. As in its famous neighbouring grave, it contained a woman laid in a cart, or chariot, accompanied by two iron axes and a gold bracelet.
- A third mound, at La Garenne, was destroyed in 1846. It, too, contained a cart, as well as an Etruscan bronze bowl with four griffin. It is not known whether it contained skeletal remains.

=== Statues ===
In 1994, fragments of two stone statues, a warrior, and a figure of a woman, were discovered in a small enclosure named the Herbues sanctuary.

== Significance of site ==
The so-called "Princess of Vix", the main burial at the site, has been discussed at length by archaeologists, and the traditional identification of the individual as a female has been questioned by some. The person was likely middle-aged at death, and Knüsel's 2002 osteological analysis concludes was likely female, though with some androgynous features. The grave contained items commonly associated with men. During the original excavations of the burial in 1952, the body was generally regarded as being that of a female, but a reexamination in 1991 by Bettina Arnold raised uncertainty.

In the area, as elsewhere in central and western Europe, the early Iron Age led to changes in social organisation, including a marked tendency toward the development of social hierarchies. It seems that at the top of these hierarchies was an aristocracy that had developed in the context of the increasingly important trade in iron ore and iron. Whether they really were "princesses" or "princes" in a modern sense (i.e., a noble or religious aristocracy) or simply represented an economic or mercantile elite is still the subject of much discussion.

Evidence for these changed social conditions is seen in the richly equipped graves of this period, which stand in sharp contrast to the preceding habit of uniform simple urn burials. It is also seen in the changing settlement patterns of the region. Whereas large open settlements had previously served as central places, smaller enclosed settlements developed, often in locally prominent locations (so called manors or "princely sites"). Several of these sites are known from Late Hallstatt and Early La Tène Europe, for example, the burials at Hochdorf and Magdalenenberg, the Heuneburg settlement and the Glauberg settlement and burial complex.

Iron ores were far more widespread than the more rare copper and especially tin ores needed to produce the previously dominant bronze. Thus economic success ceased to be determined simply by access to the raw materials, but started to depend on infrastructure and trade. The increasing economic surplus in well-situated places was invested in representative settlements (and fortifications), jewellery, and expensive imported luxury materials, a differentiation not previously possible.

== Robbery ==
On 24 July 2026, the gold torc was stolen from Châtillon Museum.

== Gallery ==
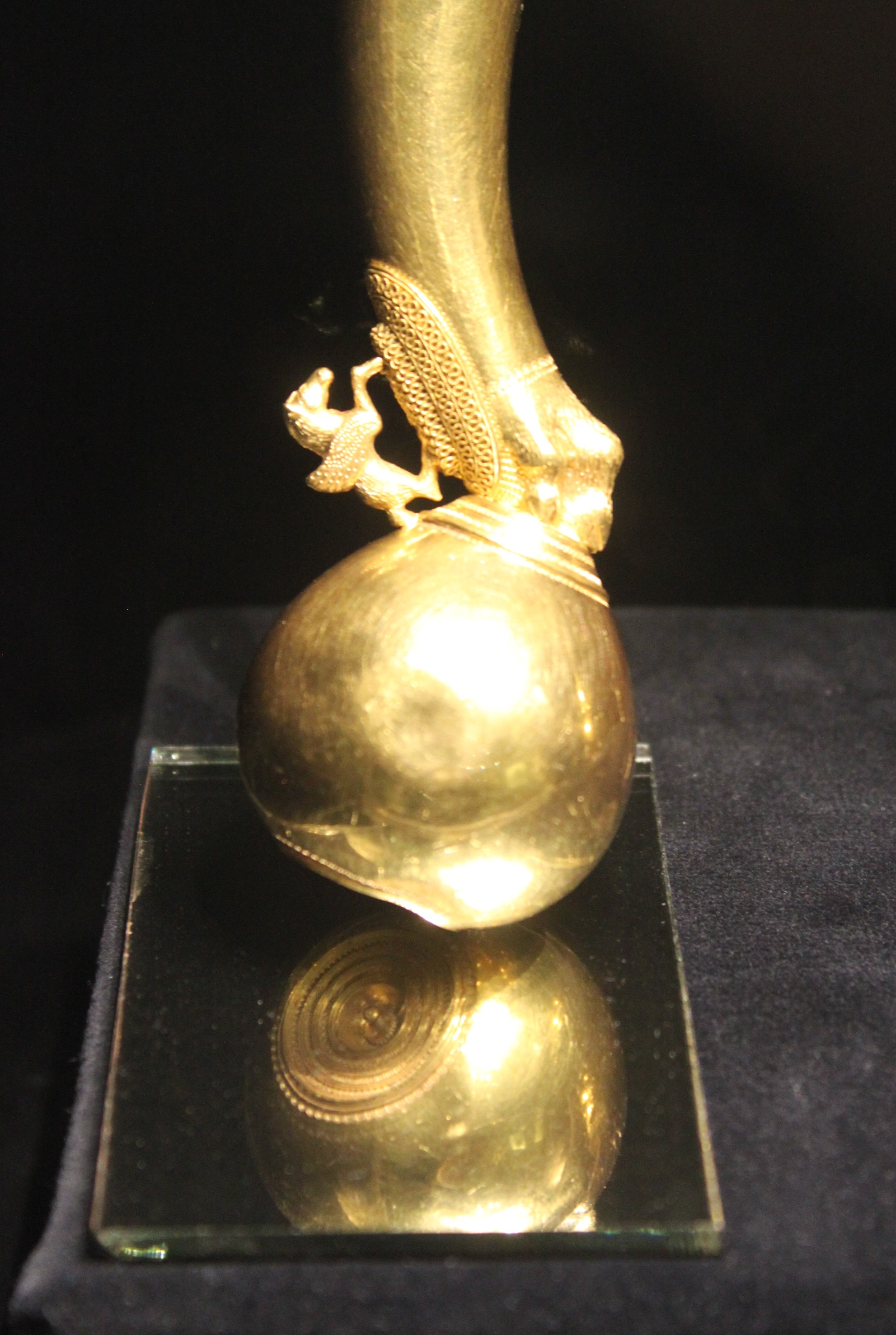
Gold torc detail

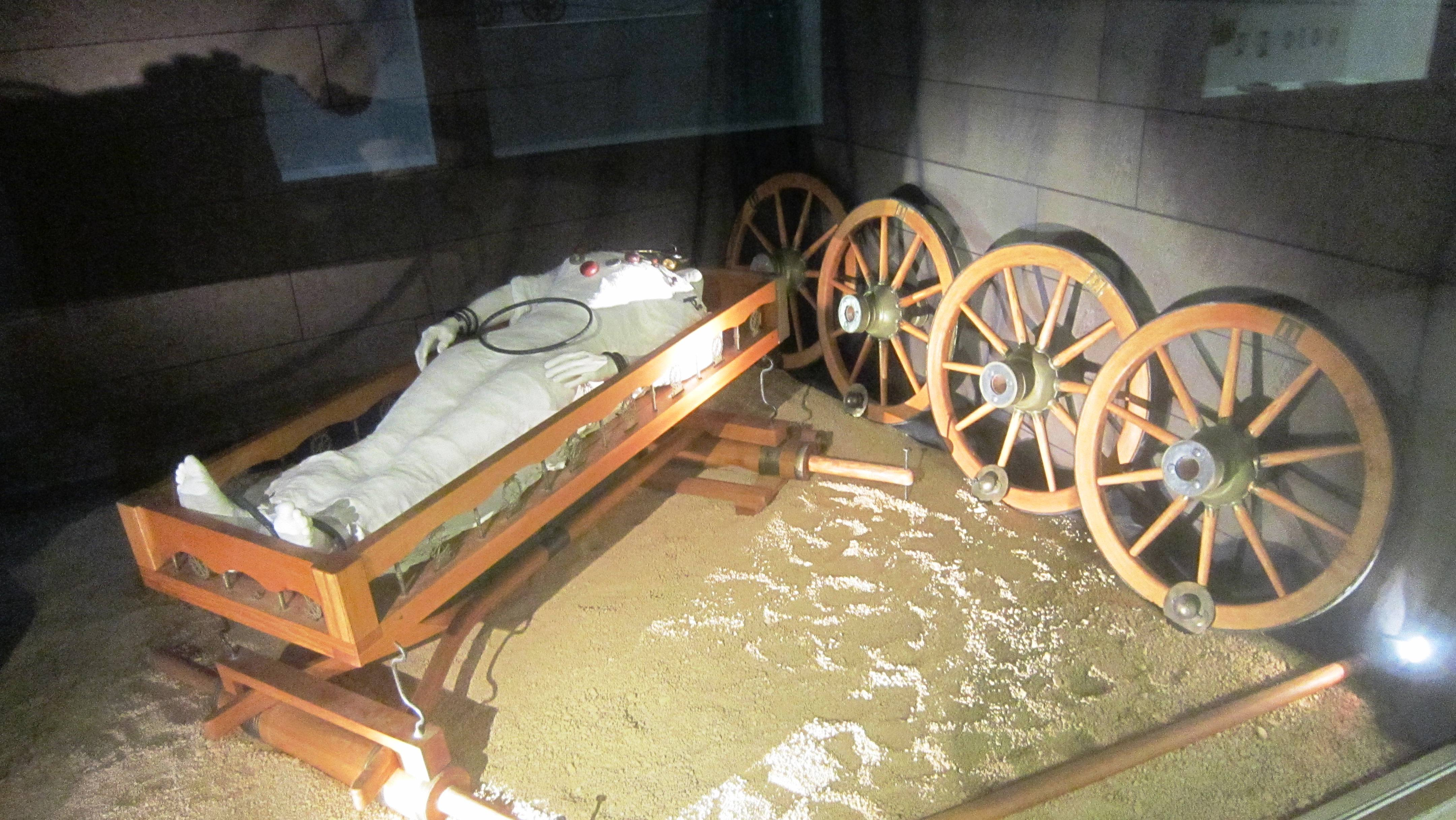
Reconstruction of the Vix burial chamber

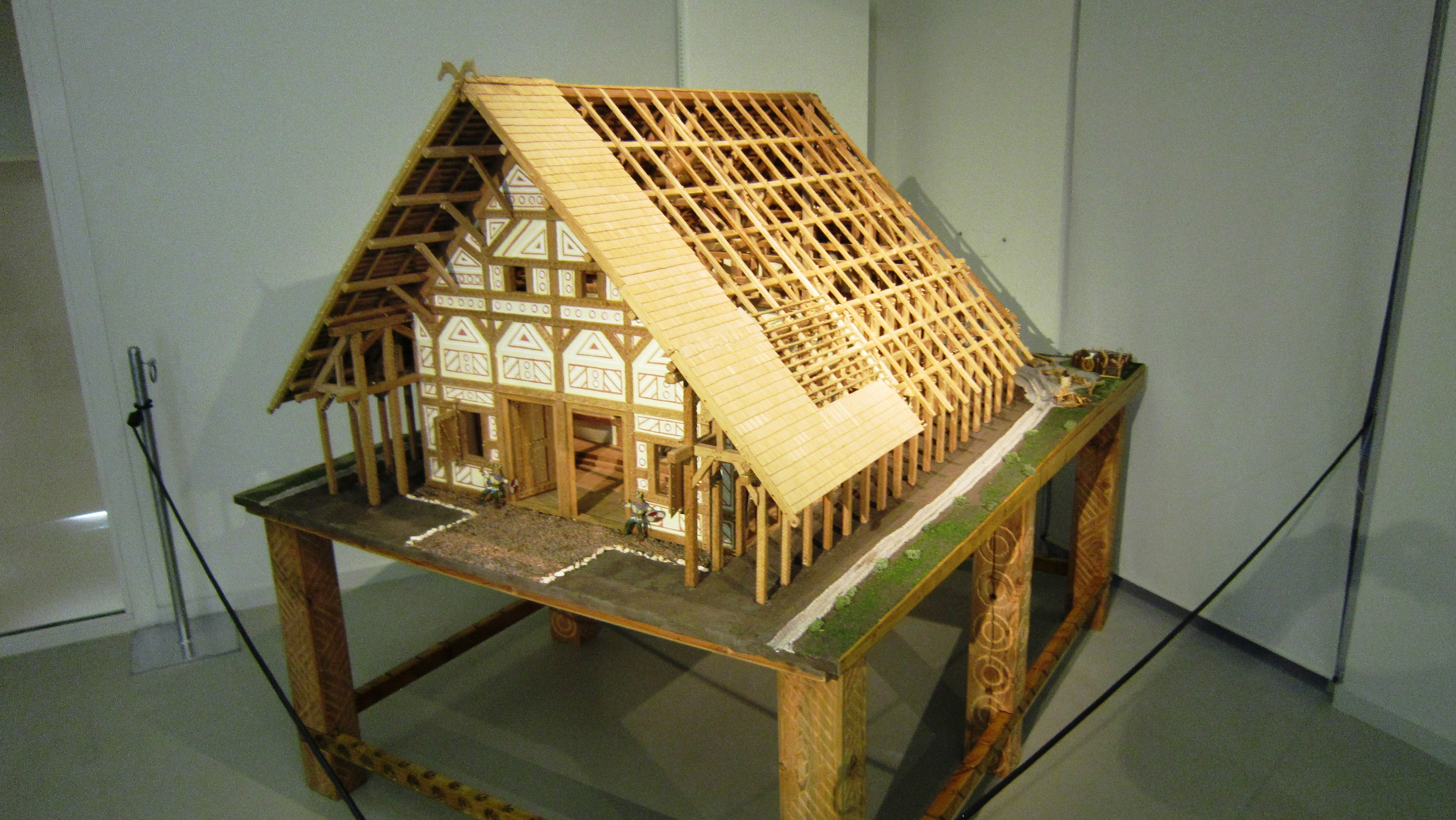
Vix palace model, Musée du Pays Châtillonnais

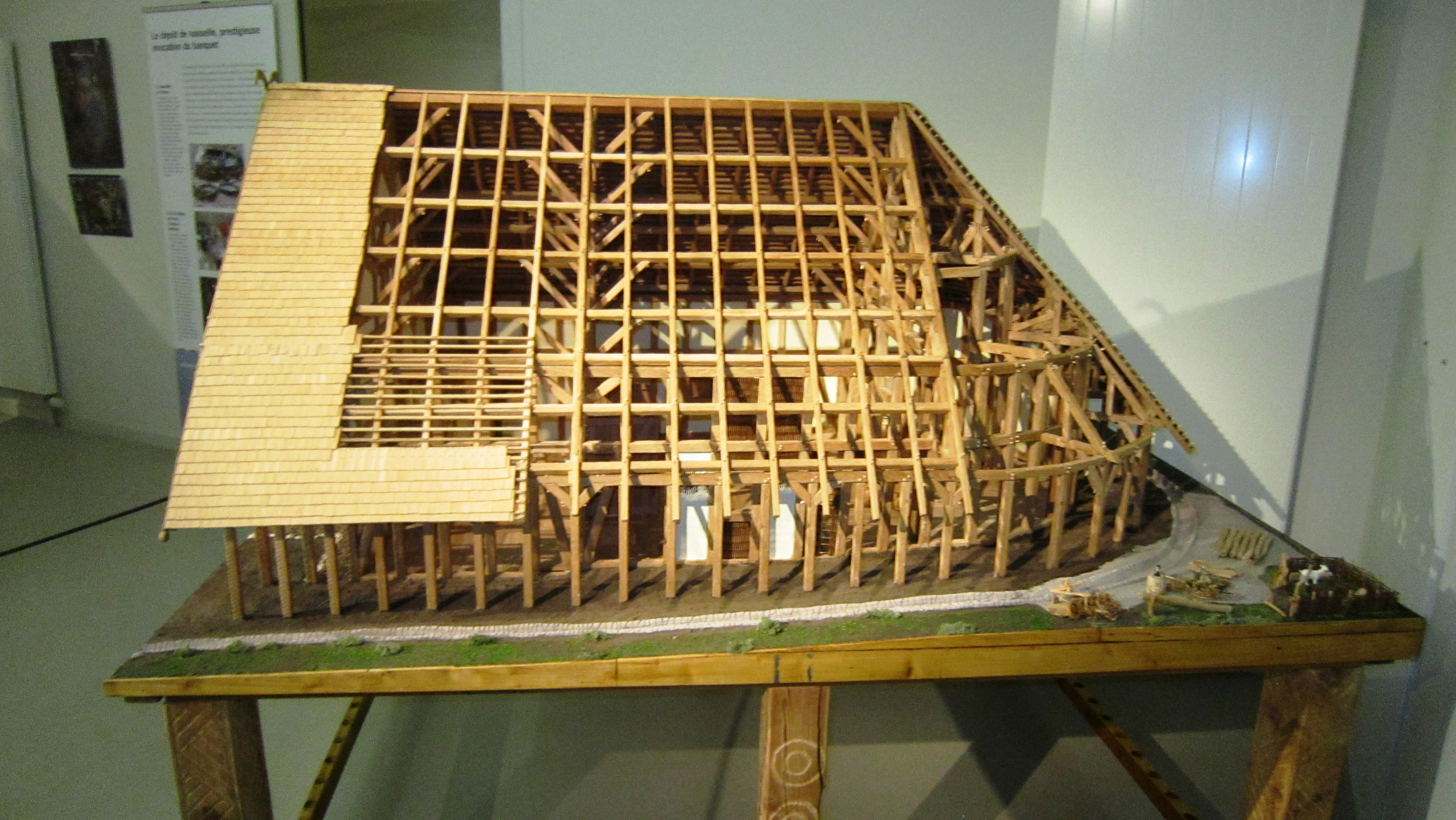
Vix palace model

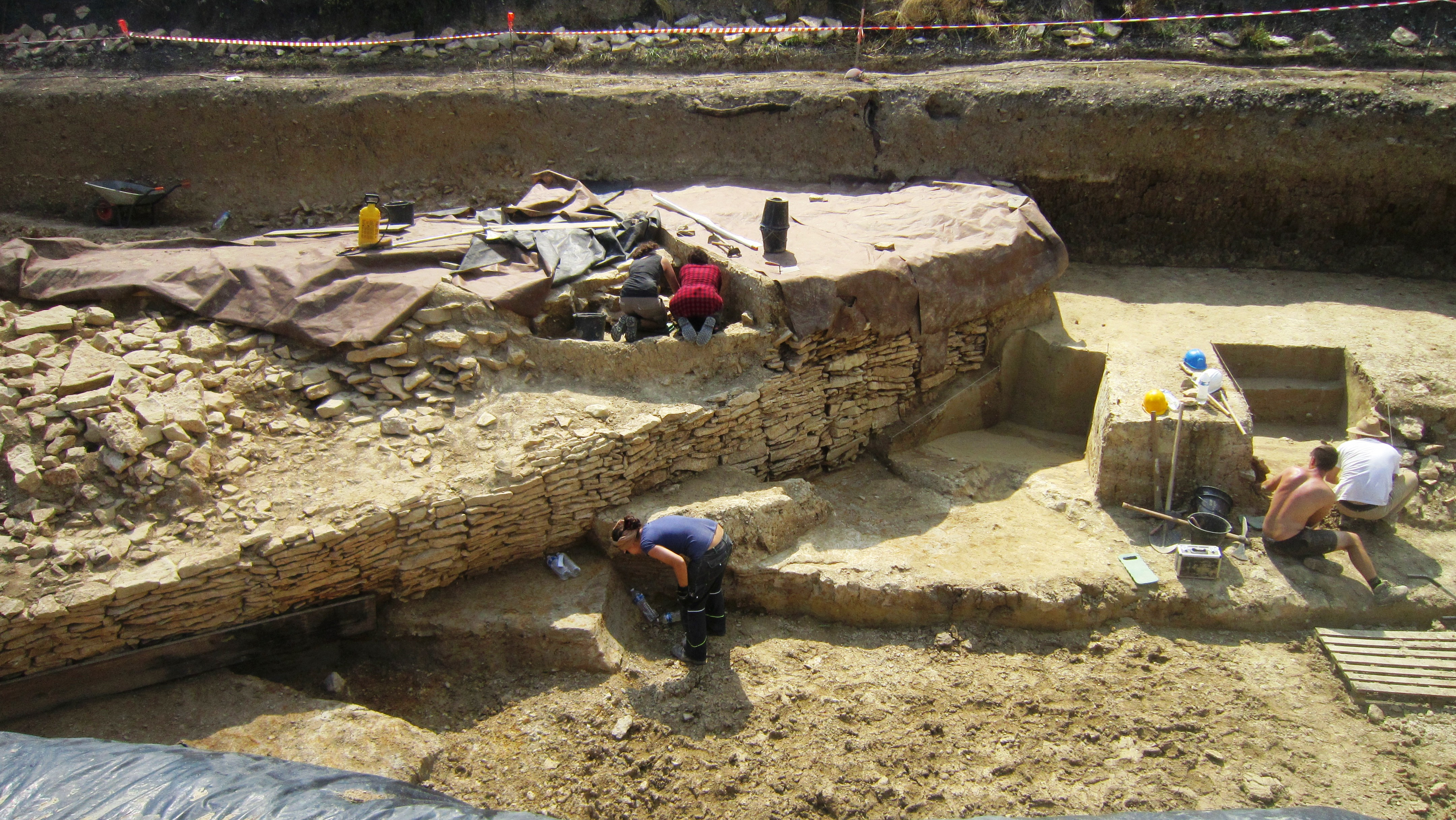
Excavation of a wall at Mont Lassois

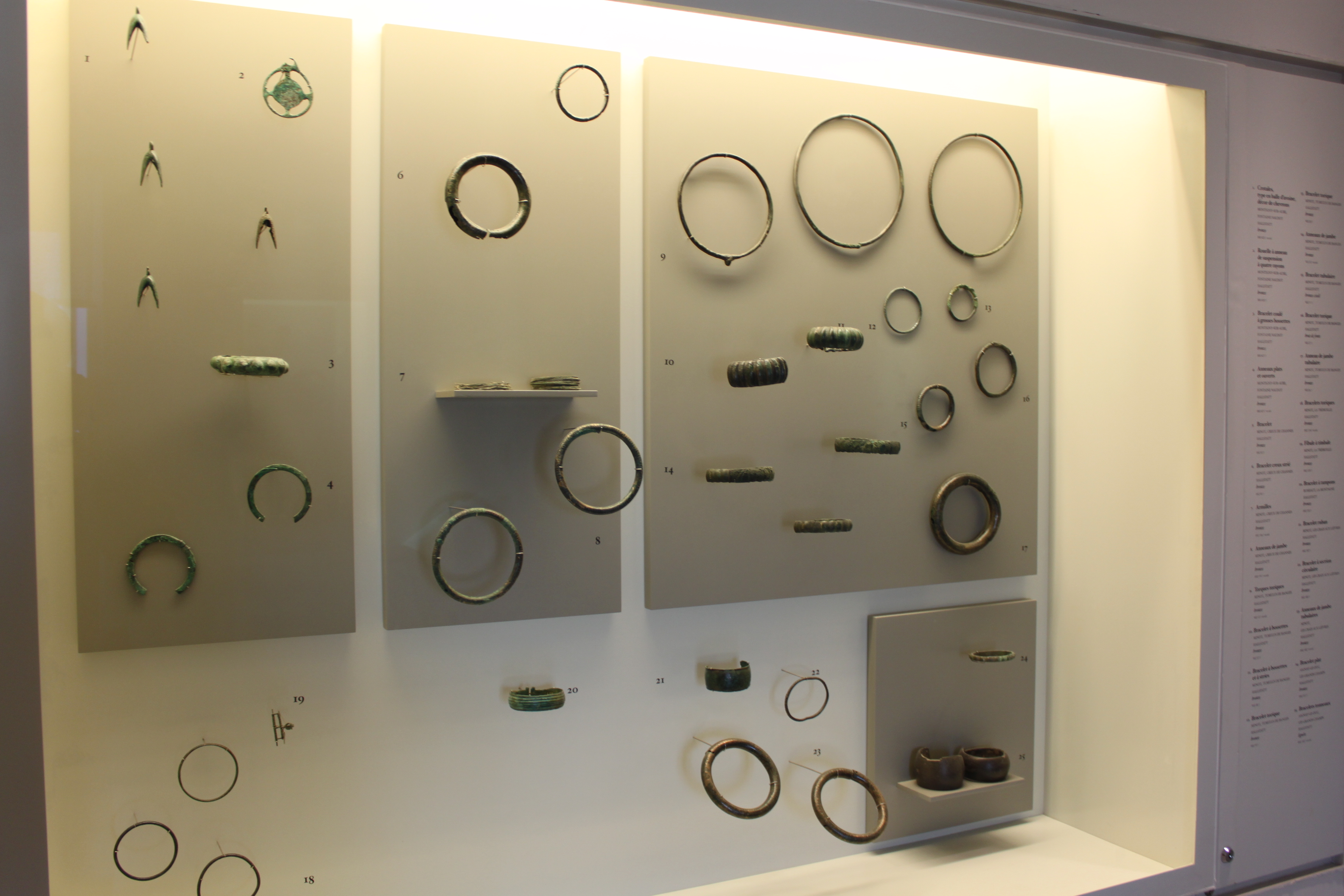
Artefacts from the Vix grave

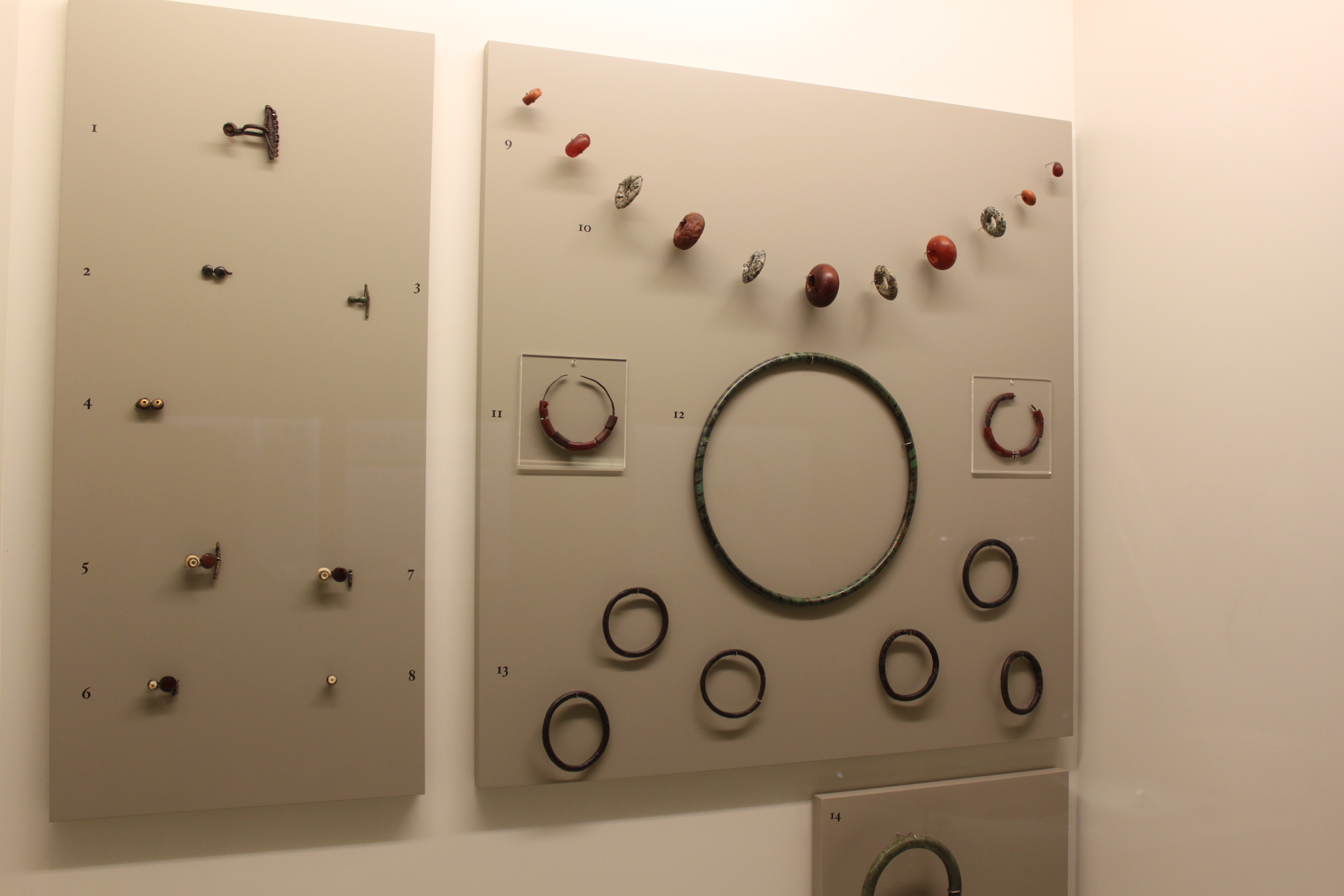
Artefacts from the Vix grave

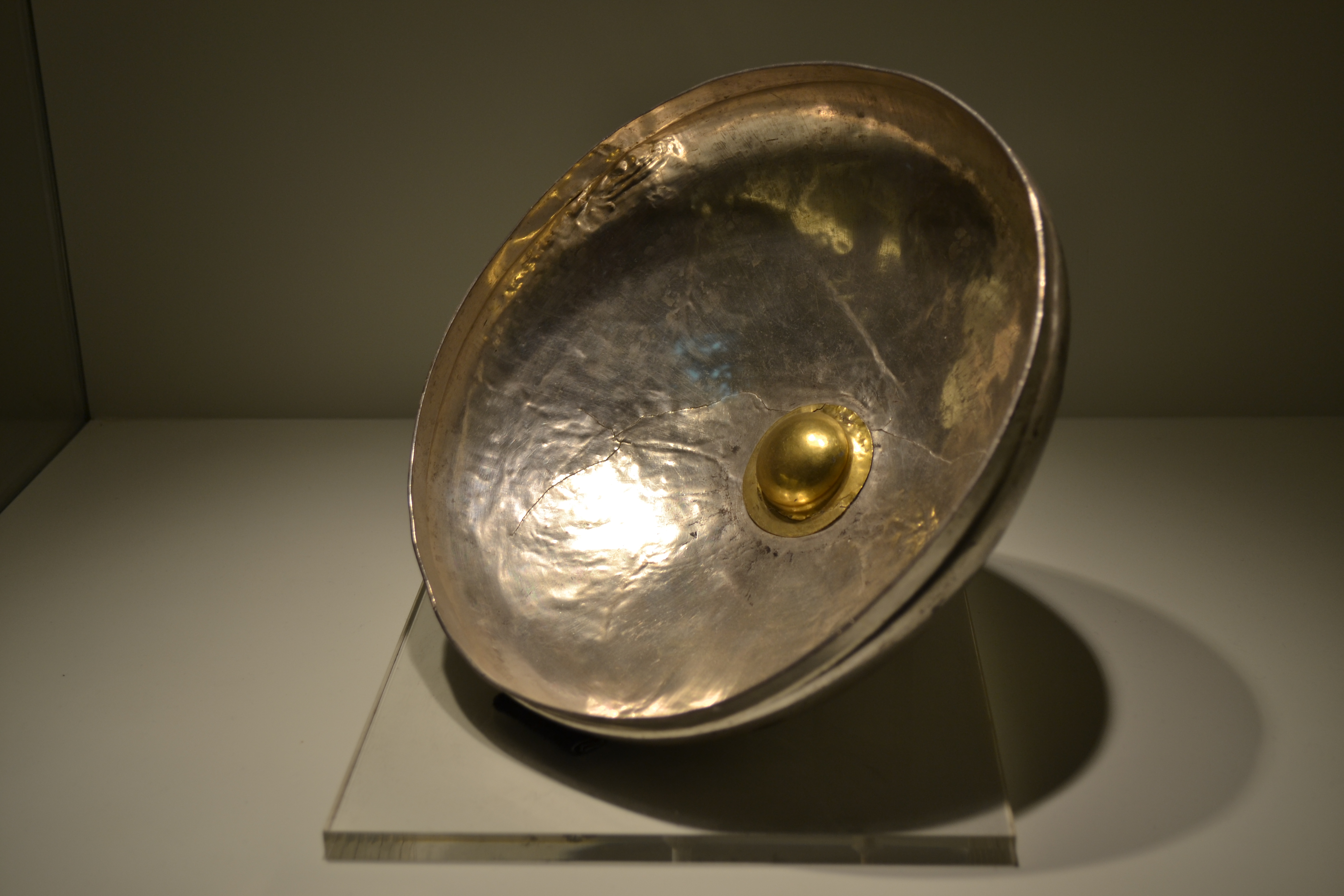
Silver phiale

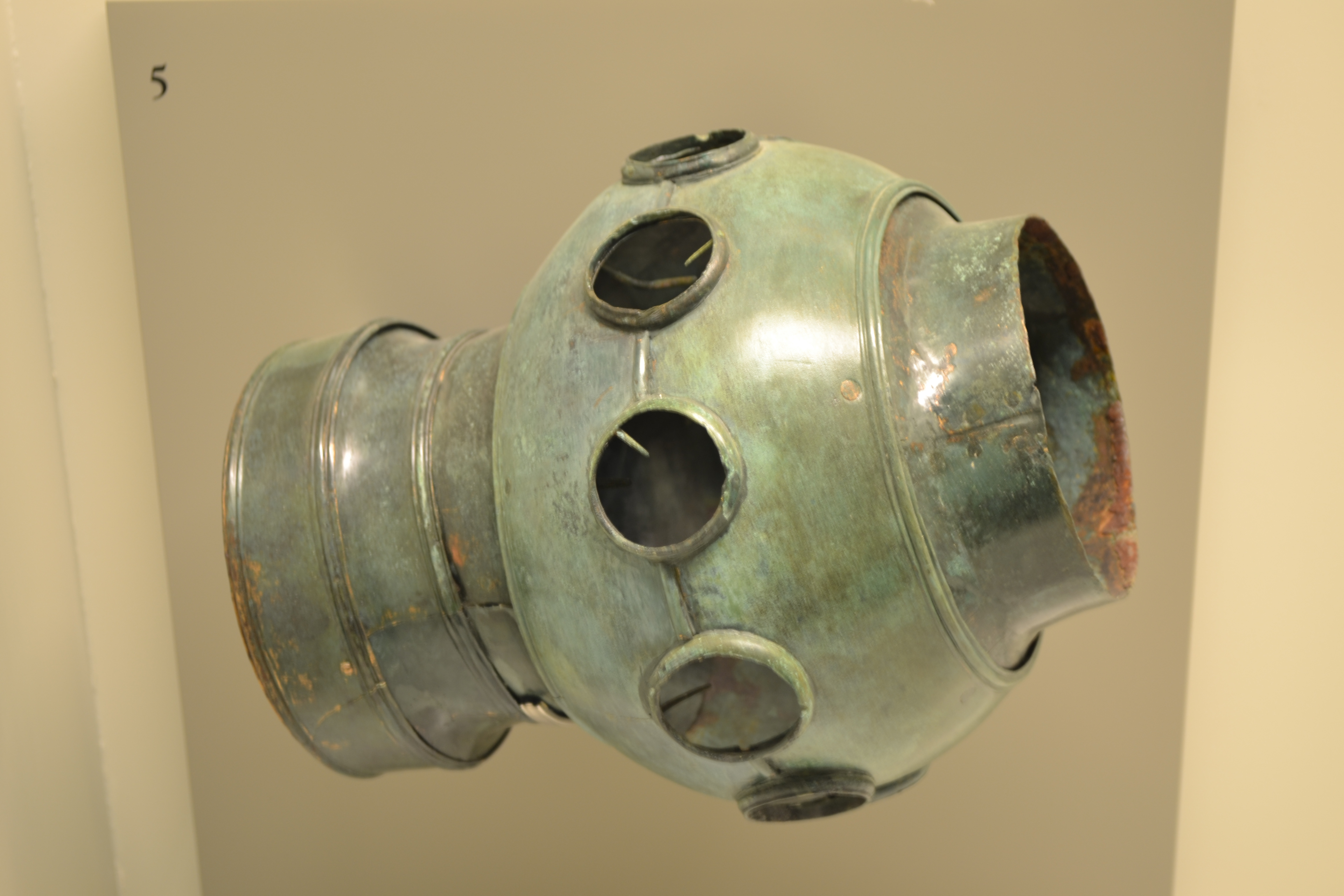
Ceremonial wagon wheel hub

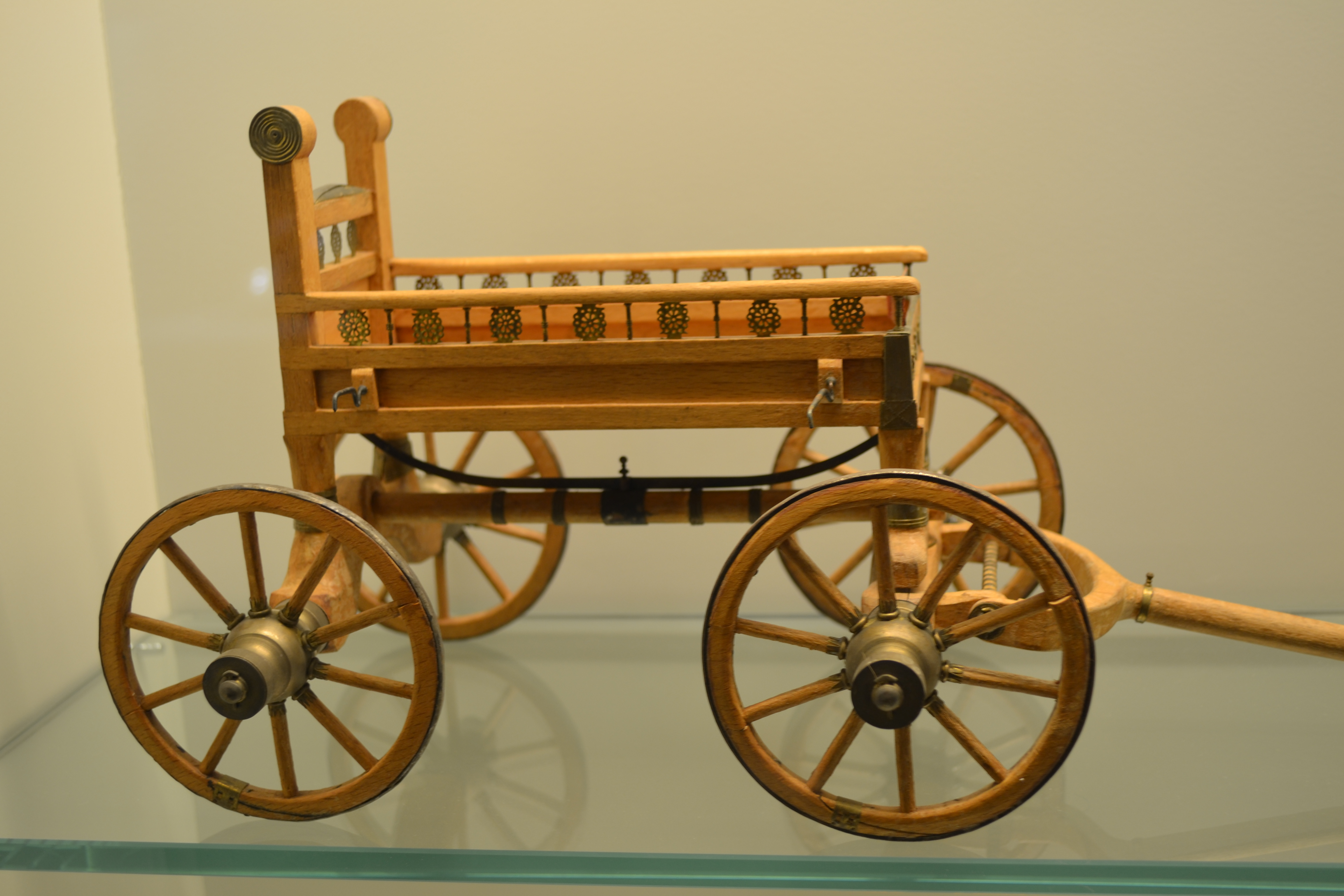
Ceremonial wagon model

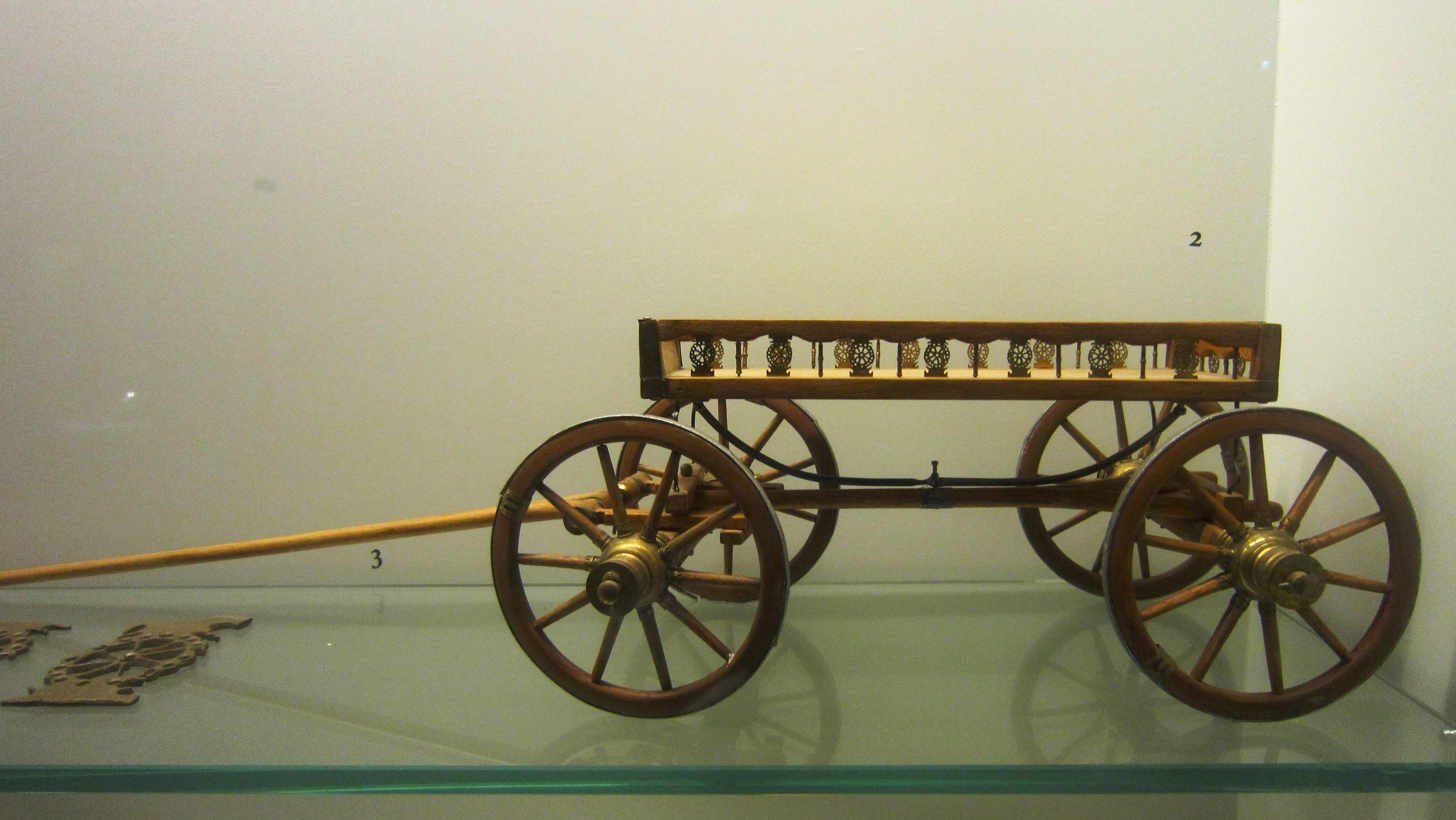
Ceremonial wagon model

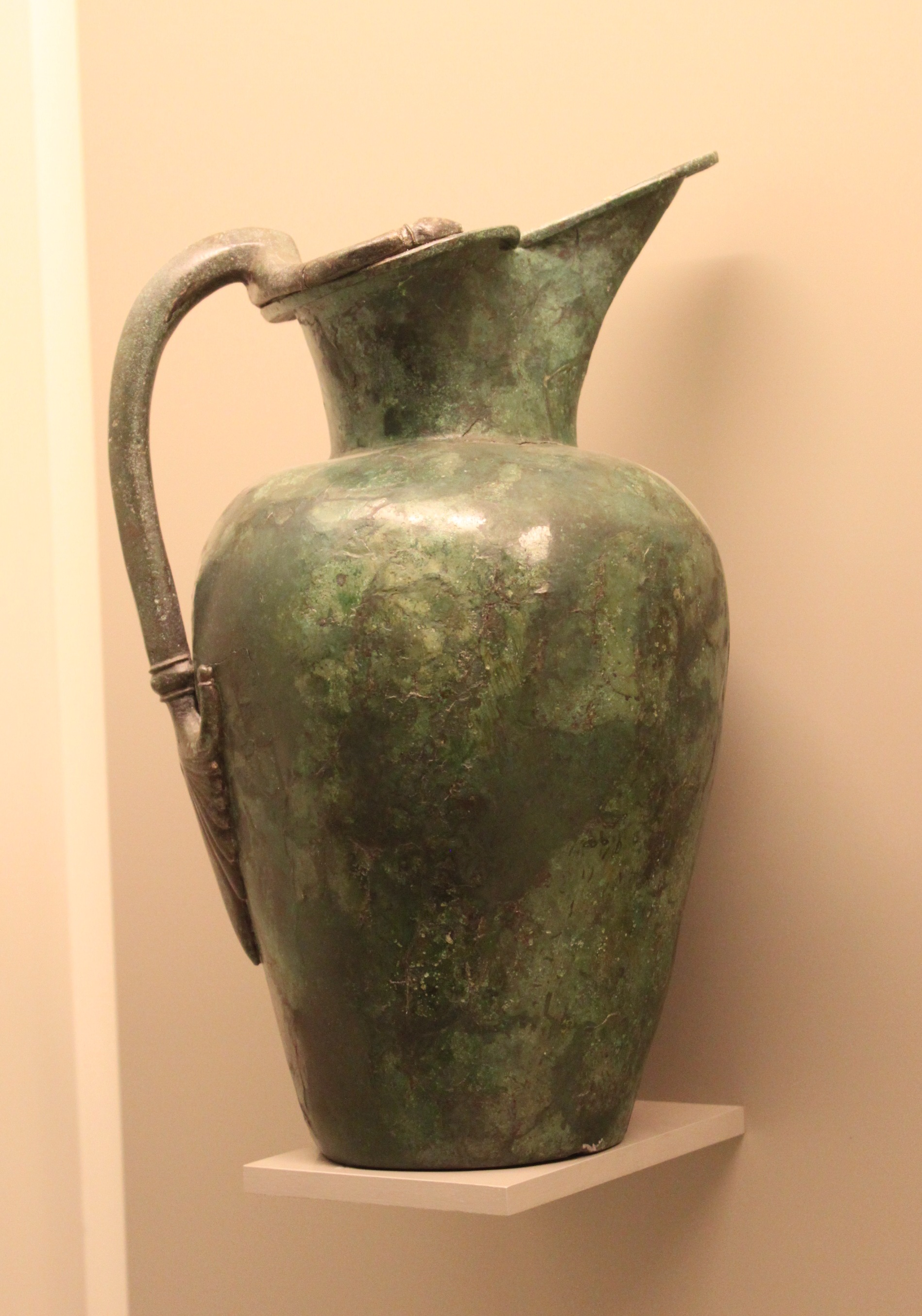
Etruscan oenochoe

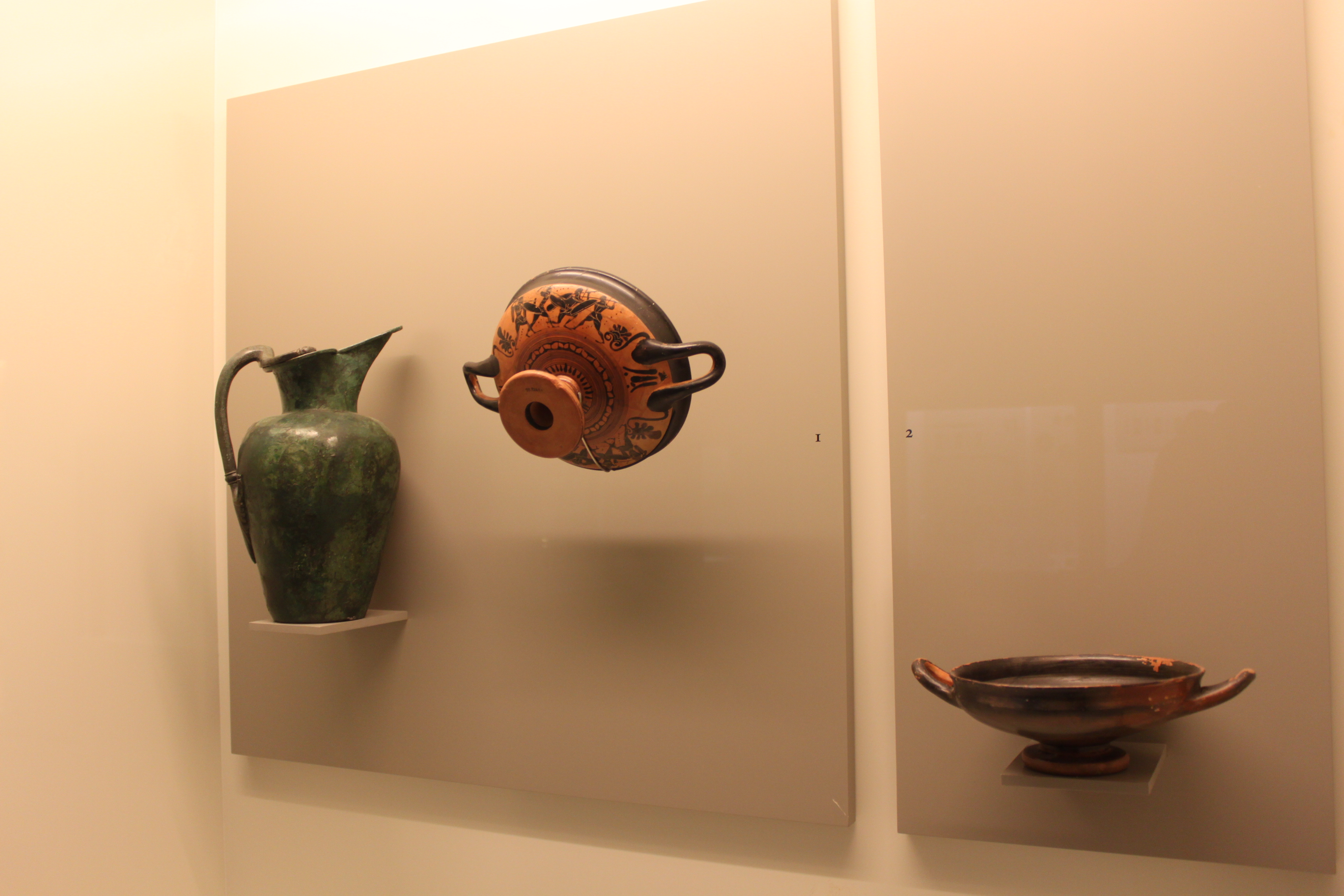
Greek pottery

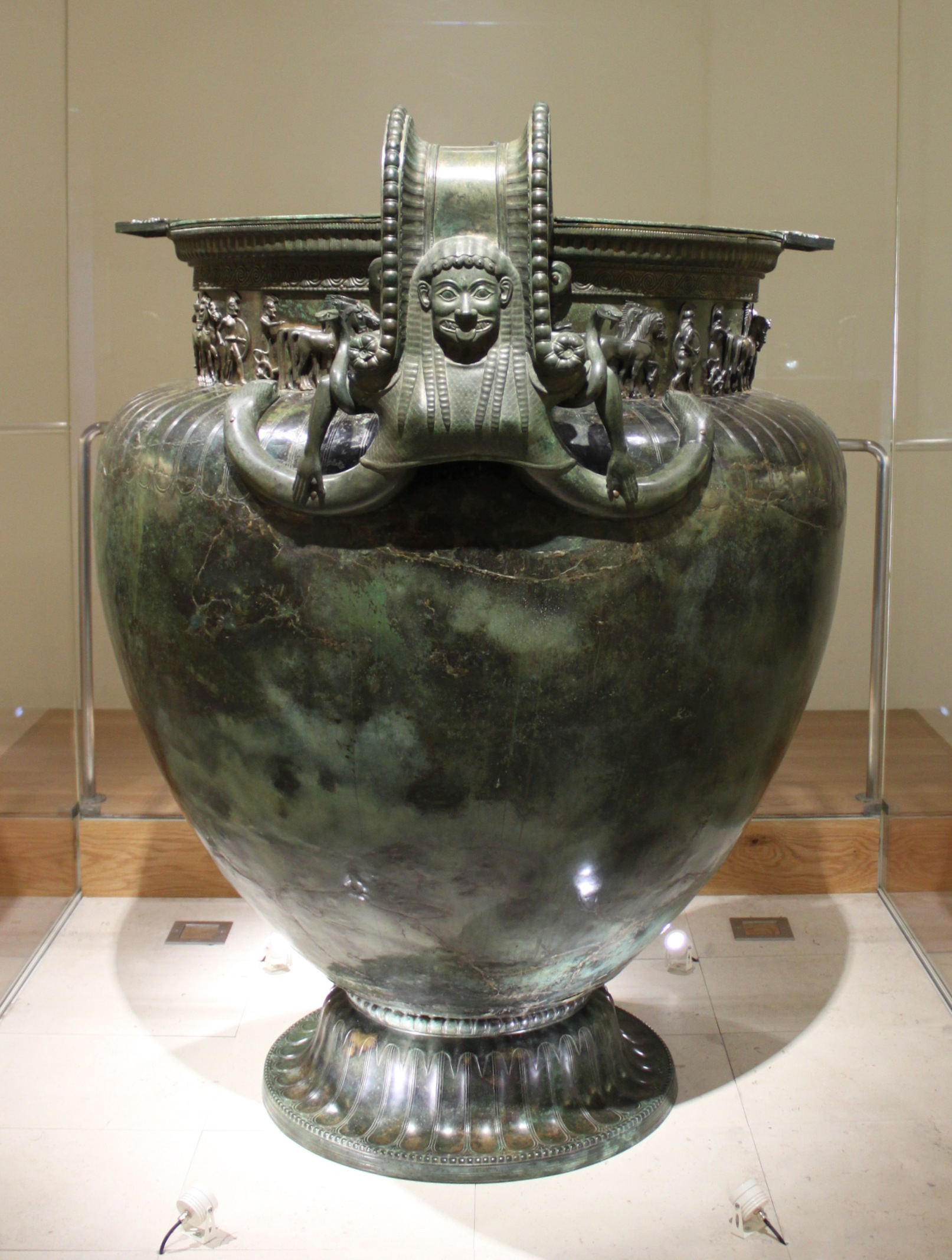
Vix krater

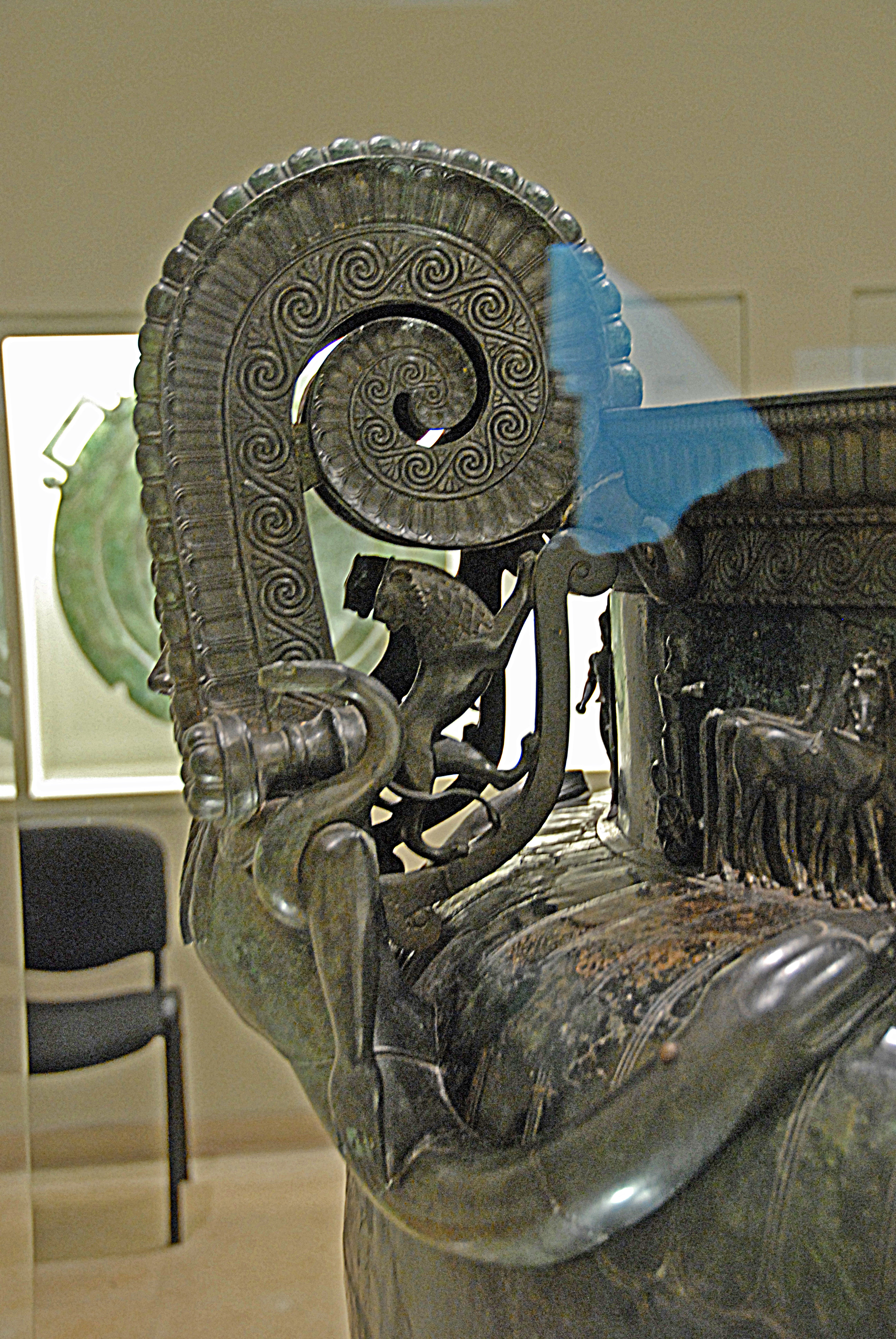
Vix krater detail

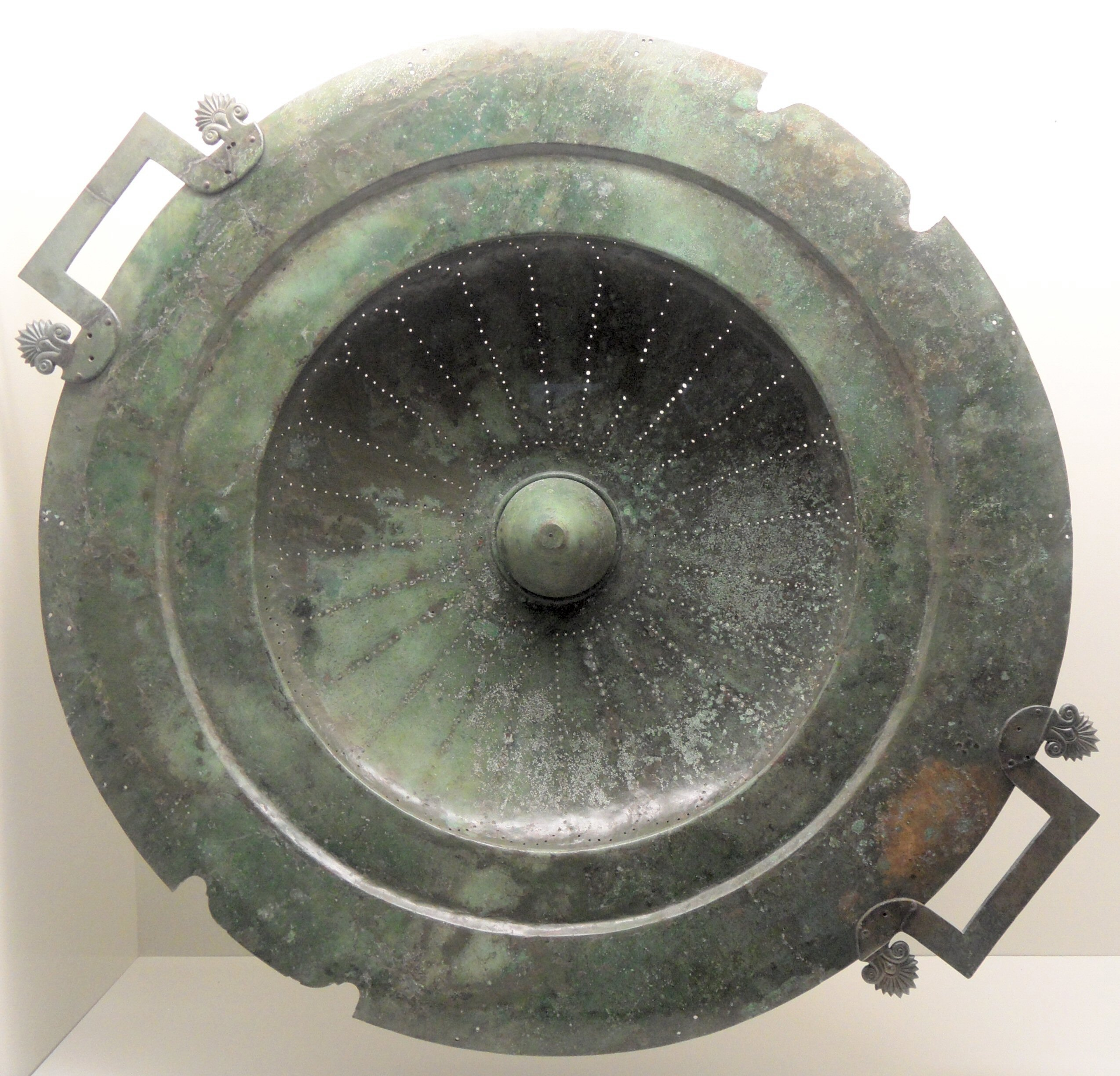
Vix krater lid

== See also ==
- Hochdorf Chieftain's Grave
- Graves of Sainte-Colombe-sur-Seine
- Lavau Grave
- Heuneburg
- Glauberg
- Hohenasperg
- Ipf (mountain)
- Burgstallkogel
- Alte Burg
- Vorstengraf (Oss)
- Grächwil
- Grafenbühl grave
- Reinheim grave
- Princely Grave of Rodenbach
- Mitterkirchen Keltendorf
- Lingons
- Oppidum of Manching

== Bibliography ==
- René Joffroy : Le Trésor de Vix (Côte d'Or). Presses Universitaires de France, Paris 1954.
- René Joffroy: Das Oppidum Mont Lassois, Gemeinde Vix, Dép Côte-d'Or. In: Germania 32, 1954, pp. 59–65.
- René Joffroy: L'Oppidum de Vix et la civilisation Hallstattienne finale dans l'Est de la France. Paris 1960.
- René Joffroy: Le Trésor de Vix. Histoire et portée d'une grande découverte. Fayard, Paris 1962.
- René Joffroy: Vix et ses trésors. Tallandier, Paris 1979.
- Franz Fischer: Frühkeltische Fürstengräber in Mitteleuropa. Antike Welt 13, Sondernummer. Raggi-Verl., Feldmeilen/Freiburg. 1982.
- Bruno Chaume: Vix et son territoire à l'Age du fer: fouilles du mont Lassois et environnement du site princier. Montagnac 2001, ISBN 2907303473.
- Bruno Chaume, Walter Reinhard: Fürstensitze westlich des Rheins, in: Archäologie in Deutschland 1, 2002, pp. 9–14.
- Claude Rolley (ed.): La tombe princière de Vix, Paris 2003, ISBN 2708406973
- Vix, le cinquantenaire d'une découverte. Dossier d'Archéologie N° 284, Juin 2003.
- Bruno Chaume/Tamara Grübel et al.: Vix/Le mont Lassois. Recherches récentes sur le complexe aristocratique. In: Bourgogne, du Paléolithique au Moyen Âge, Dossiers d'Archéologie N° Hors Série 11, Dijon 2004, pp. 30–37.
