= Claude Rolley =

French archaeologist

- Born: 11 November 1933; Saint-Lô, France
- Died: 10 February 2007 (aged 73); Paris, France
- Education: Lycée Louis-le-Grand
- Alma mater: École normale supérieure
- Occupation: Archeologist

Claude Rolley (11 November 1933, Saint-Lô (Manche) – 10 February 2007) was a French archaeologist, emeritus at the University of Burgundy, writer on art, archaeology of Greece and Gaule.

== Selected publications ==
- « Une amphore inédite du Peintre à la Gorgone », in Bulletin de correspondance hellénique, année 1961, vol. 85, n°85, (p. 539–543).
- « Deux têtes féminines d'époque classique », in Bulletin de correspondance hellénique, vol.89, n°89, 1965 (p. 317–331).
- « Le Sanctuaire des dieux Patrôoi et le Thesmophorion de Thasos », in Bulletin de correspondance hellénique, n°89, 1965, (p. 441–482)
- « Antiquités, Donation Granville », in Bulletin des Musées Royaux d'Art et d'Histoire, vol.37, T. III, publication du musée des beaux-arts de Dijon, 1967, (p. 12–77)
- « Bronzes géométriques et orientaux à Délos », in Bulletin de correspondance hellenique, Supplément, Vol. 1, issue suppl 1, 1973, (p. 491–524)
- « Deux lions, deux couteaux », in L'Écho d'Auxerre, n°115, 1975.
- « D'où vient la Vénus de Saint-Père? », in Congrès de l'Association Bourguignonne des Sociétés Savantes, 1981.
- Bronzes antiques de l'Yonne, Musée archéologique de Dijon, with Claude Mordant, Jean Guillaumet et musée archéologique, 1982.
- Les bronzes grecs, Office du Livre, Fribourg, 1983, 270 p.
- De Delphes à Magny-Lambert, Hommages à Lucien Lerat, 2-Paris, 1984, (p. 727–733)
- Greek Bronzes, Sotheby's, première édition, juillet 1986 ISBN 0856673005
- « Le Sanctuaire d'Evraiokastro », in Lazarivdh, 1986, (p. 405–408).
- « Importations Méditerranéennes et repères chronologiques », in Les Princes celtes en Méditerranée, rencontres de l'École du Louvre, La Documentation Française, May 1988, (p. 93–102).
- « La Sardaigne entre deux livres, Trafics des Bronzes au début du 1er millénaire Av.J-C. », in Mélanges de l'École française de Rome, 100, fasc. 1, 1988, (p. 299–304).
- with William Mouret, R. Boyer, Techniques antiques du bronze; faire un vase, faire un casque, faire une fibule, Dijon, université de Bourgogne, Centre de recherches sur les techniques gréco-romaines, 91, 1988, (p. 18) ISBN 2900119138
- « Les Deux têtes de Nod-sur-Seine, (Côte-d'Or), proposition de datation », in Revue archéologique de l'Est et du Centre-Est, 40, fasc. 2, 1989, (p. 259–262).
- with Jean-Paul Delor, « L'Yonne et son passé; 30 ans d'archéologie », [catalogue de l'exposition d'Auxerre en 1989], édition CDRA, CRRAB, Auxerre, 1989, 321 p.
- « L'Yonne et son passé », in Archéologia [préhistoire et archéologie-Dijon], t.255, 1990, (p. 48–55).
- « Les bronzes grecs et romains, recherches récentes », in Revue archéologique, X-XII, 1990, (p. 405–422).
- With Michel Feuchère, La vaisselle tardo-républicaine en bronze, [acte de la table-ronde CNRS, organisée à Lattes du 26 au 28 avril 1990], Dijon, Université de Bourgogne, Centre de recherches sur les techniques gréco-romaines, VI, 1991, 211p., ISBN 2900119146
- « Le cas de la Grèce : l'origine des sanctuaires », in Les sanctuaires celtiques et le Monde méditerranéen, [Actes du Colloque de Saint-Riquier], 8-11 novembre 1990, Paris, 1991, (p. 136–138).
- « Les bronzes grecs et romains, recherches récentes XIII-Varia 1989 », in Revue archéologique, Paris, 1991,(p. 281–296).
- « Les Messapiens : un peuple indigène d'Italie du Sud », in Archéologia, n°269, Dijon, 1991, (p. 44–50).
- « Un bracelet celtique dans le Châtillonnais », in Revue archéologique de l'Est et du Centre-Est, 43, fasc. 1, n°161, 1992, (p. 151–153).
- « Un dieu Gaulois près de Vezelay », in Bulletin de la Société d'études d'Avallon, 74, 1993
- « Une importation à supprimer; le trépied d'Auxerre », in Revue archéologique de l'Est et du Centre-Est, 44, fasc. 1, n°163, 1993, (p. 191–192).
- Dieu de bronze, dieux de pierre, dieux de terre; y a-t-il un répertoire des bronziers en Gaule?, [actes du Congreso internacional de bronce antiguos (Madrid, novembre 1990)], 1993, (p. 367–381).
- « La Déesse sur le bateau des sources de la Seine », in Akten der 10.Tagung über antike Bronzen, 1994, (p. 371–372).
- La Sculpture grecque, des origines au milieu du Ve, T.I, Paris, Éd. Picard, 1994, 440p., 48 illustrations, ISBN 2708404482
- « Les Bronzes grecs et romains : recherches récentes », in Revue archéologique, fasc.2, 1994, (p. 323–346).
- « Les Bronzes grecs et romains : recherches récentes », in Revue archéologique, t.II, 1996, (p. 269–291).
- « Les Échanges », in Vix et les éphémères principautés celtiques, Paris, 1997, (p. 239–242).
- « Les Bronzes grecs et romains, recherches récentes », in Revue archéologique, fasc. 2, 1997, (p. 313–315).
- « Encore les aphidrumata sur la foundation de Marseille, de Thasos et de Rome », in AION (Arch) (Annali delle' Istuto universitario orientale di Napoli. Dipart. di studi del mondo classico e del Medterraneo antico. Sezione di archeologia e storia antica -Napoli), t.4, 1997, (p. 35–43).
- with Fabienne Olmer, Les Amphores romaines en Bourgogne : contribution à l'histoire économique de la région dans l'Antiquité, depuis la Tène finale jusqu'au Haut-Empire, 4 vol., 1997, 361 p.
- La sculpture grecque. La période classique. Éditions A&J Picard. 1999.
- with Michel Pernod, Techniques antiques du bronze, 2. Méthodes d'études-procédés de fabrication, Dijon, université de Bourgogne, Centre de Recherches sur les techniques gréco-romaines, 1999, 78 p. ISBN 2900119162
- « Aphrodite », in La Sculpture grecque, t.II., « La période classique », Paris. 1999, 440 p., (p. 213–258) ISBN 2708405063
- with Jean-Paul Delor, « Nécropole de Gurgy "La Picardie" (Yonne) », in Mémoire de la Société archéologique champenoise, 15, 1999, (p. 341–356).
- with Claude Péquinot, Ginette Picard et la contribution de Jean-Paul Guillaumet, Roland Niaux, Raphël Moreau, « Le Morvan gaulois », in Bulletin de Académie du Morvan, n°51, 2001.
- with Claude Péquinot, Ginette Picard et la collaboration de Vincent Guichard, Michel Kasprzyk, Pierre Nouvel, René Goguey, « Le Morvan gallo-romain », in Bulletin de l'Académie du Morvan n°59, 2001.
- with Claude Mordant, Bruno Chaume, Vix et son territoire à l'Âge du Fer, Montagnac, Éd. Monique Mergoil, 2001, 643 p. ISBN 2907303473
- « Au musée des Antiquités nationales de Saint-Germain-en-Laye. Une panthère gréco-romaine en bronze : une nouvelle restauration, nouvelles observations », in Revue du Louvre et des musées de France, t.52, 5, 2002 (p. 78–85).
- « Le travail du bronze à Delphes », in I Bronzi Antichi:Produzione e tecnologia -Montagnac, 2002, (p. 94–99).
- La Tombe princière de Vix, 2 vol., Société des Amis du musée du Châtillonnais, Paris, Éd. Picard, 2003, 383 p. ISBN 2708406973
- « La Tombe princière de Vix dans son contexte historique », in Les Dossiers d'archéologie, n°284, 2003, (p. 36–43).
- « Analyse stylistique d'Éros/Cupidon - Analyse stylistique de l'enfant romain », in Mystère des bronzes antiques, 2003, (p. 28)
- « Des reliefs de la Chancellerie au Montmartre d'Avallon : la politique religieuse de Domitien en Gaule », in Revue archéologique, t.1, 2004, (p. 159–163).
- « Bronzes grecs et romains : recherches récentes », in Revue archéologique, n°2, 2005, (p. 339–364).
- with : Olivier Caumont, Xavier Margarit, Benoît Mille, Paolo Piccardo, « Un bras d'empereur romain en bronze à Essegney (Vosges) », in Revue archéologique de l'Est et du Centre-Est-Dijon, t. 55, 2006, (p. 173–195) (online).
- « Vrai ou faux ? : le cas de la sculpture grecque », in Les Dossiers d'archéologie, Éd. Faton, n°312, 2006, (p. 68–75).
- « Les Civilisés et les Barbares du Ve au IIe, Celtes, Gaulois", Coll. « L'Archéologie face à l'histoire », direction Miklos Szabo, Éd. CAE Européen Mont-Beuvray, [Actes de la table-ronde de Budapest des 17-18 juin 2005], 2006 ISBN 2-909668-48-7
- « Identités ethniques dans le monde grec antique, techniques, le travail, la naissance des styles de l'époque géométrique », in Pallas,63-70, 73, [Actes du Colloque International de Toulouse organisé par le CRATA les 9-11 mars 2006], Presse Universitaire du Mirail, 2007. 275 p. [voir Rolley (1969) & Heilmeyer (1974) pour les chevaux surtout, rapide tableau d'ensemble 1994, (p. 97–101). Rolley BCH 107, 1983, p. 111-132.- BCH 110, 1986, (p. 121–136)].

== Bibliography ==
- Francis Croissant and Stéphane Verger, « Claude Rolley (1933-2007) », in Revue archéologique, 2007, p. 121-128, notes (en ligne).
