= Magny-Lambert =

- Commune
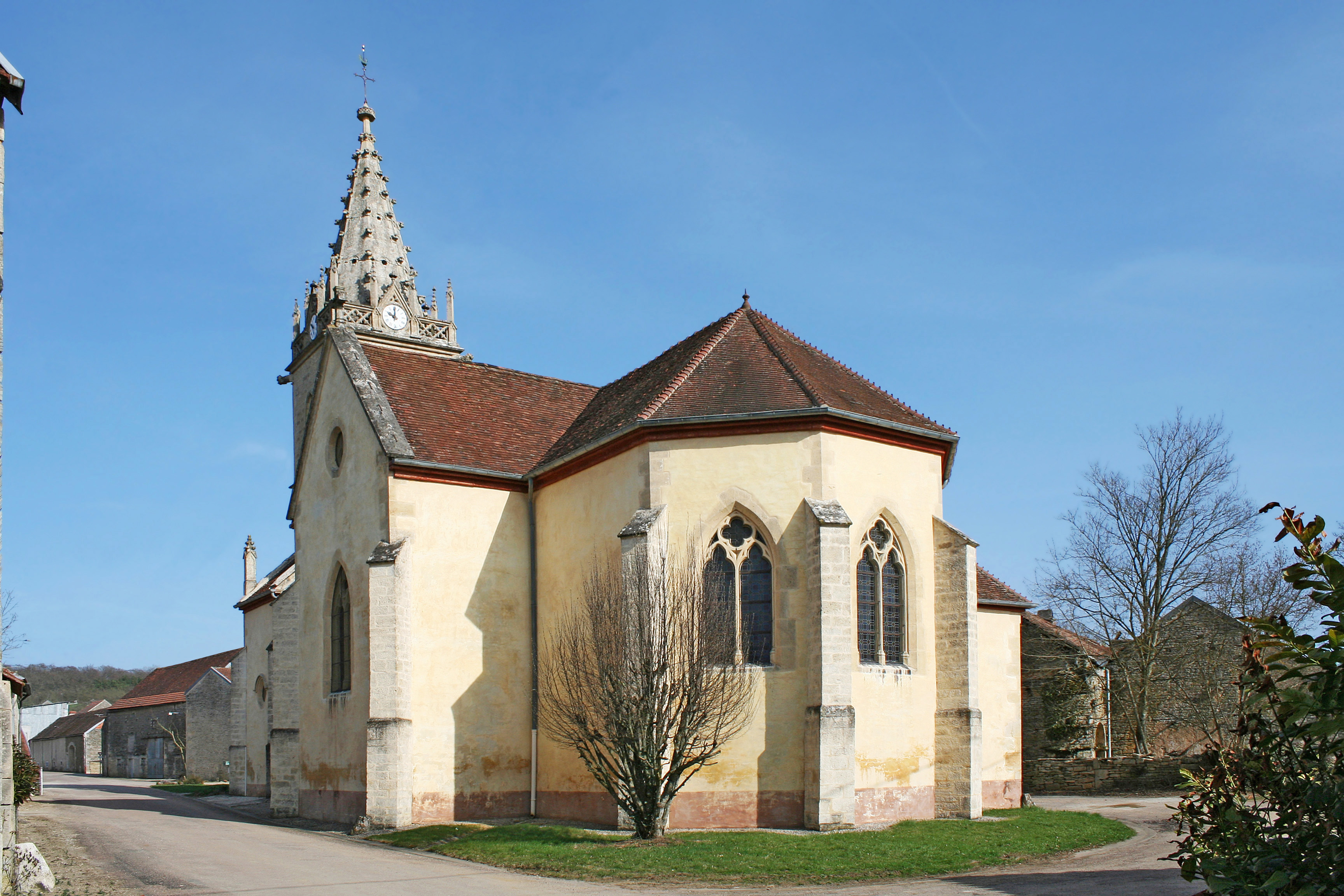
- The church in Magny-Lambert

- Coat of arms
- Location of Magny-Lambert
- Location within France Location within Bourgogne-Franche-Comté
- Coordinates: 47°41′05″N 4°34′46″E
- Country: France
- Region: Bourgogne-Franche-Comté
- Department: Côte-d'Or
- Arrondissement: Montbard
- Canton: Châtillon-sur-Seine
- Intercommunality: Pays Châtillonnais

Government
  - Mayor (2020–2026): Raphaëlle Vautrain
- Area^{1}: 12.78 km^{2} (4.93 sq mi)
- Elevation: 369 m (1,211 ft)
- Highest elevation: 415 m (1,362 ft)
- Lowest elevation: 307 m (1,007 ft)
- Population (2023): 87
  - Density: 6.8/km^{2} (18/sq mi)
- Time zone: UTC+01:00 (CET)
  - Summer (DST): UTC+02:00 (CEST)
- INSEE/Postal code: 21364 /21450
- ^{1} French Land Register data, which excludes lakes, ponds, glaciers > 1 km^{2} (0.386 sq mi or 247 acres) and river estuaries.

Magny-Lambert (French pronunciation: [maɲi lɑ̃bɛʁ]) is a commune in the Côte-d'Or department in eastern France.

== Population ==
Historical population
Year	Pop.	±% p.a.
1968	123	—
1975	108	−1.84%
1982	98	−1.38%
1990	105	+0.87%
1999	105	+0.00%
2007	87	−2.32%
2012	96	+1.99%
2017	86	−2.18%
2023	87	+0.19%
Source: INSEE

== See also ==
- Communes of the Côte-d'Or department
