= Mont Lassois =

Rock formation in Côte-d'Or, France

Coordinates: 47°54′14″N 4°31′52″E

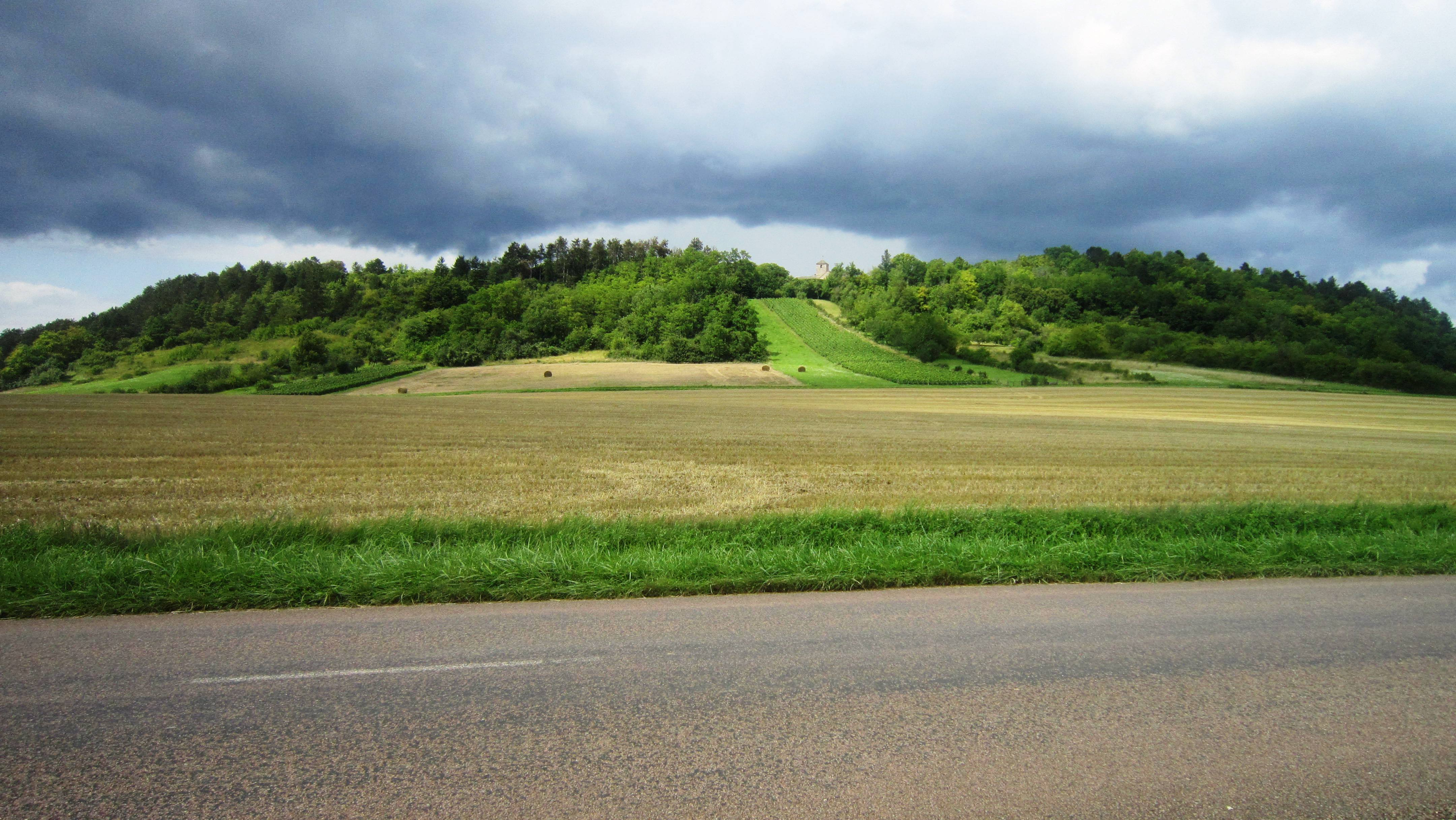
Southeast side of Mont Lassois

Location of Mont Lassois in Bourgogne-Franche-Comté

Mont Lassois is a relevant outlier located in the commune of Vix, near Châtillon-sur-Seine in the north of Côte-d'Or. Dominating the upper Seine valley for approximately 100 m and crowned by a 12th century church, Saint-Marcel of Vix, classified as a historic monument, it is currently the subject of excavations and notable archaeological discoveries concerning the Hallstatt civilization.

== Geography and vegetation ==
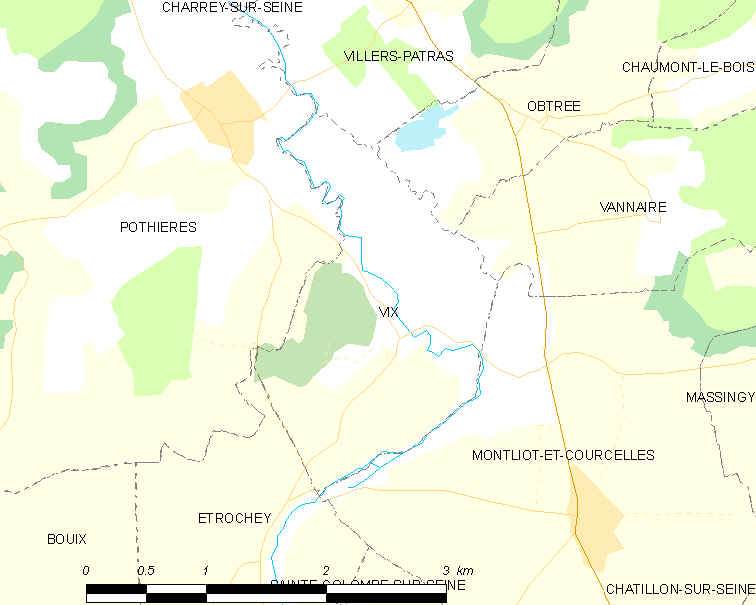

In general Mont Lassois has the shape of a 'J' oriented south–north. The main side, at 306.4 meters from the peak, is known as Mont Saint-Marcel. While the second side, at 280 meters' altitude and oriented east–west, is called Mont Roussillon. Between these two sides there is Saint-Marcel church.

Covered by coppice and forests, Mont Lassois offers in its upper part wide grassy clearings while its lower parts offer cereal and forage crops. Since 1980, wine culture, which was left at the beginning of the 20th century, was re-established on Mont Lassois' slopes: pinot noir and chardonnay grapes for the production of crémant du Châtillonnais.

== History ==
=== Oppidum of the Celtic period ===
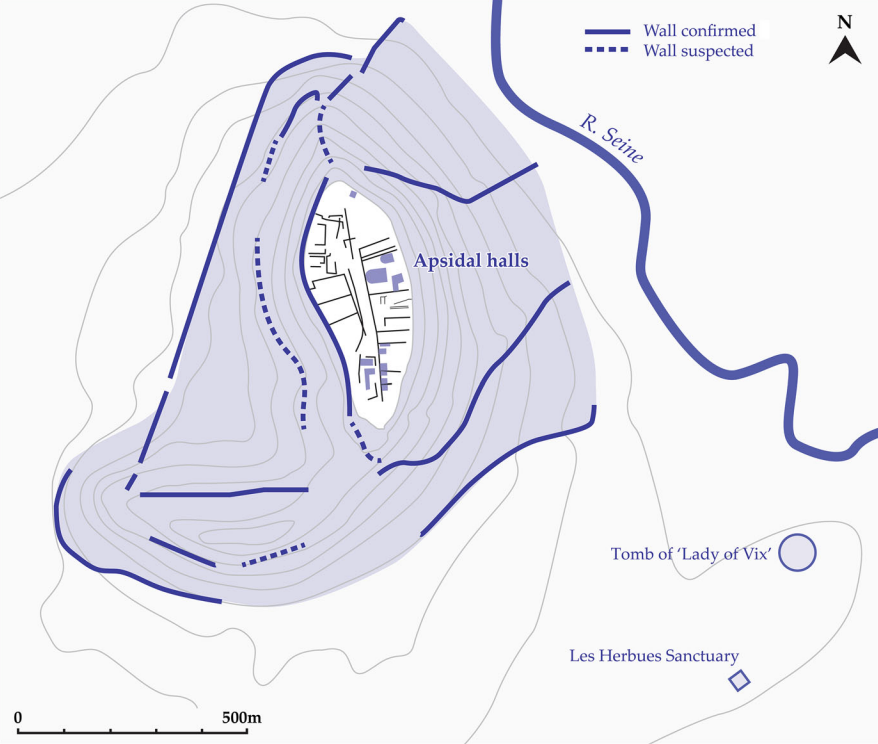
The Celtic oppidum of Mont Lassois (Mussé du Pays Châtillonnais)

Mont Lassois covers the course of the Seine and occupied it since the Neolithic. Also, it worked as an oppidum that seems to have controlled the circulation of tin from Great Britain to Italy at the end of the Hallstatt. The Vix Palace and the fortified city that surrounds it bear witness to this period. The local population, ruled by a female aristocracy in the 6th century BC, took advantage of this situation to tax the passing convoys. The resulting opulence is shown through the richness of the burials built according to the funerary rite of the chariot tomb. Among others, a very rich tumulus at Vix contains the remains of a woman, probably a queen or a priestess, a revealing discovery about the status of women in Celtic society. The function of Mont Lassois then seems to change temporarily to the benefit of the development by the Lingones of Vertillum, which are 20 km away.

=== Late Antiquity and Merovingian period ===
At the end of the Gallo-Roman period the function of the lower part of the oppidum and the surrounding plain by a vicus would be at the origin of the mountain reconquest and the appearance of the city of Latiscum which raises the Hallstatian walls. According to the late story of a monk of Pothières, at the end of the 4th century, the vandals of Crocus, who devastated the cities of the Rhone valley before being defeated in front of Arles, besieged and destroyed the city of Latiscum which was however quickly rebuilt. Latiscum seems to have been Christianized very early on, as evidenced by shards decorated with Christian motifs from Gallo-Roman workshops in Argonne. Around 451, threatened by the Huns, Saint-Loup, bishop of Troyes, took refuge there, and around 519, Saint-Valentin, founder of the abbey of Griselle, was born there. Latiscum lives on and develops during the Early Middle Ages when it becomes a major city as shown by the Merovingian necropolis, found near the summit, and the Merovingian and Carolingian coins, found bearing the mention of Latiscum.

=== Carolingian period ===
During the Carolingian period the settlement moved to Roussillon Mountain, where an oratory was dedicated to Saint Marcel in the 9th century. Latisco appears then under the name of Castellum, a castle in the center of the castrum, a fortified village on a height. In the vulgar language of that time, the word Latisco became Latss. Lassois was then a pagus (a Latin word that means 'country' in English) and an important archdeaconry of the diocese of Langres, which included Bar-sur-Seine and Châtillon, when the Count Palatine Girart de Roussillon, founder of the abbey of Pothières a few kilometers away and of Vézelay, built a castle there. In May 859, a provincial council governed by Rémy, archbishop of Lyon, dismissed him from all his offices, including his fortress of Lassois which was razed to the ground. At that time, Mount Roussillon was home to a small monastery belonging to the abbey of Saint-Marcel-lès-Chalon, which, around 887, ceded it on to Geilon, bishop of Langres.

=== The disappearance ===
A few years later a Norman incursion led to the ruin of the site and the ducal castle of Châtillon became the nerve center of the Lassois, which in 1068 extended north of Bar to Burgundy. In 1111 or 1112, Béatrix, wife of Guy III of Vignory, donated the church of Saint-Marcel to the abbey of Molesme, which erected it as a priory on Mount Roussillon. This priory of Lassois did not survive the Middle Ages: if its prior is still attested in 1227, all occupation of the hillock seems to cease during the 14th century. In the meantime, from 1163, Bar and Châtillon became two deaneries independent of each other.

== Saint-Marcel church ==
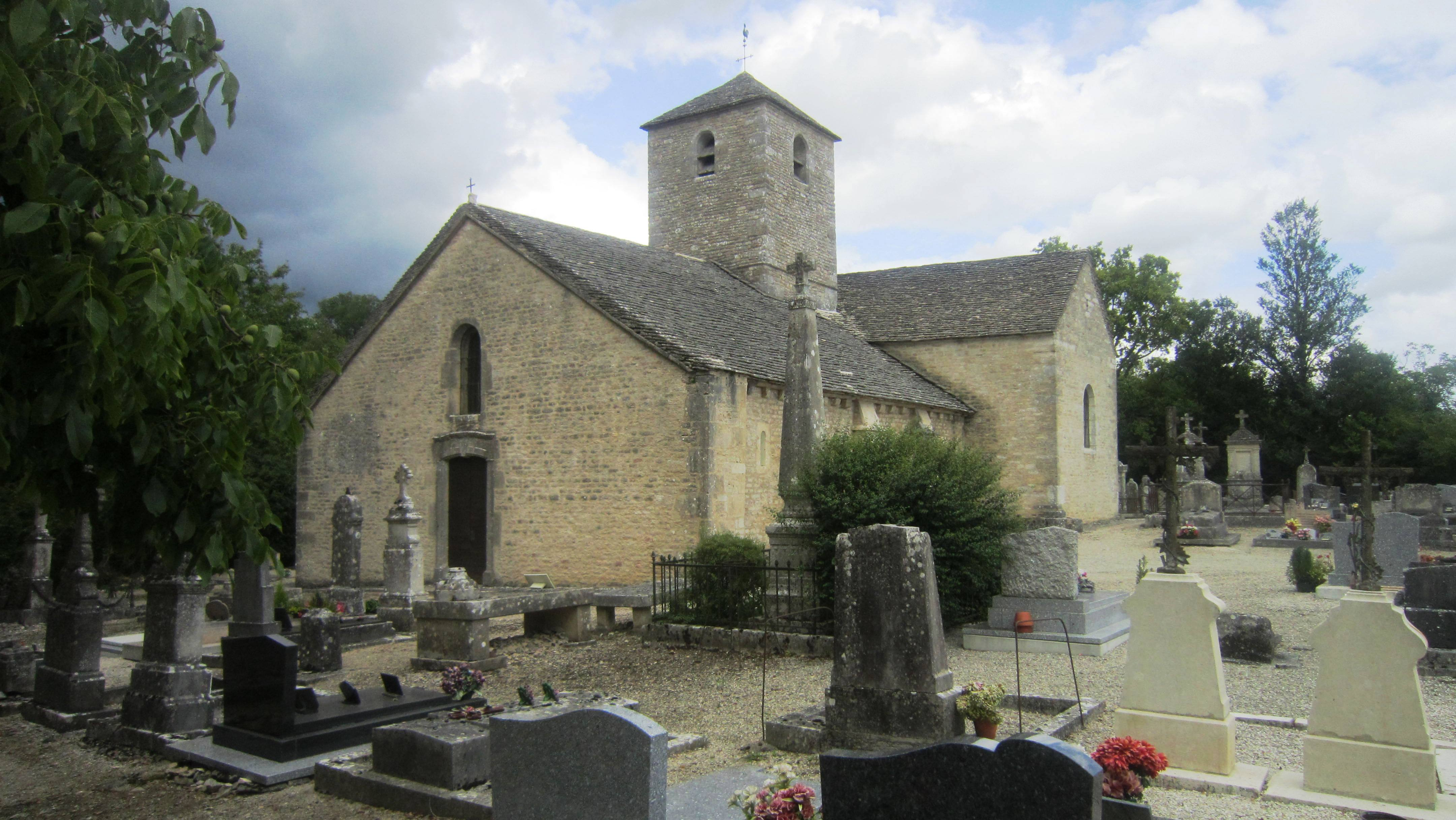
Saint-Marcel church

As early as 887 there is evidence of a Saint-Marcel abbey at the top of the mountain. In the 11th century, a Romanesque church, serving the neighboring communes, was built under the summit plateau at the place called Roussillon Mountain. The walls were partly built with reused sarcophagi from a nearby Merovingian cemetery and one of these is on display in the church. It may have been the successor to the chapel of the lost 9th century castle.

The square bell tower, which dates from the 15th century, like the pentagonal choir, contains a bell cast in 1824 and sponsored by Marshal Marmont. Saint-Marcel, Classé MH in 1914 (classified as a historical monument), is an evidence of an excellent state of preservation of the first stone constructions on the borders of northern Burgundy and Champagne. Surrounded by its cemetery, it is currently accessible by a rather narrow and steeply sloping road from Vix.

== Archaeological excavations ==
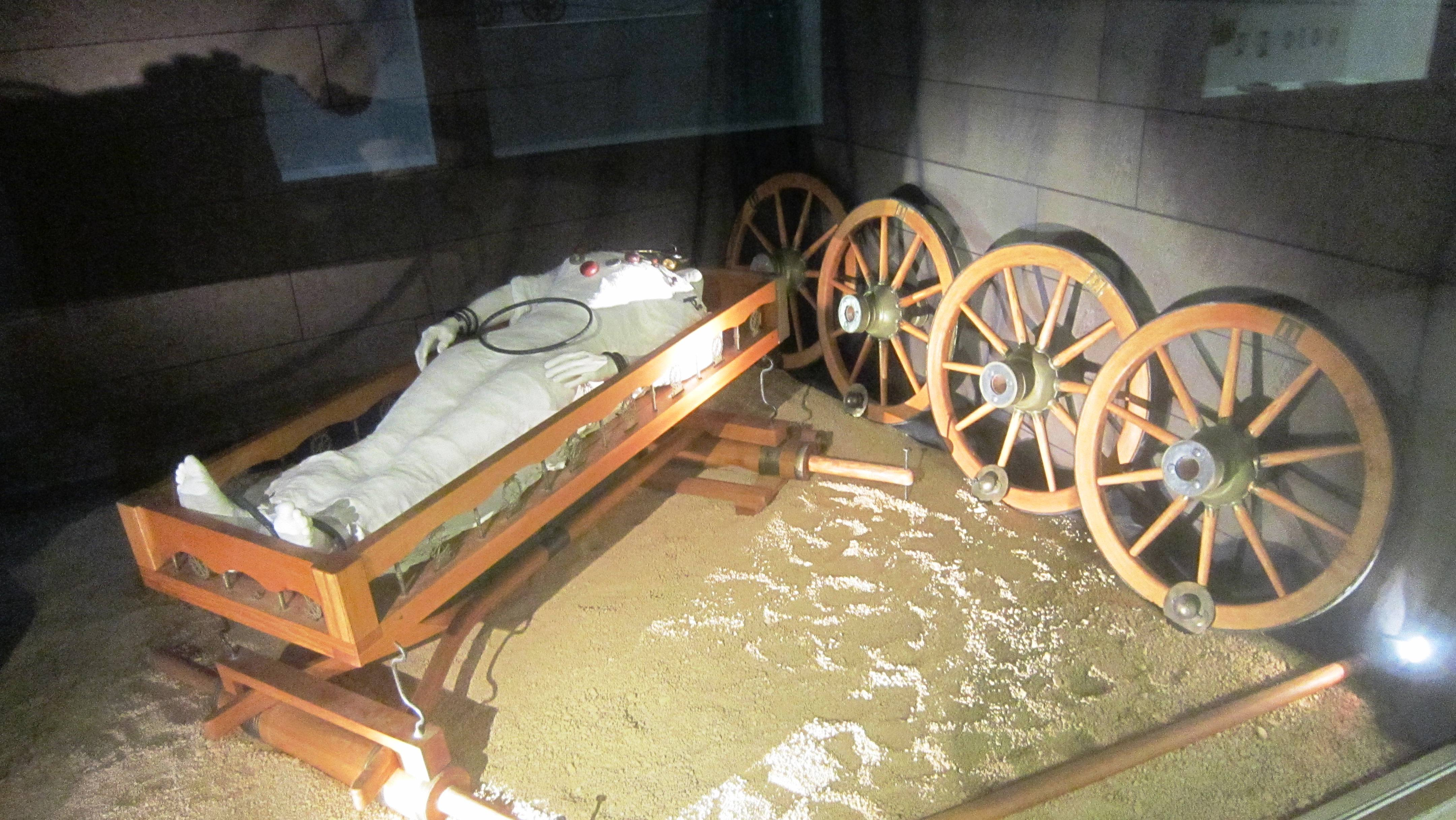
Reconstruction of the tomb of Vix (Musée du Pays Châtillonnais)

The hiatus of occupation between the end of the Hallstatt and the Gallo-Roman period leaves the traces of the Celtic civilization more accessible to excavation than in other places where these two historical levels followed each other directly.

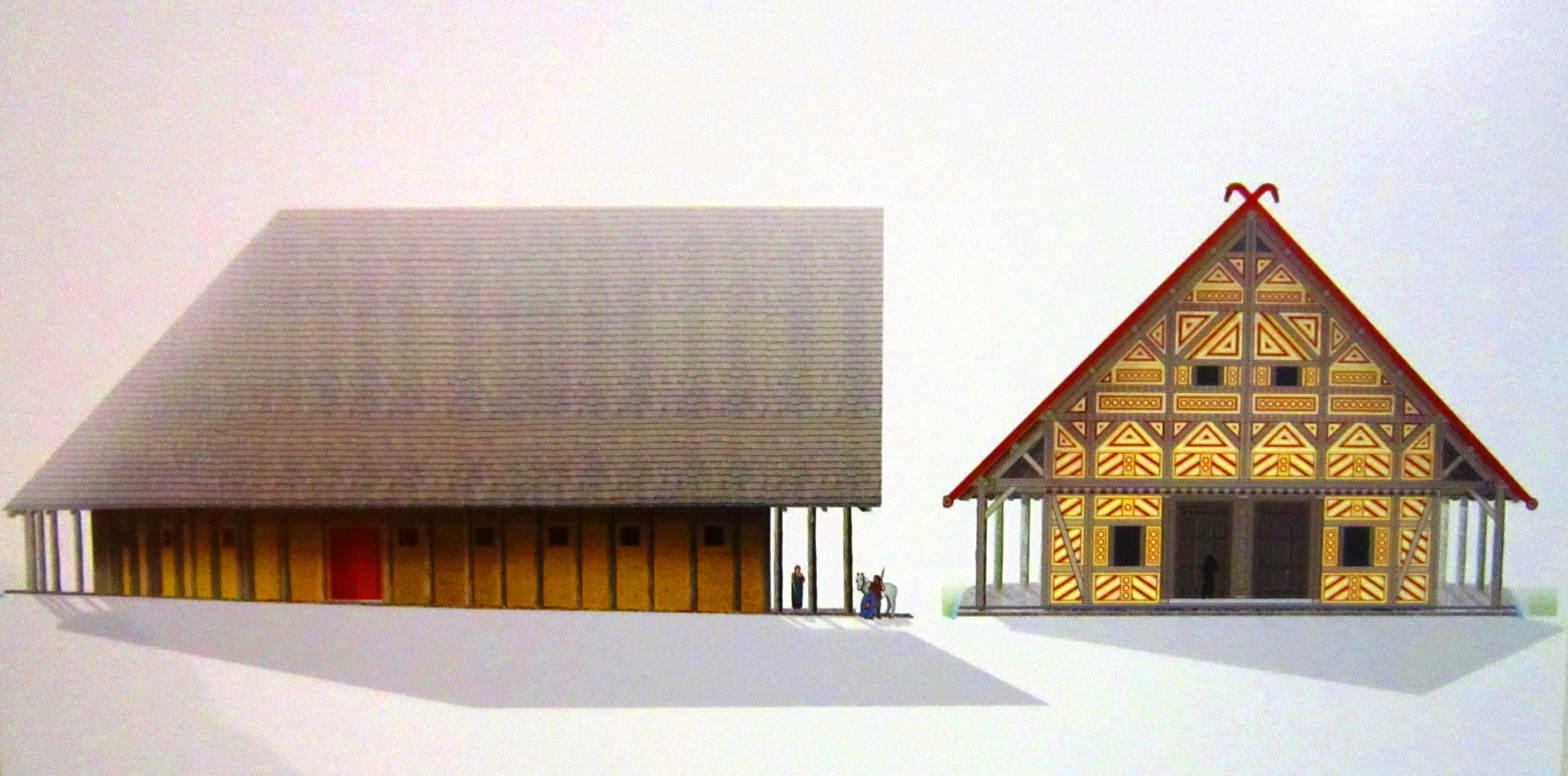
Reconstruction of part of the "palace" (Musée du Pays Châtillonnais)

As early as the 19th century, protohistoric tank tombs were discovered not far from there in Sainte-Colombe-sur-Seine. One of them yielded a large bronze lebes of Etruscan or Anatolian origin which are preserved in the Musée du Pays Châtillonnais, and another a set of gold jewelry, bracelets and earrings, preserved in the National Archaeological Museum in Saint-Germain-en-Laye. From 1930 onwards, excavations of the middle and lower parts of the mountain by Jean Lagorgette, assisted by Maurice Moisson, allowed the collection of Gallo-Roman material. These excavations were resumed after the war. In January 1953, in a loop of the Seine at the foot of the mount, the discovery of the vase and the princely tomb of Vix by Maurice Moisson and René Joffroy renewed interest in the archaeological potential of the site.

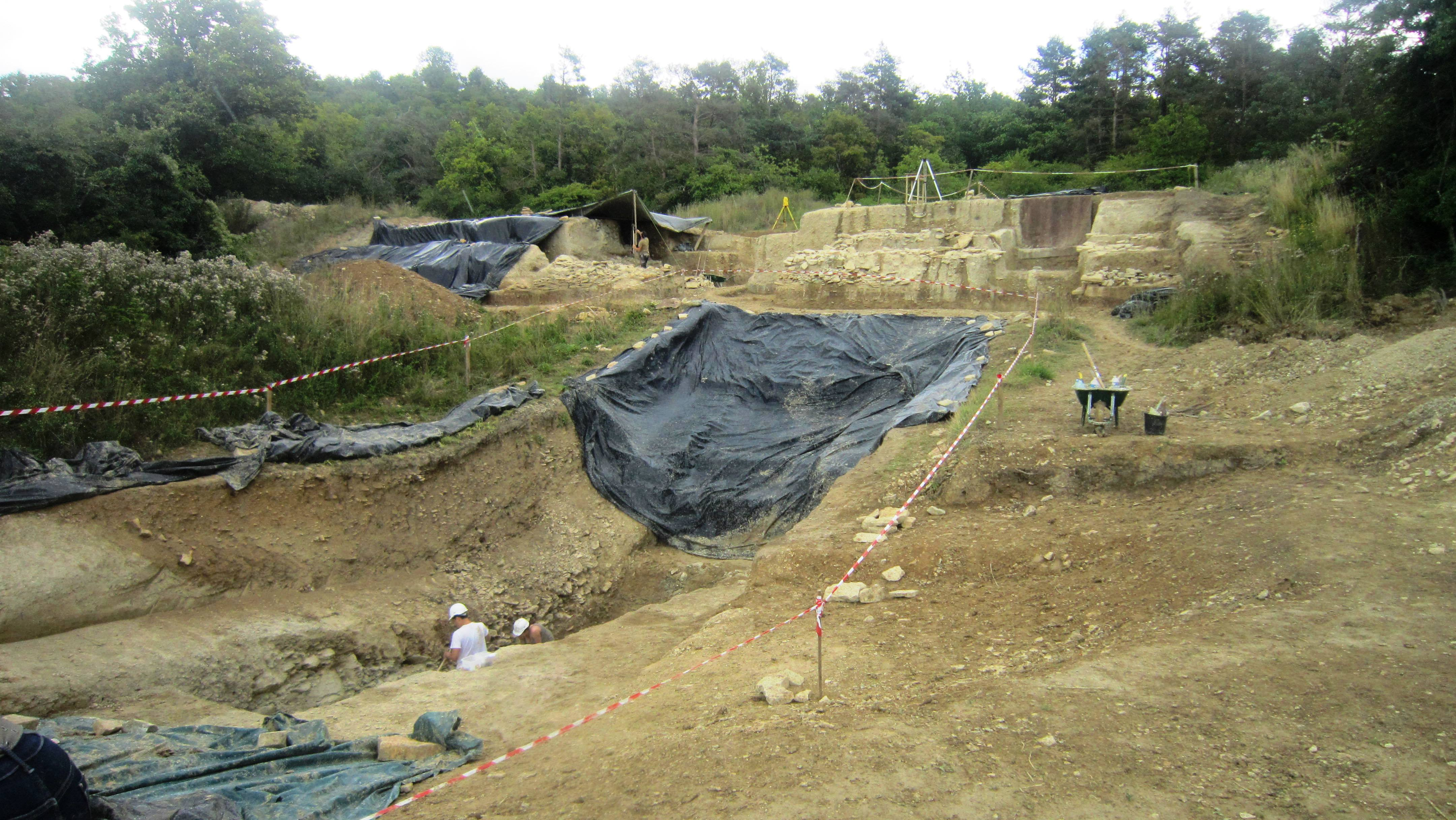
The excavations in 2014 at the western gate of the rampart.

From 2002 onwards, new excavations on the summit plateau of the oppidum led to the discovery of the remains of the Vix Palace, a very large building situated in a complex of buildings similar to a city, a new phenomenon at that time in the Celtic world. These excavations, carried out each summer by archaeological teams from Germany (Kiel University and University of Stuttgart), Austria (University of Vienna), France (University of Burgundy) and Switzerland (University of Zurich), coordinated by Bruno Chaume, have revealed an imposing peripheral rampart surrounding the base of the mountain and opening up to the north towards the bed of the Seine, as well as a probable farm on the plain, close to the site of the discovery of the Vix crater and a sanctuary that had already been identified and excavated.

== See also ==
- Musée du Pays Châtillonnais
- Hallstatt culture
- Lingones

== Bibliography ==
- d'Arbois de Jubainville, Henri (1858). Note sur les deux Barrois, sur le pays de Laçois et sur l'ancien Bassigny (in French). Paris: Bibliothèque de l'École des chartes.
- Brun, Patrice; Chaume, Bruno (1997). "Vix et les éphémères principautés celtiques. Les vie – ve siècles avant J.-C.". Europe centre-occidentale (in French). Errance. ISBN 2-907303-47-3.
- Chaume, Bruno (2001). Vix et son territoire à l'Age du Fer, avec Claude Rolley & Claude Mordant : fouilles de l'Oppidum du Mont Lassois (in French). Montagnac: Monique Mergoil. ISBN 2-907303-47-3.
- Chaume, Bruno (2004). Vix, le mont Lassois. Recherches récentes sur le complexe aristocratique in Dossiers d'Archéologie no 11 Hors Série (in French). Dijon: Université de Dijon. ISSN 1141-7137.
- Chaume, Bruno (2011). Le complexe aristocratique de Vix. Nouvelles recherches sur l'habitat, le système de fortification et l'environnement du mont Lassois, avec Claude Mordant (in French). Dijon: Presses universitaires de Dijon. ISBN 978-2-915611-47-2.
- Chaume, Bruno (2016). Bruno Chaume et Félicie Fougère (directrice d'ouvrage), La Tombe de Vix : Un trésor celte entre histoire et légende (in French). Fage éditions - DRAC Bourgogne-Franche-Comté. ISBN 978-2-84975-407-8.
- Deyts, Simone; Coudrot, Jean-Louis (2003). Vix, le cinquantenaire d'une découverte in Dossiers d'Archéologie (in French). Dijon: Faton. ISSN 1141-7137.
- Joffroy, René (1954). Das Oppidum Mont Lassois, Gemeinde Vix, Dép Côte-d'Or in Germania (in French).
- Joffroy, René (1960). L'Oppidum de Vix et la civilisation Hallstattienne finale dans l'Est de la France (in French). Dijon: Université de Dijon. OCLC 468786999.
- Olivier, Laurent (2012). Nos ancêtres les Germains : Les archéologues au service du nazisme (in French). Preface by Jérôme Prieur. Paris: Tallandier. ISBN 978-2-84734-960-3.BnF 42738797
- Rolley, Claude; Chaume, Bruno; Mordant, Claude (2001). Vix et son territoire à l'Age du Fer, avec : Fouilles de l'Oppidum du Mont Lassois (in French). Montagnac: Vix et son territoire à l'Age du Fer, avec : Fouilles de l'Oppidum du Mont Lassois. ISBN 2-907303-47-3.
- Rolley, Claude (2001). Vix et son territoire à l'Age du Fer, avec : Fouilles de l'Oppidum du Mont Lassois (in French). Montagnac: Monique Mergoil. ISBN 2-907303-47-3.
- Rolley, Claude (2003). La Tombe princière de Vix : Album (in French). Paris: Picard. ISBN 2-7084-0697-3.
