= Vitruvian scroll =

Scroll pattern used in architectural decoration

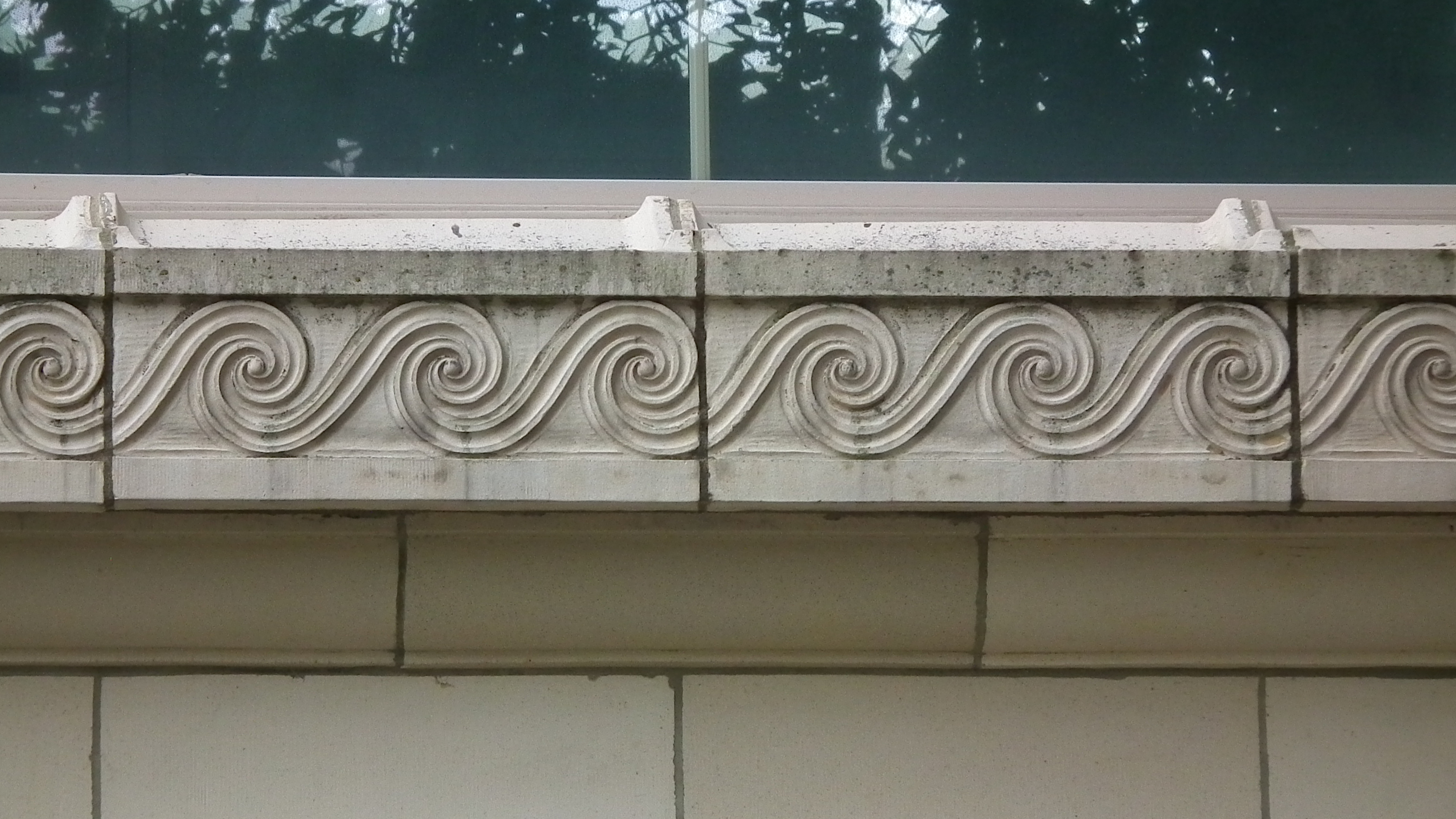
Vitruvian scroll pattern

The Vitruvian scroll is a scroll pattern used in architectural moldings and borders in other media. It is also known as the Vitruvian wave, wave scroll, or running dog pattern. The pattern resembles waves in water or a series of parchment scrolls viewed on end.

"Vitruvian" refers to the Roman architect Marcus Vitruvius Pollio ("Vitruvius"), who wrote the oldest extant book on architecture, which describes some of the classical architectural orders.

== Gallery ==
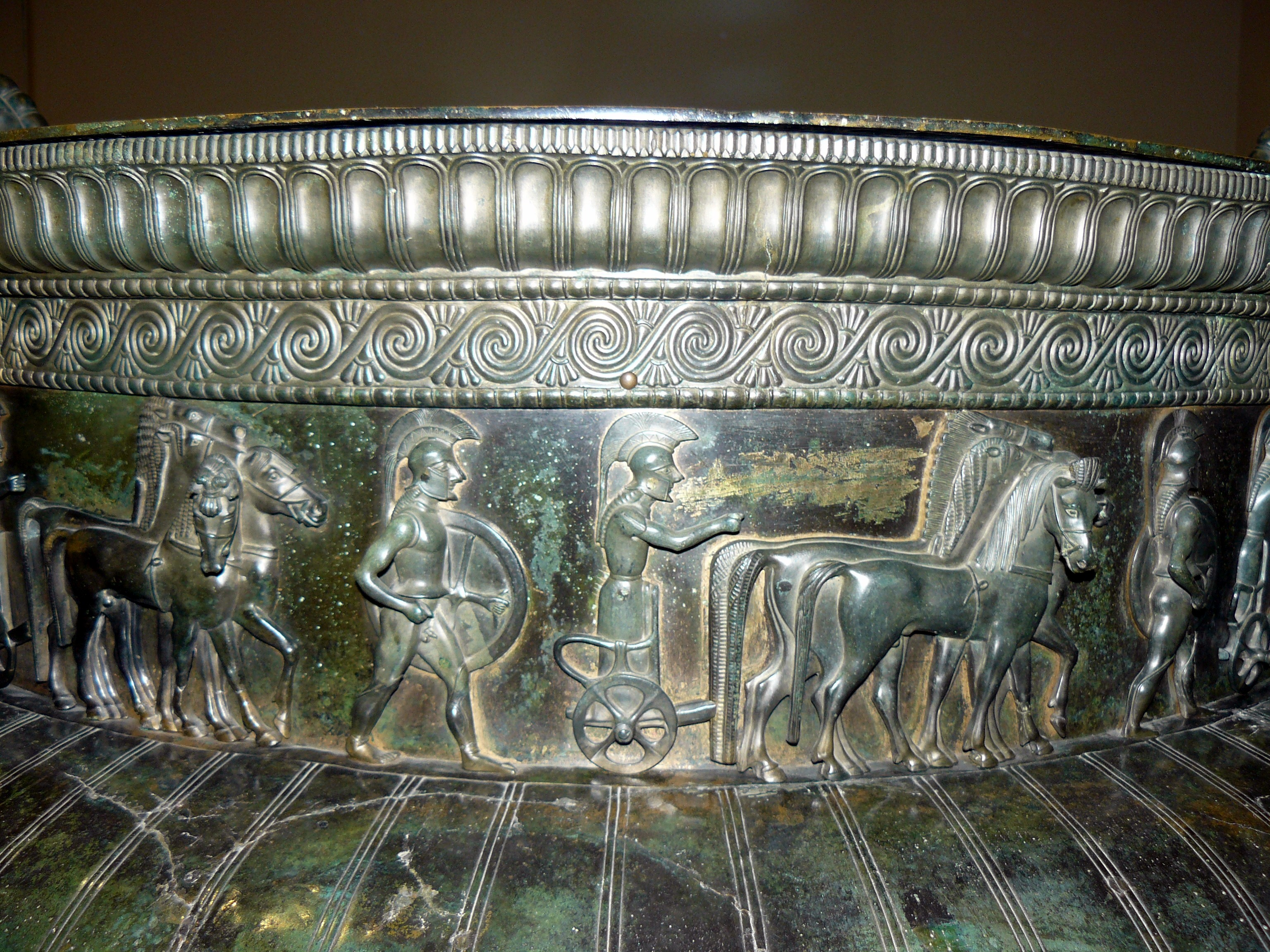
Ancient Greek Vitruvian scrolls under the lip of the Vix Krater, c.530 BC, bronze, Musée du Pays Châtillonnais, Châtillon-sur-Seine, France

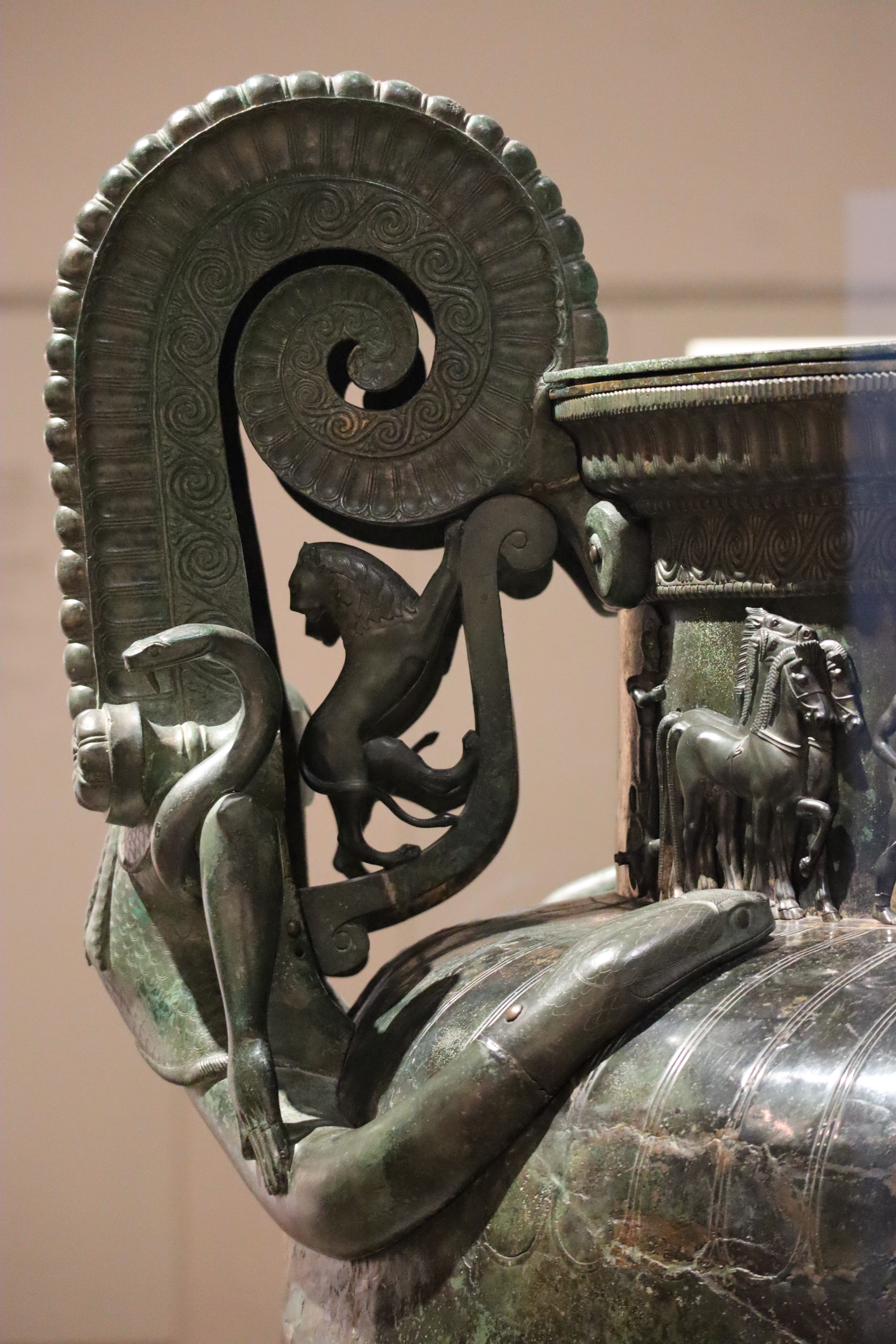
Ancient Greek Vitruvian scrolls on the handle of the Vix Krater

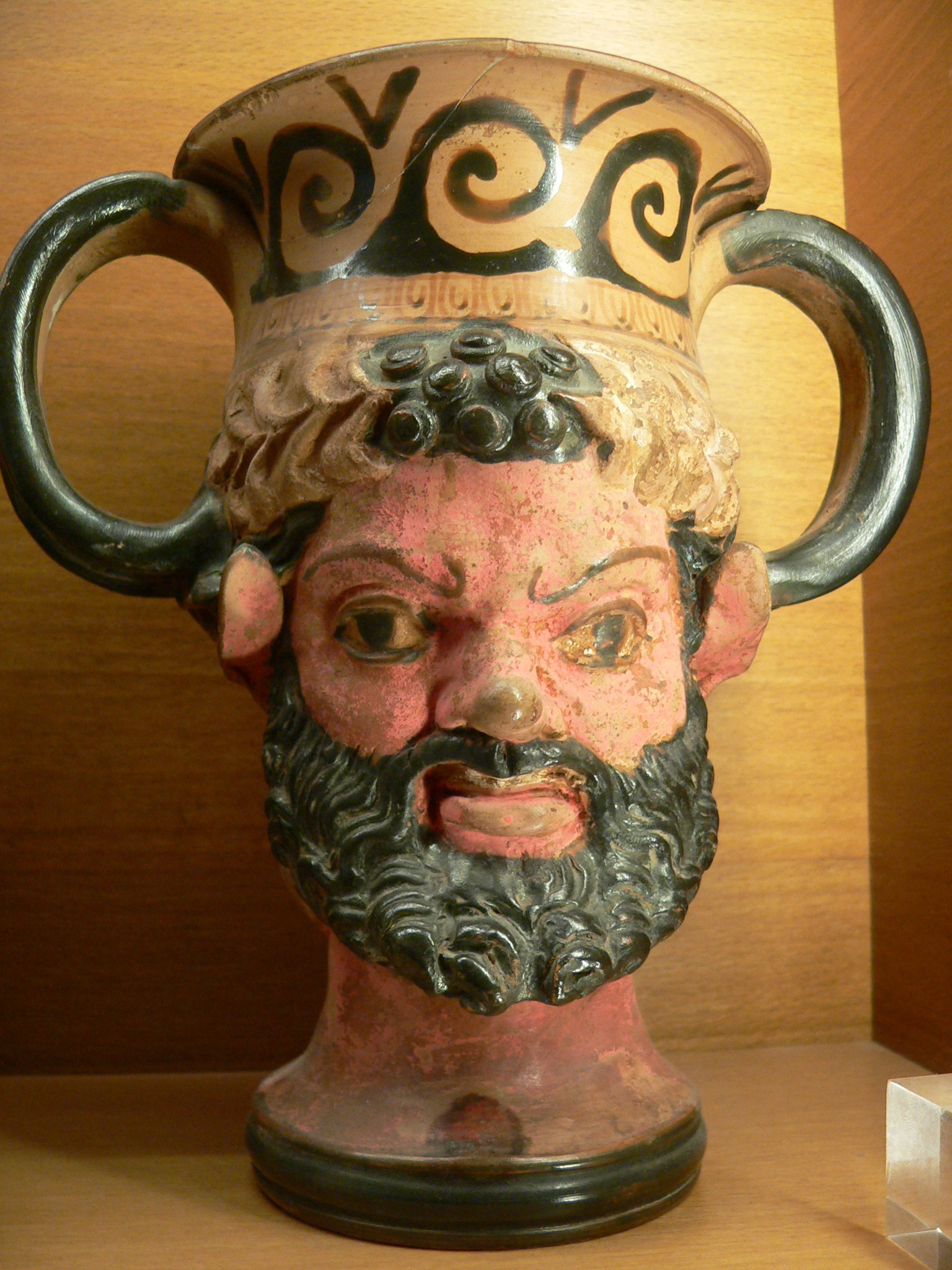
Etruscan Vitruvian scrolls at the top of a kantharos, 2nd half of the 4th century BC, terracotta, Louvre

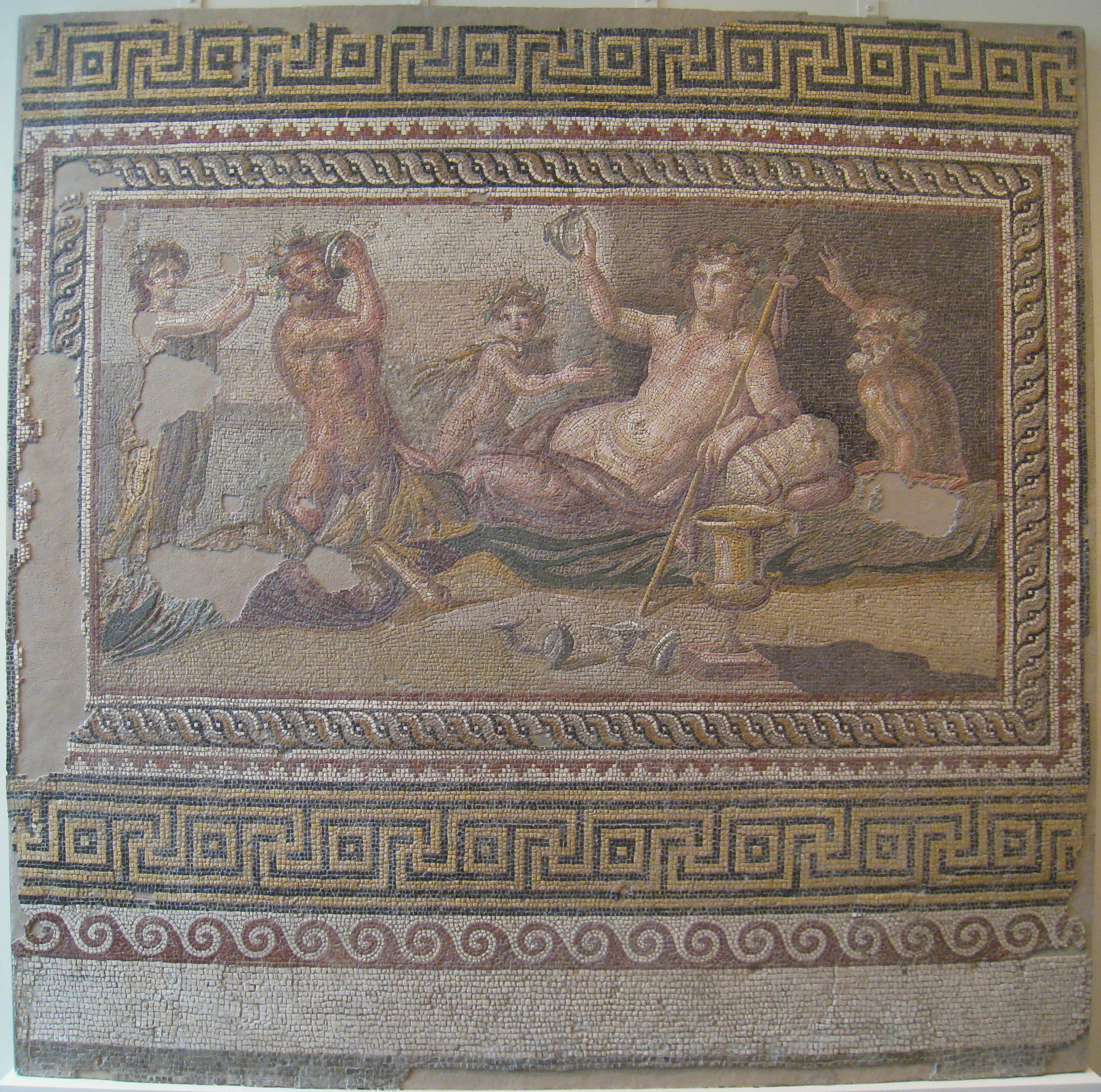
Roman Vitruvian scrolls on a mosaic (only the bottom border survived), 2nd-4th centuries, mosaic, Worcester Art Museum, Worcester, Massachusetts, US

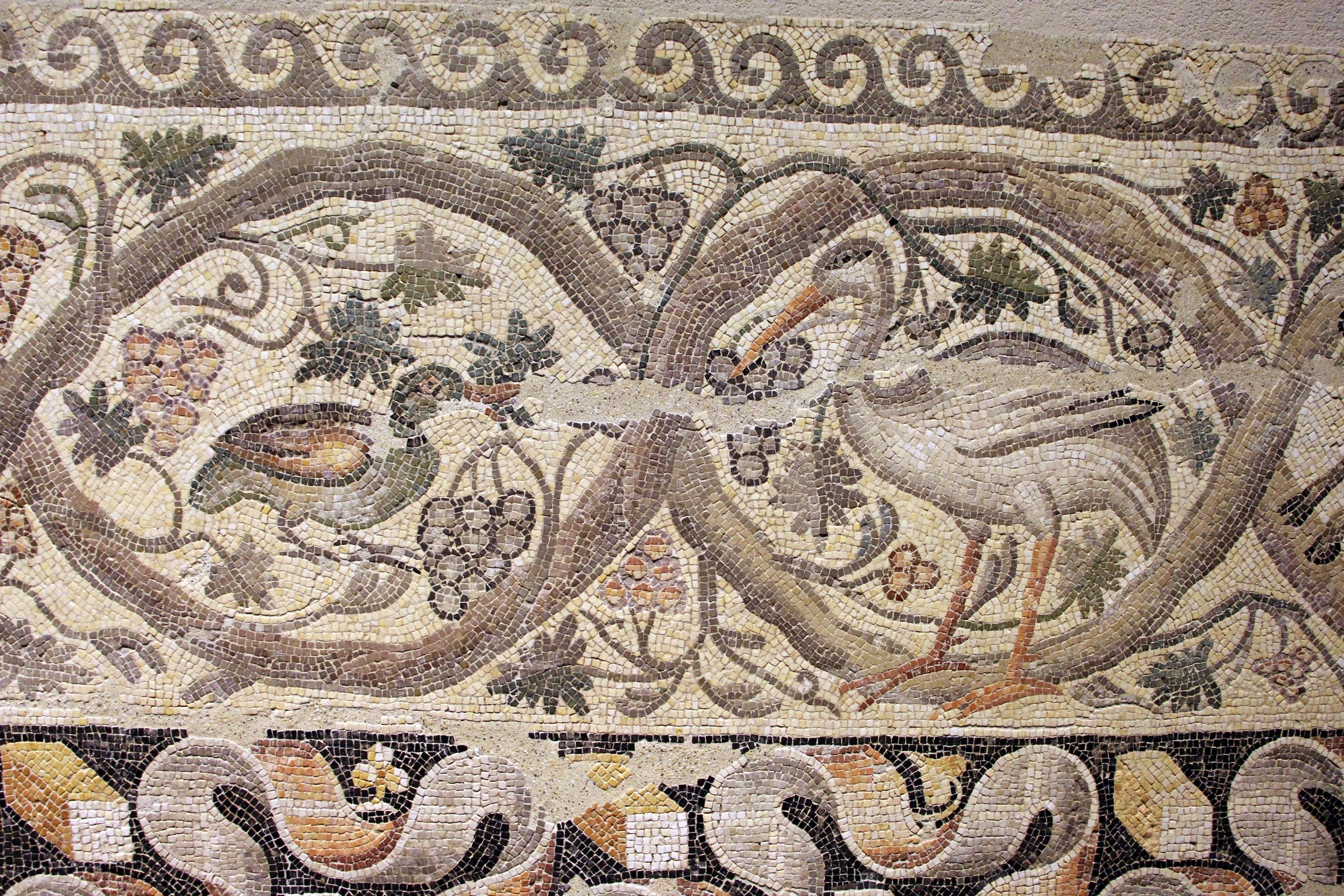
Roman Vitruvian scrolls on a mosaic with animals, 4th century AD, mosaic, Louvre

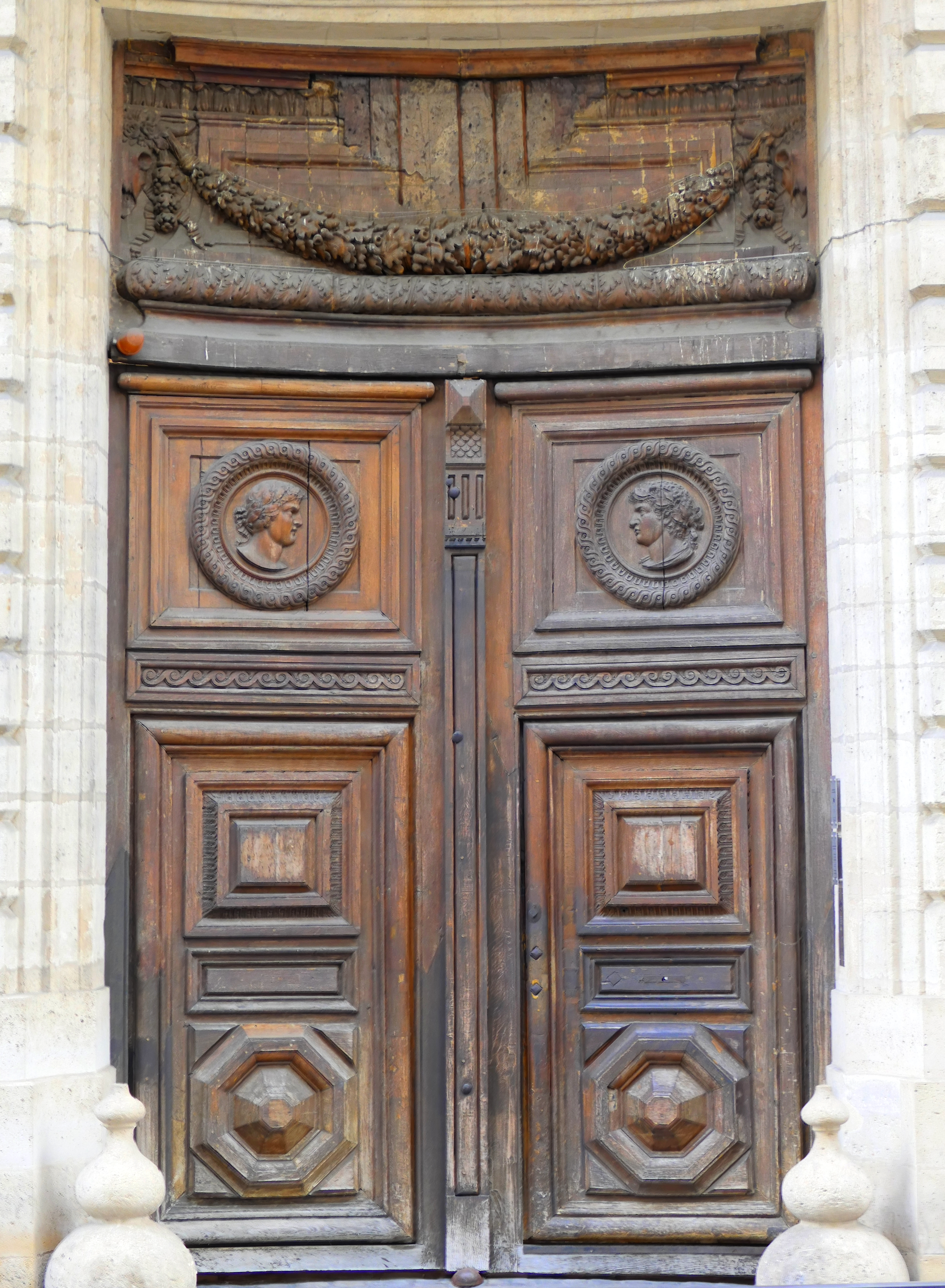
Baroque door with Vitruvian scrolls friezes of the Hôtel de Beauvais, Paris, by Antoine Lepautre, 1657-1660

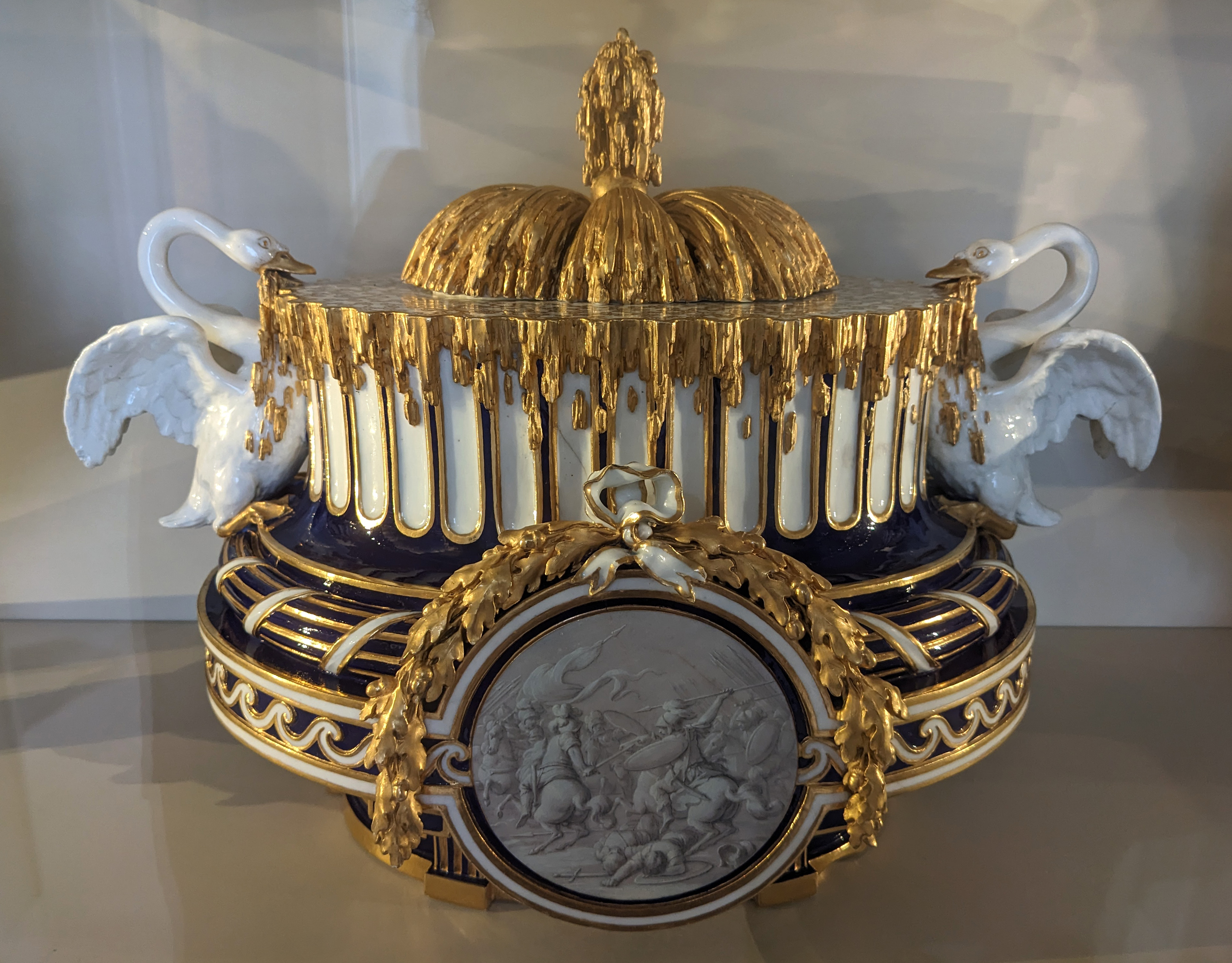
Louis XVI style vase with a medallion, swans and Vitruvian scrolls, by Jean-Baptiste-Étienne Genest and the Sèvres Porcelain Manufactory, designed in 1766, produced in c.1767, soft-paste porcelain, Louvre

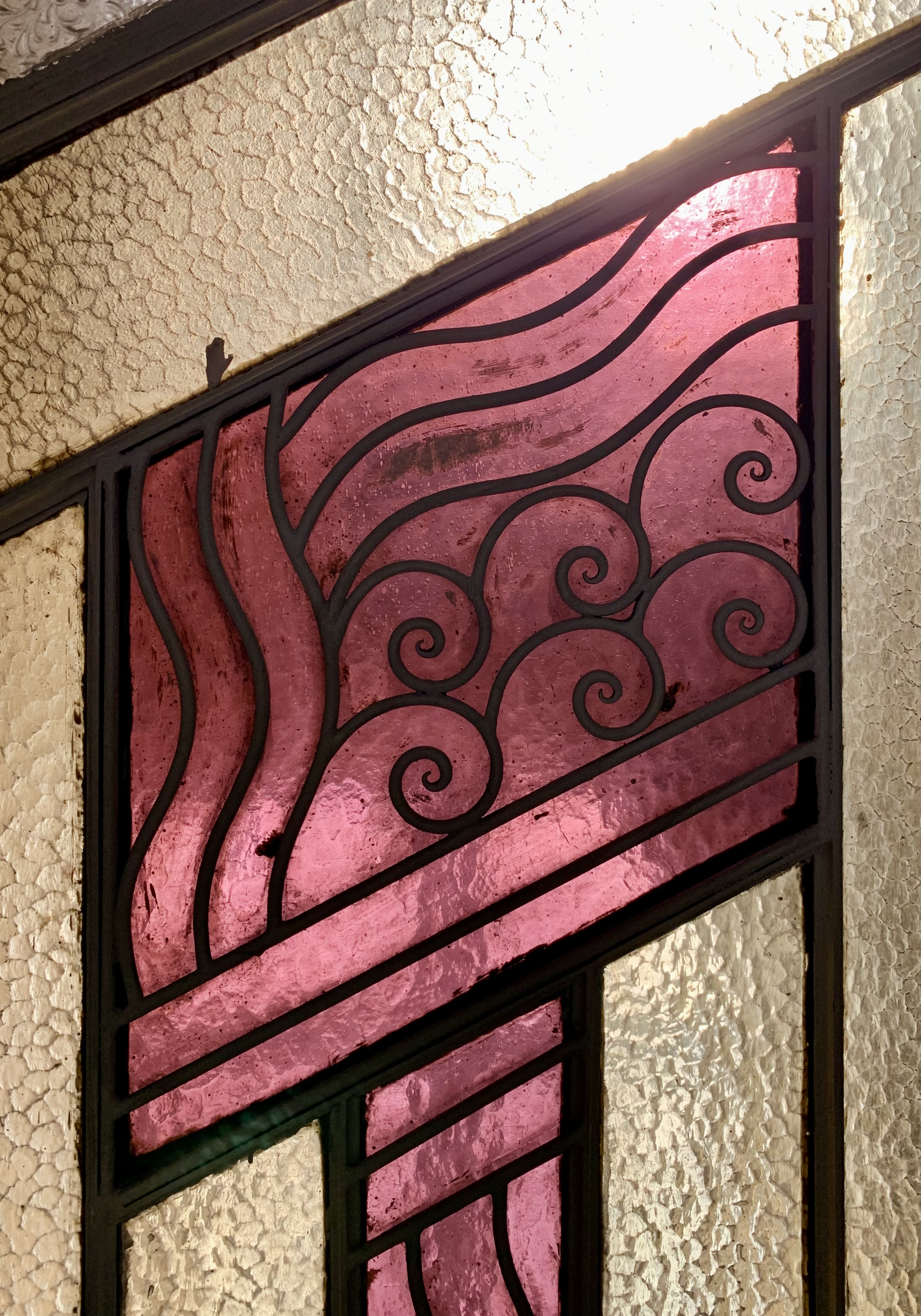
Art Deco window grill with stylized Vitruvian scrolls in Bulevardul Hristo Botev no. 26, Bucharest, Romania, unknown architect, c.1930

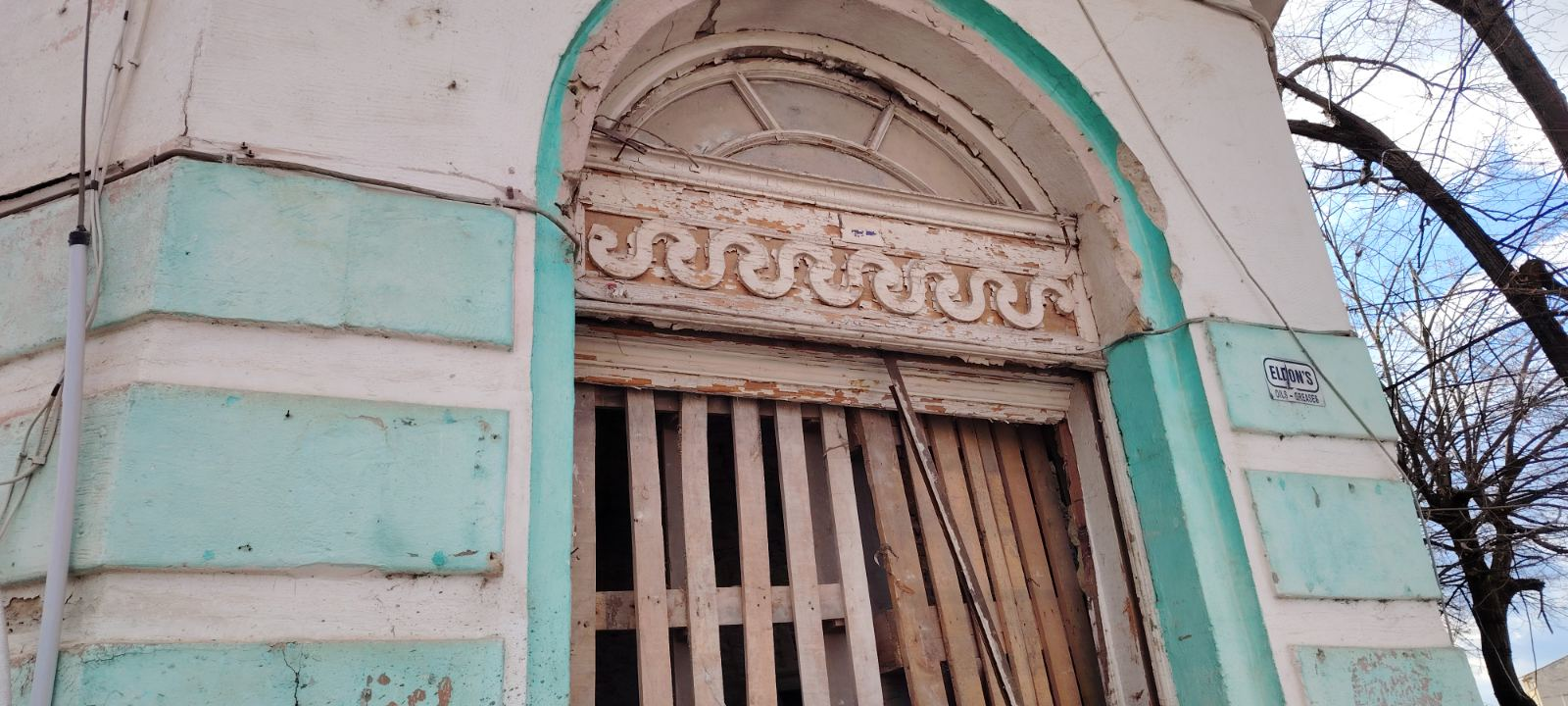
Vitruvian scroll on a building of a typical style for the late 19th to early 20th-century eclectic architecture on the Balkans, combining neoclassical influences such as the Vitruvian scroll patterns often seen in classical art and architecture. Built in Popovo, Bulgaria, c. 1925

== See also ==
- Meander (art)
