= Sainte-Colombe-sur-Seine =

- Commune
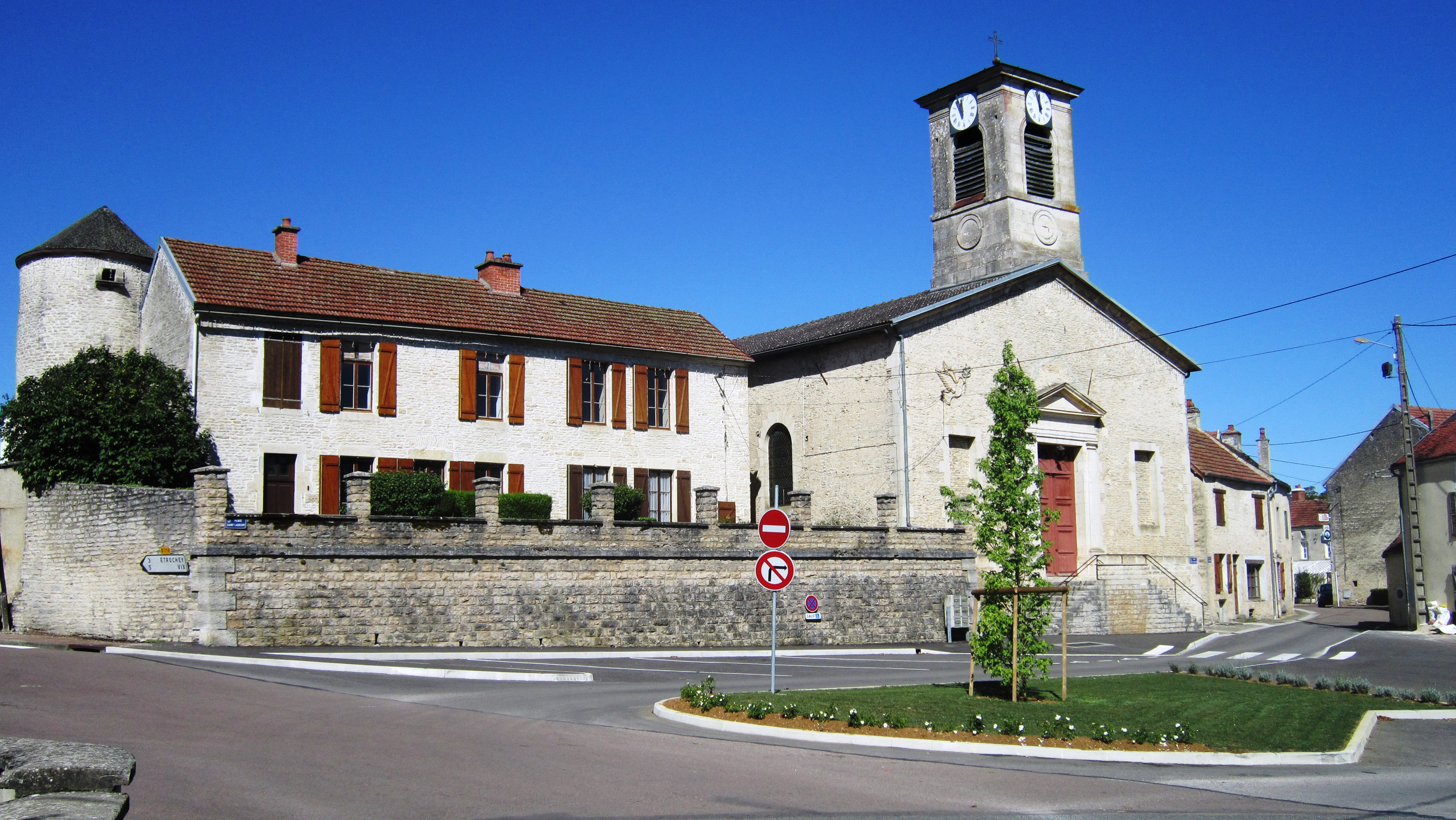
- The church in Sainte-Colombe-sur-Seine

- Coat of arms
- Location of Sainte-Colombe-sur-Seine
- Location within France Location within Bourgogne-Franche-Comté
- Coordinates: 47°52′21″N 4°32′31″E
- Country: France
- Region: Bourgogne-Franche-Comté
- Department: Côte-d'Or
- Arrondissement: Montbard
- Canton: Châtillon-sur-Seine
- Intercommunality: Pays Châtillonnais

Government
  - Mayor (2020–2026): Cyril Mayer
- Area^{1}: 16.16 km^{2} (6.24 sq mi)
- Elevation: 215 m (705 ft)
- Highest elevation: 283 m (928 ft)
- Lowest elevation: 206 m (676 ft)
- Population (2023): 918
  - Density: 56.8/km^{2} (147/sq mi)
- Time zone: UTC+01:00 (CET)
  - Summer (DST): UTC+02:00 (CEST)
- INSEE/Postal code: 21545 /21400
- ^{1} French Land Register data, which excludes lakes, ponds, glaciers > 1 km^{2} (0.386 sq mi or 247 acres) and river estuaries.

Sainte-Colombe-sur-Seine (French pronunciation: [sɛ̃t kɔlɔ̃b syʁ sɛn], literally Sainte-Colombe on Seine) is a commune in the Côte-d'Or department in eastern France.

== Population ==
Historical population
| Year | Pop. | ±% p.a. |
|---|---|---|
| 1968 | 1,230 | — |
| 1975 | 1,330 | +1.12% |
| 1982 | 1,201 | −1.45% |
| 1990 | 1,151 | −0.53% |
| 1999 | 1,042 | −1.10% |
| 2007 | 912 | −1.65% |
| 2012 | 968 | +1.20% |
| 2017 | 943 | −0.52% |
| 2023 | 918 | −0.45% |
Source: INSEE

== Iron Age and Antiquity ==
Located not far from the site of the Vix grave, Sainte-Colombe is on a very rich archaeological territory. In the 19th century, several Hallstatt-era burial mounds containing wagon burials were excavated at the request of Napoleon III. The first, located at a place called La Garenne, provided in 1846 a magnificent bronze lebes of Etruscan origin, now displayed in the Musée du Pays Châtillonnais in Châtillon-sur-Seine. In another, at La Butte, gold bracelets and earrings were discovered in the grave of a woman laid to rest on an iron-clad funerary wagon. These gold items are now kept at the National Archeological Museum in Saint-Germain-en-Laye.

In the middle of the twentieth century René Joffroy (1958) postulated that the elites buried under the tumulus of La Butte and La Garenne had Mont Lassois as their place of residence. However geomagnetic surveys carried out in 2015 revealed the presence of several large buildings in the vicinity of the Sainte-Colombe burial mounds, suggesting that they may have also lived nearby.

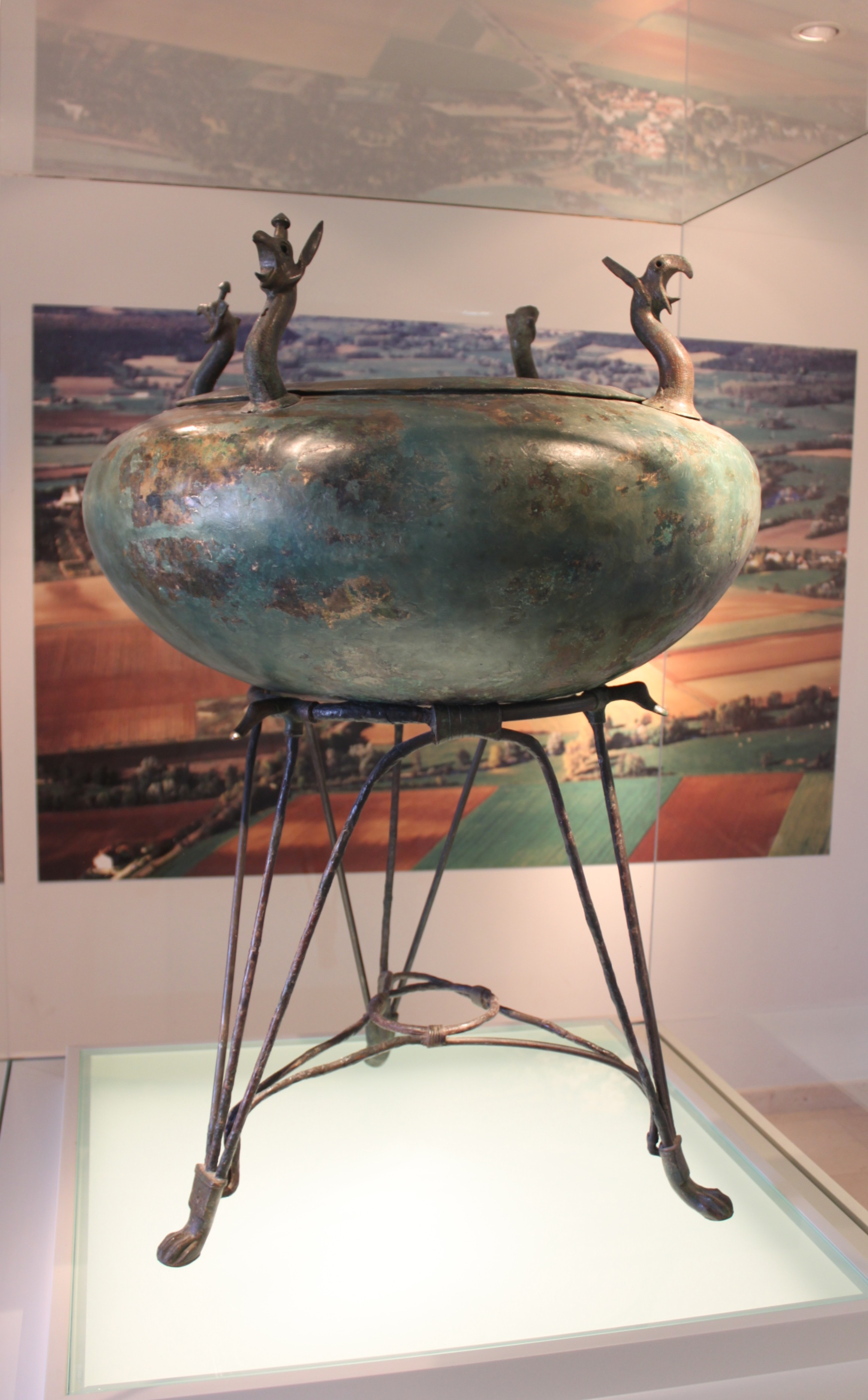
Etruscan lebes cauldron

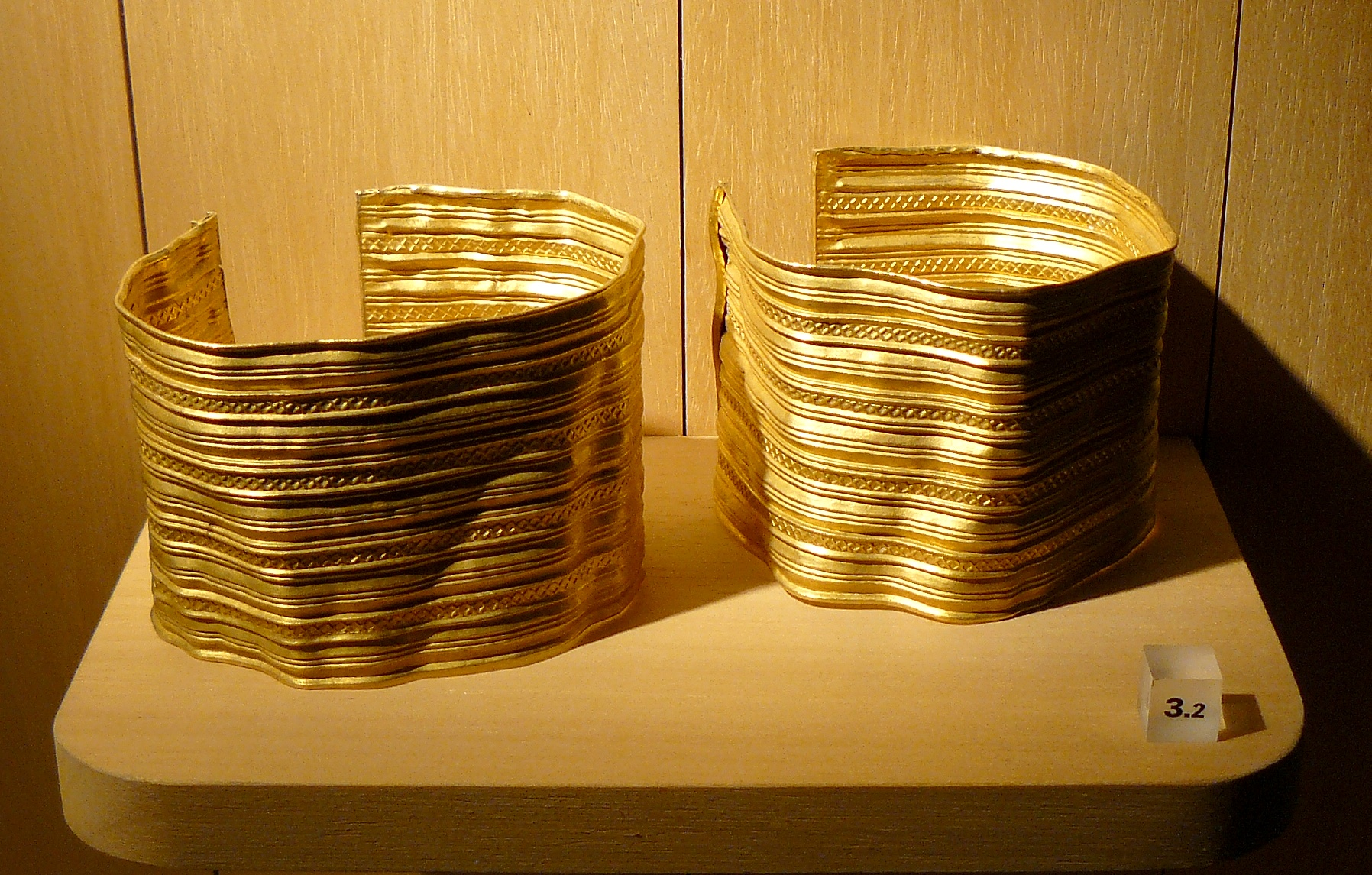
Gold bracelets, 6th century BC

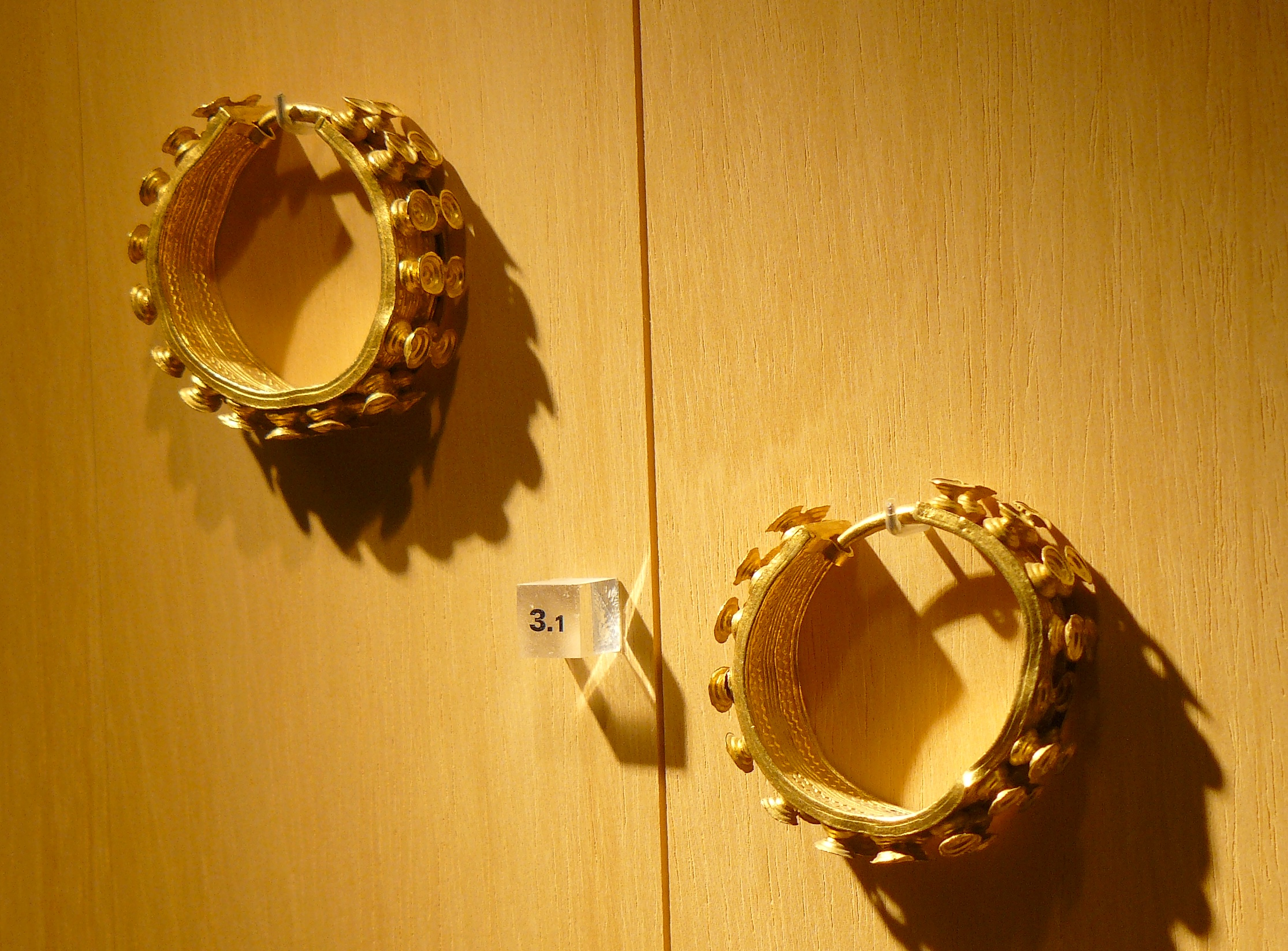
Gold earrings, 6th century BC

The remains of several Gallo-Roman villas were discovered in 1851. Part of a mortuary column representing Venus and a sculpture of a draped woman discovered in 1867 are now kept in the Musée du pays Châtillonnais.

== See also ==
- Communes of the Côte-d'Or department
- Vix Grave
- Lavau, Aube
