= Balot, Côte-d'Or =

Balot
- Commune
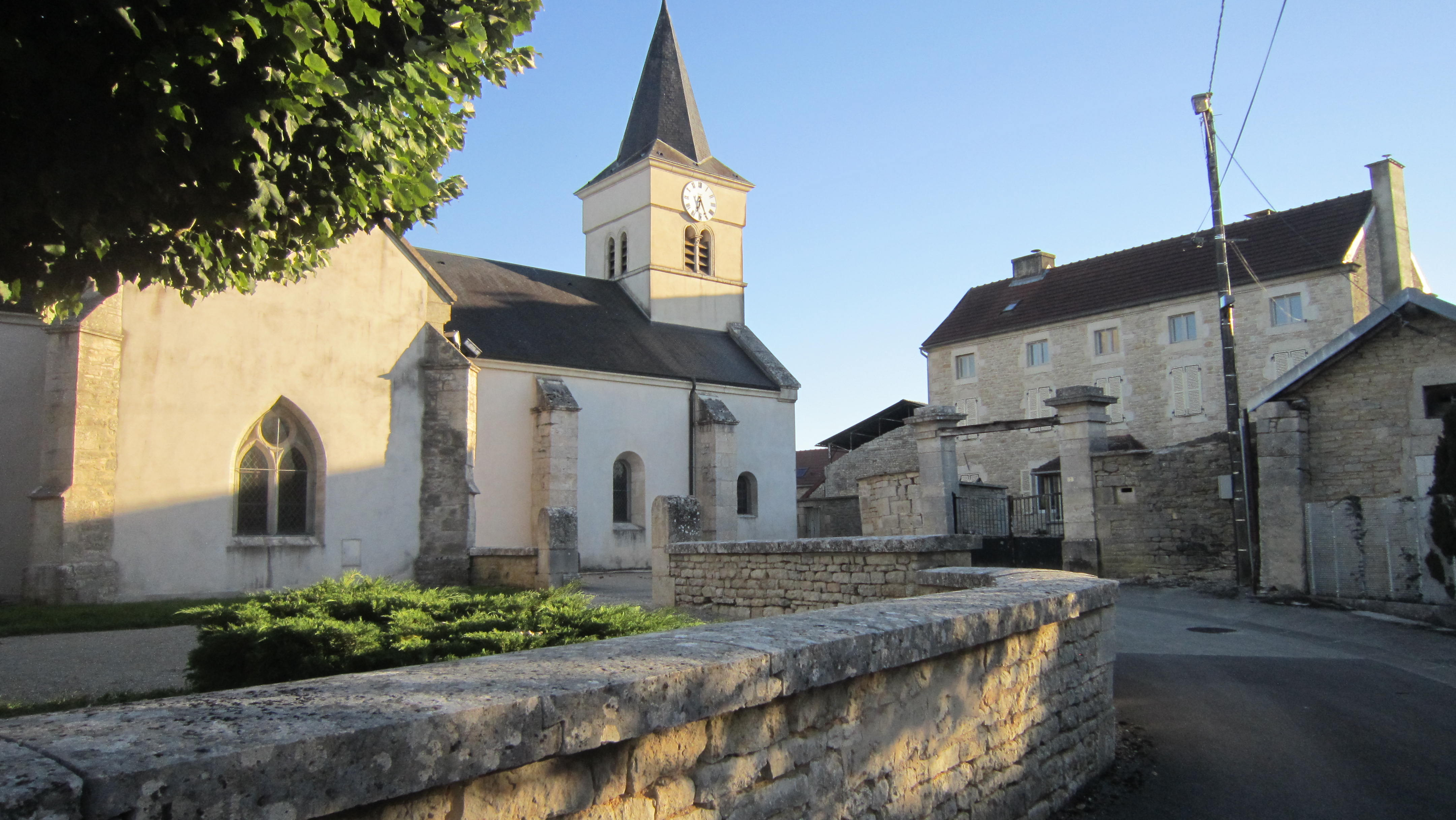
- The church in Balot

- Coat of arms
- Location of Balot
- Location within France Location within Bourgogne-Franche-Comté
- Coordinates: 47°48′51″N 4°25′48″E
- Country: France
- Region: Bourgogne-Franche-Comté
- Department: Côte-d'Or
- Arrondissement: Montbard
- Canton: Châtillon-sur-Seine
- Intercommunality: Pays Châtillonnais

Government
  - Mayor (2020–2026): Cédric Gheeraert
- Area^{1}: 15.54 km^{2} (6.00 sq mi)
- Elevation: 277 m (909 ft)
- Highest elevation: 290 m (950 ft)
- Lowest elevation: 223 m (732 ft)
- Population (2023): 86
  - Density: 5.5/km^{2} (14/sq mi)
- Time zone: UTC+01:00 (CET)
  - Summer (DST): UTC+02:00 (CEST)
- INSEE/Postal code: 21044 /21330
- ^{1} French Land Register data, which excludes lakes, ponds, glaciers > 1 km^{2} (0.386 sq mi or 247 acres) and river estuaries.

Balot (French pronunciation: [balo]) is a commune in the Côte-d'Or department in Bourgogne-Franche-Comté in eastern France.

== Geography ==
Balot is located some 10 km south-west of Châtillon-sur-Seine and 25 km north-east of Montbard. Access to the commune is by the D21 road from Laignes in the north-west which passes through the southern part of the commune and the village and continues south-east to Coulmier-le-Sec. The D118 goes north from the village to join the D965 south-east of Marcenay. The D118J goes north-east from the village to Cérilly. There is some forest in the north-east of the commune but it is mostly farmland.

=== Heraldry ===
Arms of Balot	Blazon: Azure, a bend of Or beneath a lion the same to sinister chief; in chief Argent charged with a key Azure in fesse.

== Administration ==
List of Successive Mayors

From	To	Name
2001	2008	Bernard Fernandes
2008	2014	Pierre Lesponges
2014	2020	Isabelle Voinchet
2020	2026	Cédric Gheeraert

== Demography ==
The inhabitants of the commune are known as Baielois or Baieloises in French.

Historical population

Year	Pop.	±% p.a.
1793	364	—
1821	378	+0.13%
1846	407	+0.30%
1872	306	−1.09%
1901	252	−0.67%
1926	203	−0.86%
1946	169	−0.91%
1962	139	−1.21%
1968	141	+0.24%

Year	Pop.	±% p.a.
1975	103	−4.39%
1982	96	−1.00%
1990	93	−0.40%
1999	93	+0.00%
2007	91	−0.27%
2012	79	−2.79%
2017	90	+2.64%
2023	86	−0.75%

Source: EHESS and INSEE

== Culture and heritage ==
=== Civil heritage ===
The commune has a number of buildings and sites that are registered as historical monuments:

- A House at Rue du Chateau (1837)
- A Sugar Refinery at Rue du Chateau (1834)
- A Farmhouse at Rue d'en Haut (19th century)
- A House at Rue d'en Haut (18th century)
- The Town Hall / School at Rue d'en Haut (19th century)
- Houses and Farms

=== Religious heritage ===
The commune has several religious buildings and structures that are registered as historical monuments:

- A Wayside Cross at CR10/CR4 (1823)
- A Wayside Cross at CVO1/CR16 (1938)
- A Wayside Cross at D118/CR6 (1804)
- A Wayside Cross at D21/CR53 (19th century)
- A Cemetery Cross (1672)
- A Monumental Cross (17th century)
- A Presbytery (1825)
- The Parish Church of Saint Pierre-es-Liens (1865)

The Parish Church contains many items that are registered as historical objects:

- A Statuette: Virgin and child (18th century)
- A Monumental Painting: A Saint bishop and Saint Barbe (16th century)
- A Monumental Painting: 5 Saints including Saint Margaret (16th century)
- A Consecration Cross (16th century)
- The Sennevoy Family Book (17th century)
- 2 Chasubles (19th century)
- 2 Processional Staves (18th century)
- 2 Collection Vases (19th century)
- A Candlestick (19th century)
- An Altar Cross (18th century)
- A Painting: Presentation of Jesus at the Temple (18th century)
- A Painting: Saint Irénée (19th century)
- A Bas-relief: Assumption (18th century)
- A Statue: Saint Nicolas (18th century)
- A Group Sculpture: Education of the Virgin (17th century)
- A Statue: Saint Catherine (1861)
- 2 Statues: Saints Paul and John (19th century)
- The Chapel Enclosure (19th century)
- A Pulpit (19th century)
- 2 Altars, 2 Tabernacles, and 2 Retables (19th century)
- A Tabernacle (17th century)
- The main Altar (18th century)
- Wood Panelling (19th century)
- A Mural Painting, Half-relief, and Statue in the Choir (19th century)
- The Furniture in the Church

== See also ==
- Communes of the Côte-d'Or department
