= Lavau, Aube =

Commune in Grand Est, France

Lavau
- Commune
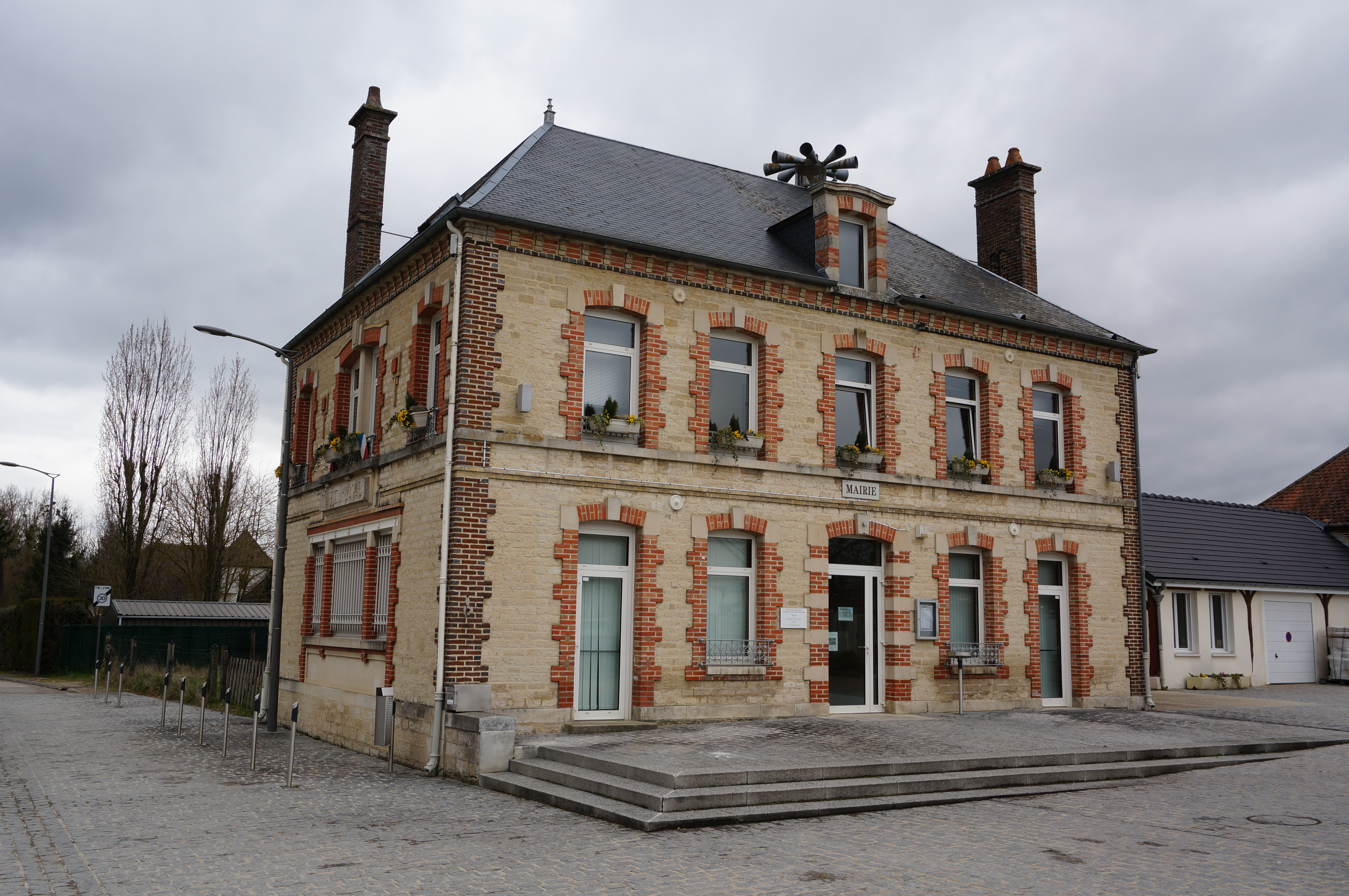
- The town hall in Lavau
- Location of Lavau
- Location within France Location within Grand Est
- Coordinates: 48°19′33″N 4°05′15″E
- Country: France
- Region: Grand Est
- Department: Aube
- Arrondissement: Troyes
- Canton: Creney-près-Troyes
- Intercommunality: CA Troyes Champagne Métropole

Government
  - Mayor (2020–2026): Jacques Gachowski
- Area^{1}: 5.74 km^{2} (2.22 sq mi)
- Elevation: 106 m (348 ft)
- Population (2023): 1,009
  - Density: 176/km^{2} (455/sq mi)
- Time zone: UTC+01:00 (CET)
  - Summer (DST): UTC+02:00 (CEST)
- INSEE/Postal code: 10191 /10150
- ^{1} French Land Register data, which excludes lakes, ponds, glaciers > 1 km^{2} (0.386 sq mi or 247 acres) and river estuaries.

Lavau (French pronunciation: [lavo]) is a commune in the Aube department in north-central France in the Grand Est Region. It is situated on the banks of the river Seine

== Population ==
Historical population
Year	Pop.	±% p.a.
1968	313	—
1975	445	+5.16%
1982	574	+3.70%
1990	485	−2.08%
1999	472	−0.30%
2007	771	+6.33%
2012	945	+4.15%
2017	943	−0.04%
2023	1,009	+1.13%
Source: INSEE

== Archaeological Finds ==
In 2014 the 2,500-year-old tomb of an Iron Age Celtic prince was unearthed in Lavau. The tomb revealed artifacts of the Hallstatt Celtic culture, with Greek and possibly Etruscan trade goods. The tomb was covered with a tumulus of about 40 metres in diameter. Cinerary urns and other artefacts dating to the Bronze Age Tumulus and Urnfield cultures were also excavated, along with the early Iron Age burials of a warrior buried with his sword and a woman adorned with bronze bracelets. Around 500 BC (final Hallstatt), these ancient funerary monuments were united by the means of ditches with the Hallstatt-era princely tomb in a monumental funerary ensemble.

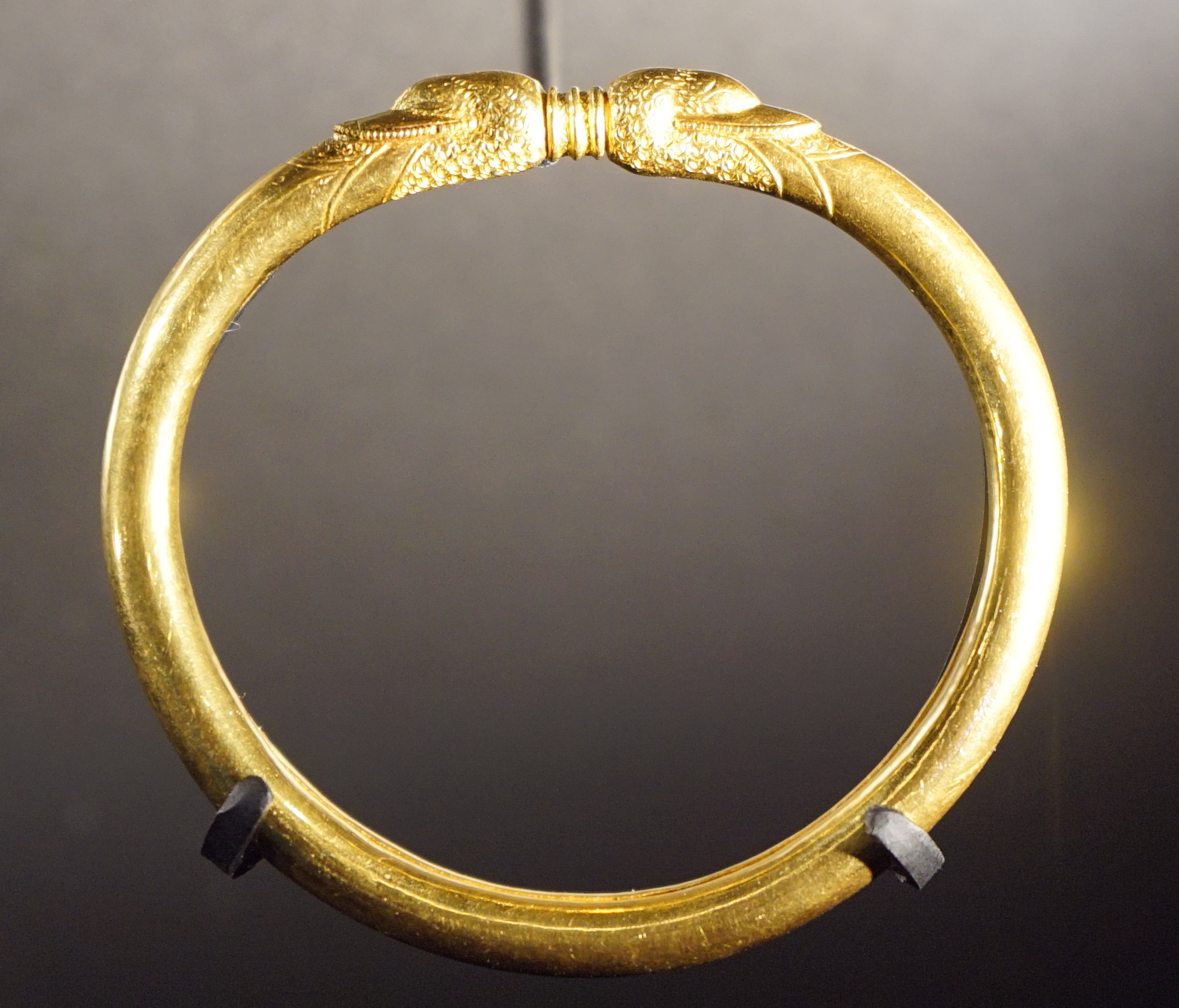
Celtic gold bracelet

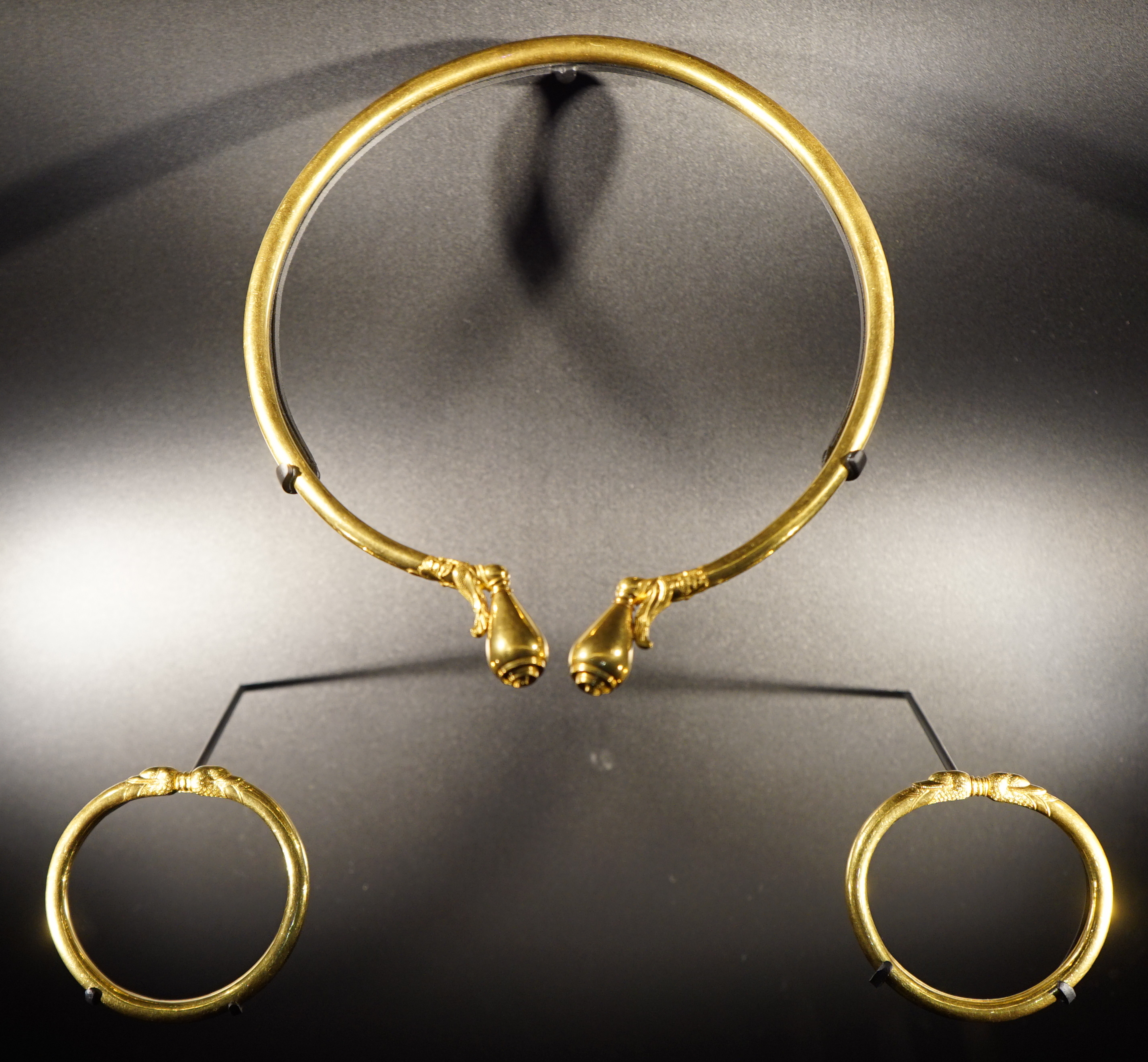
Celtic gold torc and bracelets

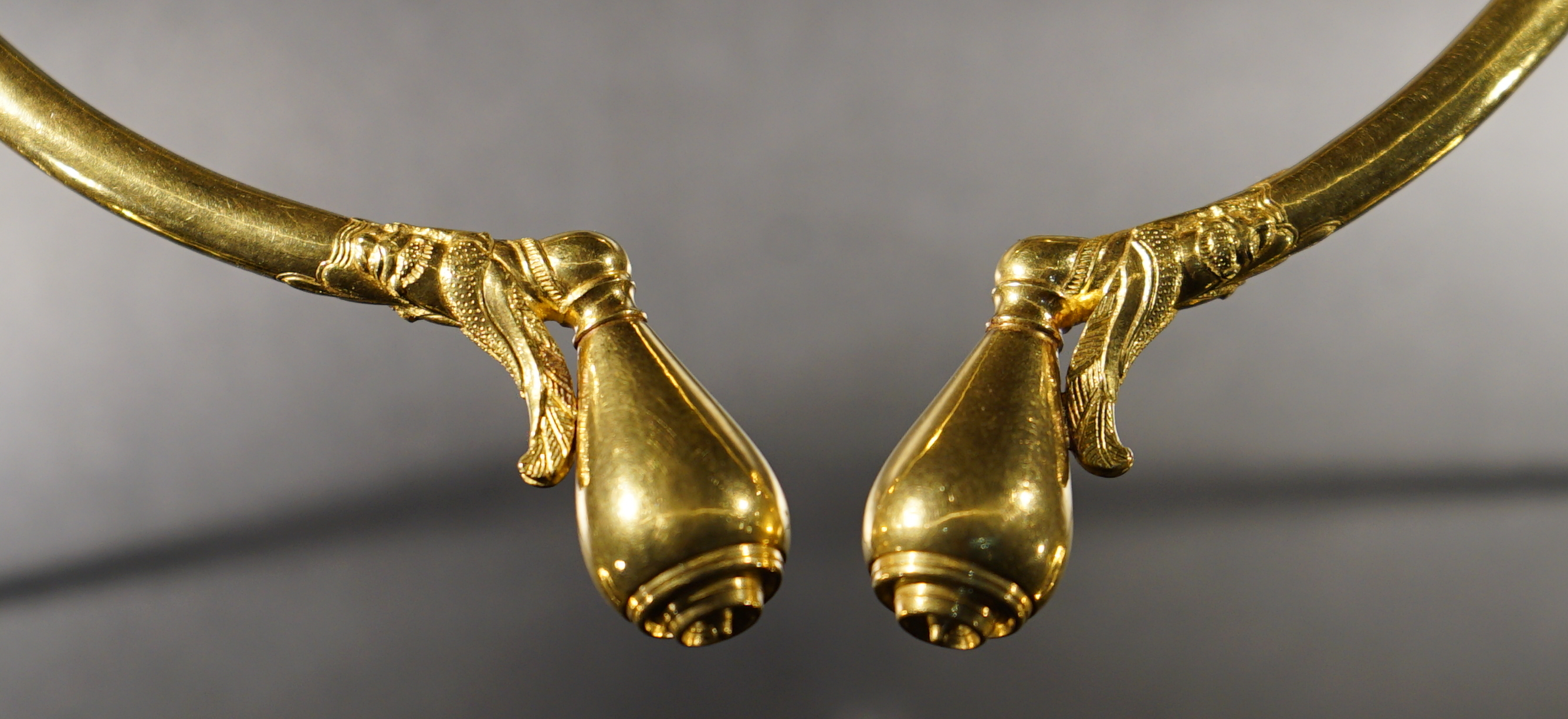
Gold torc, detail

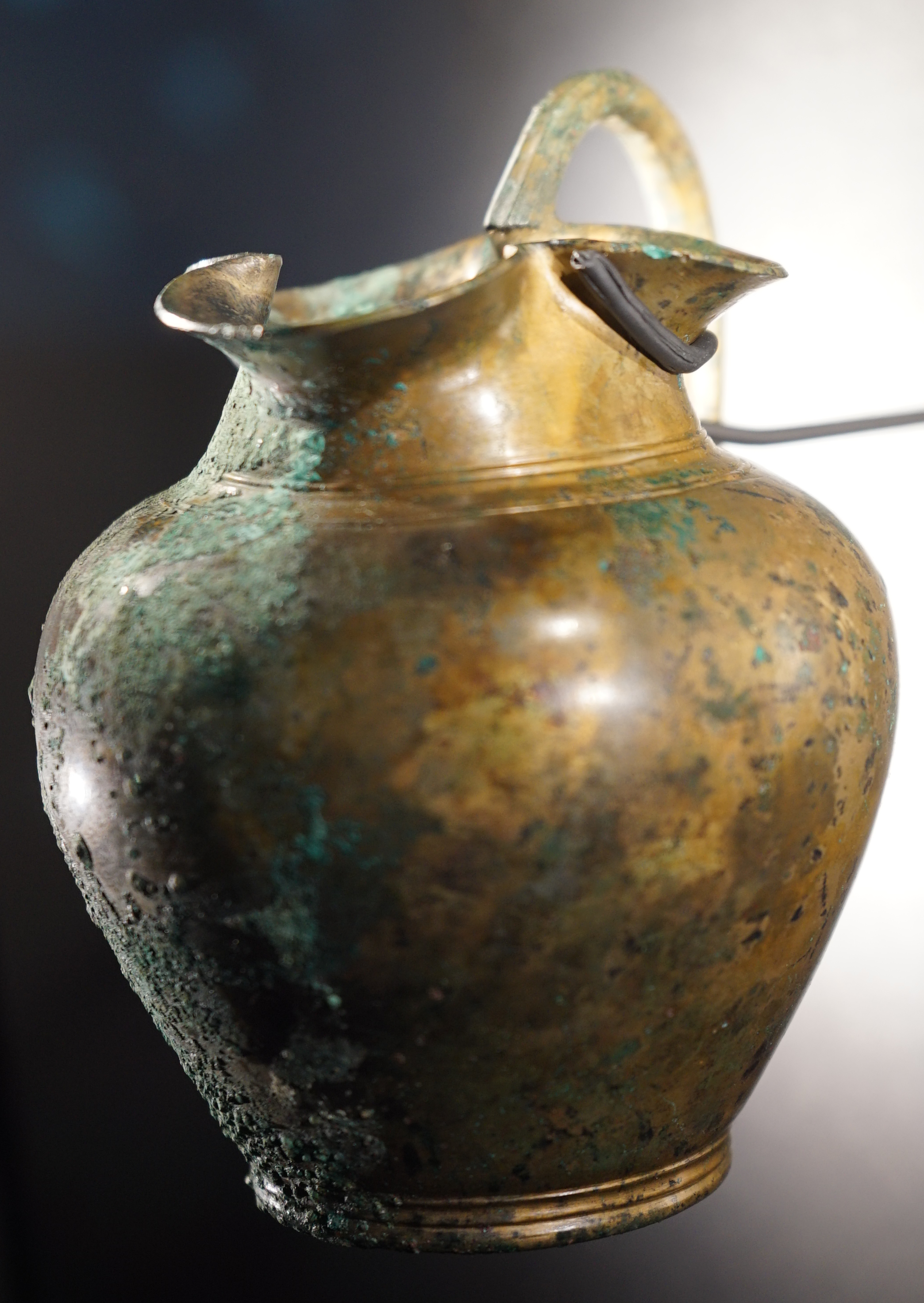
Bronze flagon

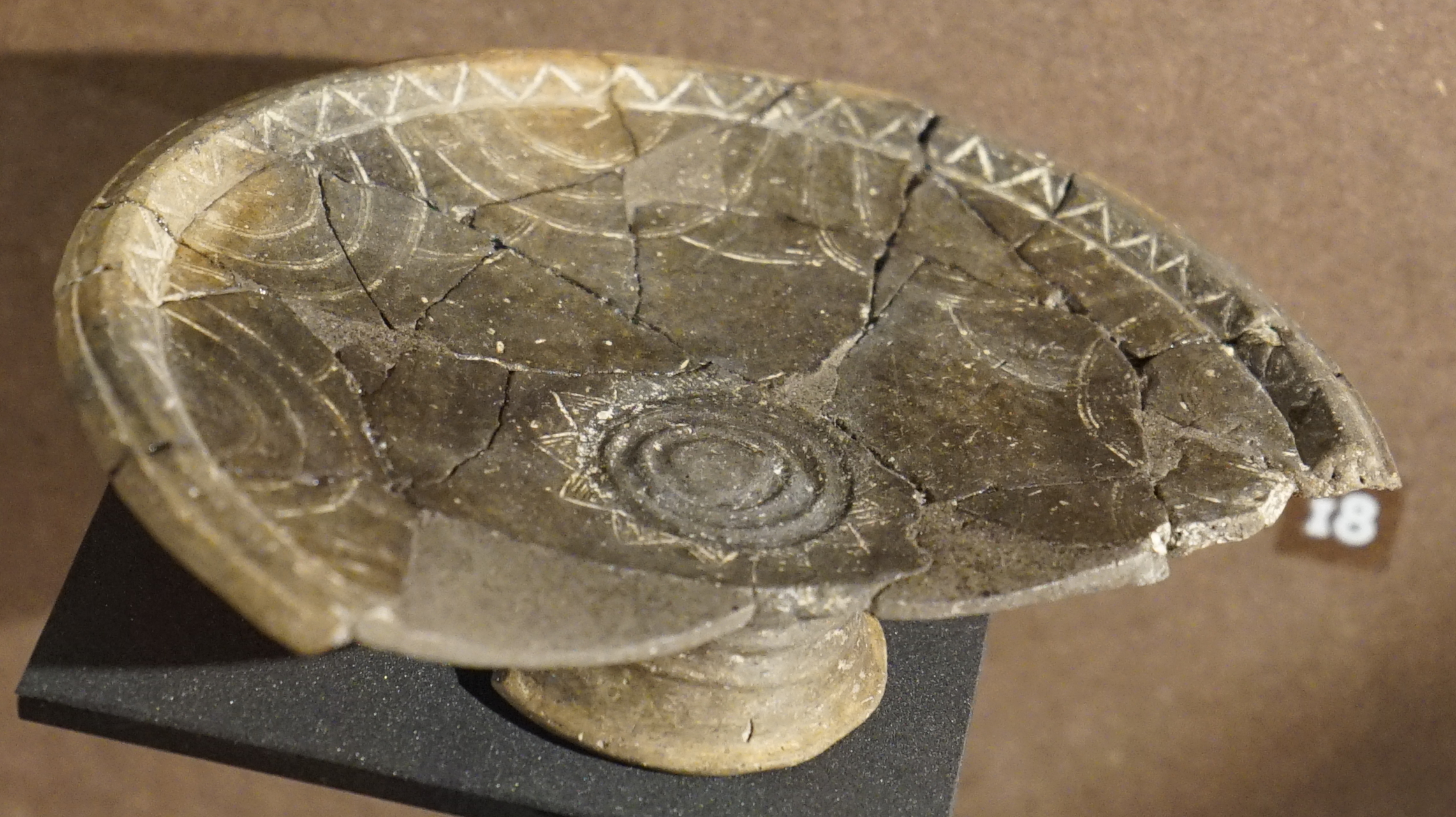
Urnfield culture ceramic

== See also ==
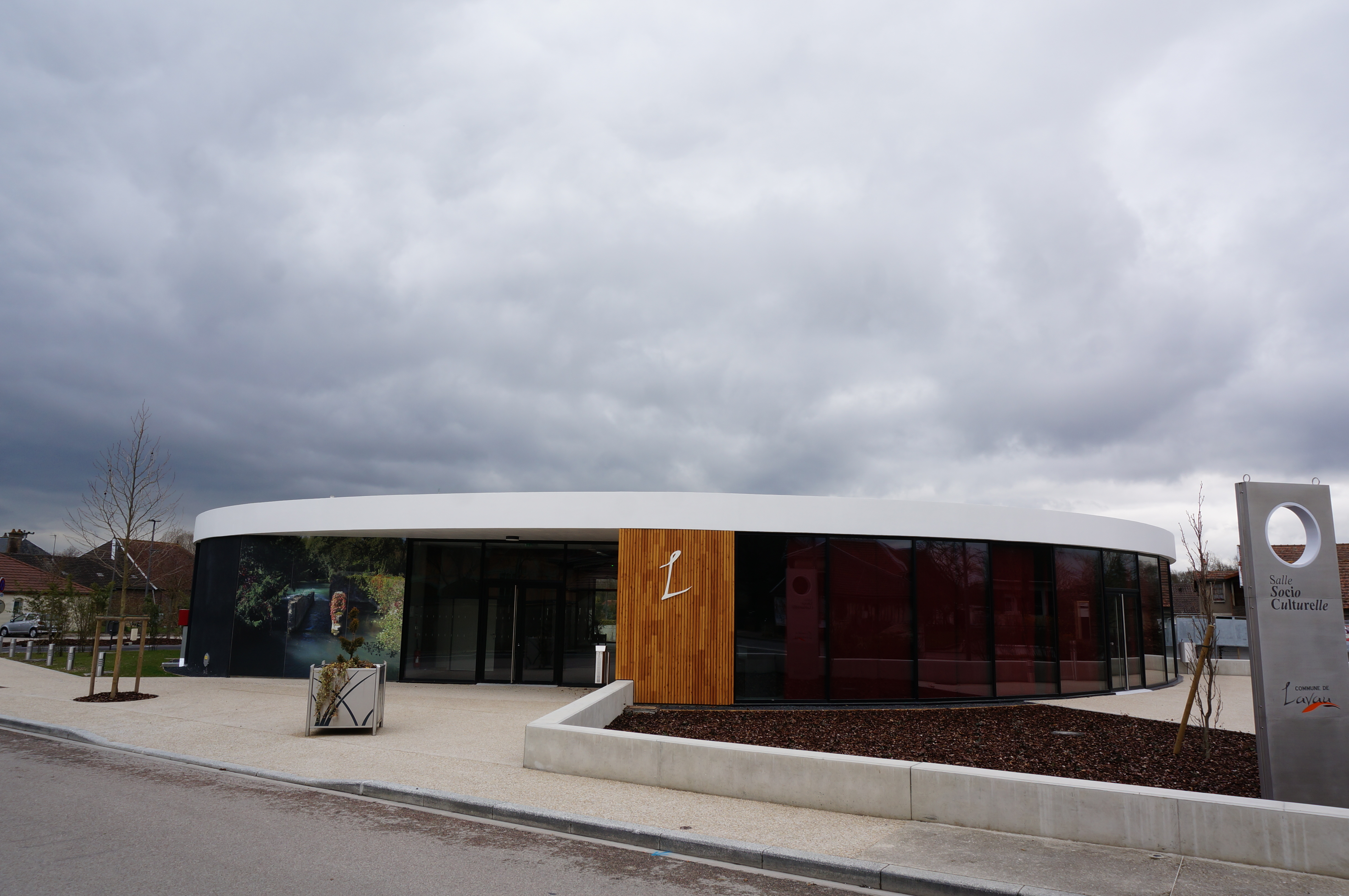
Lavau hall

- Communes of the Aube department
- Vix Grave
- Sainte-Colombe-sur-Seine
