= Faton =

Faton is a given name. Notable people with the name include:

- Faton Bislimi (born 1983), Albanian activist
- Faton Macula, Albanian guitarist
- Faton Maloku (born 1991), Kosovan footballer
- Faton Peci (born 1982), Albanian politician
- Faton Popova (born 1984), German-Albanian footballer
- Faton Toski (born 1987), German footballer
- Faton Xhemaili (born 1998), Albanian footballer
