= Châtillon-sur-Seine =

- Commune
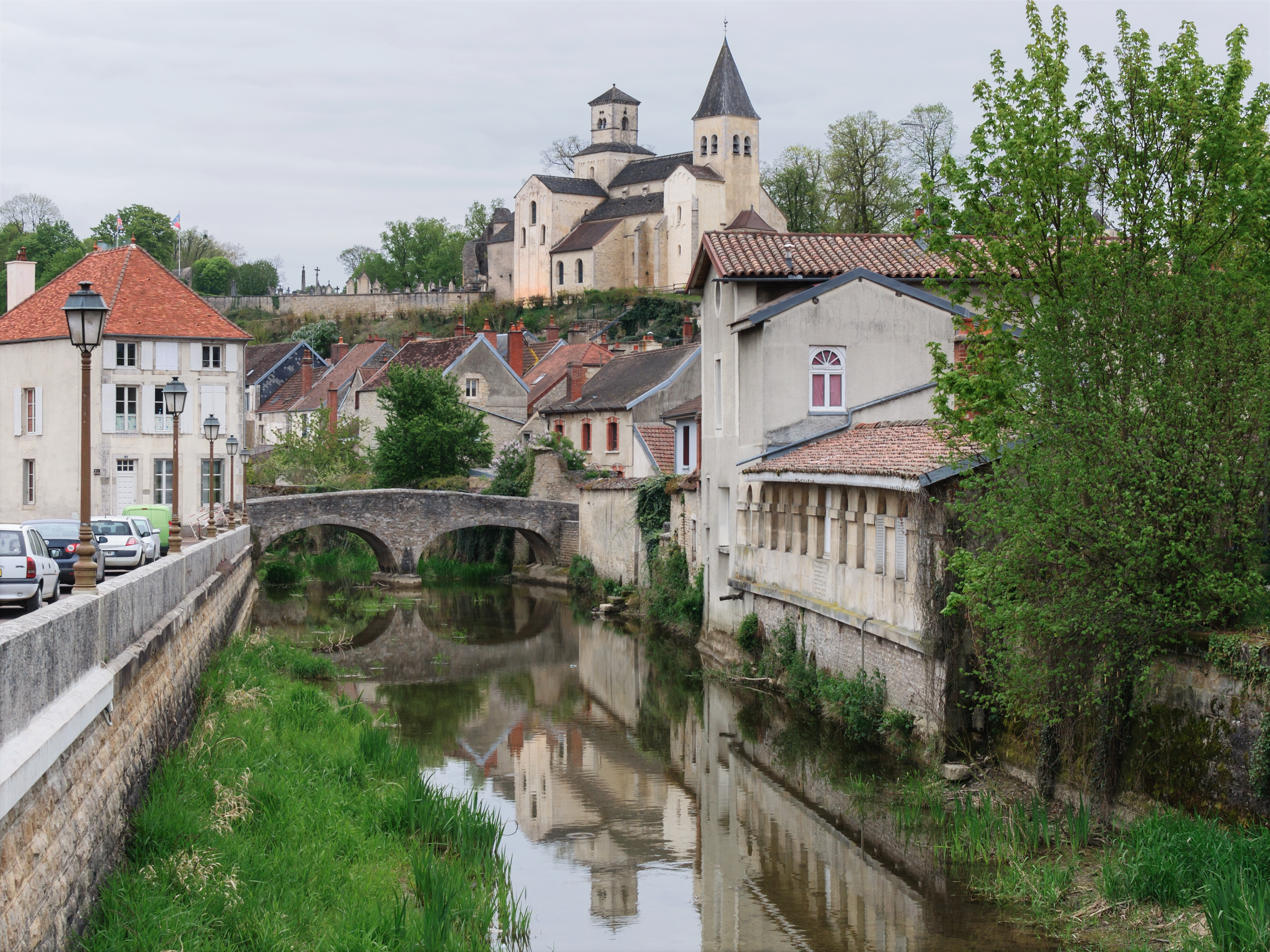
- The Pertuis-au-Loup bridge over the River Seine and the church

- Flag Coat of arms
- Location of Châtillon-sur-Seine
- Location within France Location within Bourgogne-Franche-Comté
- Coordinates: 47°52′12″N 4°34′22″E
- Country: France
- Region: Bourgogne-Franche-Comté
- Department: Côte-d'Or
- Arrondissement: Montbard
- Canton: Châtillon-sur-Seine

Government
  - Mayor (2022–2026): Roland Lemaire
- Area^{1}: 33.15 km^{2} (12.80 sq mi)
- Elevation: 225 m (738 ft)
- Highest elevation: 298 m (978 ft)
- Lowest elevation: 211 m (692 ft)
- Population (2023): 5,443
  - Density: 164.2/km^{2} (425.3/sq mi)
- Time zone: UTC+01:00 (CET)
  - Summer (DST): UTC+02:00 (CEST)
- INSEE/Postal code: 21154 /21400
- ^{1} French Land Register data, which excludes lakes, ponds, glaciers > 1 km^{2} (0.386 sq mi or 247 acres) and river estuaries.

Châtillon-sur-Seine (French pronunciation: [ʃɑtijɔ̃ syʁ sɛn]; lit. 'Châtillon-on-Seine') is a commune of the Côte-d'Or department, eastern France. The Musée du Pays Châtillonnais is housed in the old abbey of Notre-Dame de Châtillon, within the town, known for its collection of pre-Roman and Roman relics (especially the famous Vix Grave).

== History ==
Some ruins on an eminence above the town mark the site of a château of the dukes of Burgundy. Nearby stands the church of St Vorles of the 10th century, but with many additions of later date; it contains a sculptured Holy Sepulchre of the 16th century and a number of frescoes. In a fine park stands a modern château built by Marshal Marmont, duke of Ragusa, born at Châtillon in 1774. It was burnt in 1871, and subsequently rebuilt.

Châtillon anciently consisted of two parts, Chaumont, belonging to the duchy of Burgundy, and Bourg, ruled by the bishop of Langres; it did not coalesce into one town until the end of the 16th century. It was taken by the English in 1360 and by Louis XI in 1475, during his struggle with Charles the Bold. Châtillon was one of the first cities to adhere to the League, but suffered severely from the oppression of its garrisons and governors, and in 1595 made voluntary submission to Henry IV. It is associated with the abortive conference of 1814 between the representatives of Napoleon and the Allies.

During World War II the German garrison were forced to withdraw after a successful operation by the Special Air Service operating in the nearby forest in late August 1944.

== Geography ==
=== Climate ===
Châtillon-sur-Seine has an oceanic climate (Köppen climate classification Cfb). The average annual temperature in Châtillon-sur-Seine is 10.8 °C (51.4 °F). The average annual rainfall is 832.8 mm (32.79 in) with October as the wettest month. The temperatures are highest on average in July, at around 19.3 °C (66.7 °F), and lowest in January, at around 3.1 °C (37.6 °F). The highest temperature ever recorded in Châtillon-sur-Seine was 42.1 °C (107.8 °F) on 25 July 2019; the coldest temperature ever recorded was −22.4 °C (−8.3 °F) on 9 January 1985.

Climate data for Châtillon-sur-Seine (1991–2020 averages, extremes 1948−present)
Month	Jan	Feb	Mar	Apr	May	Jun	Jul	Aug	Sep	Oct	Nov	Dec	Year
Record high °C (°F)	18.2 (64.8)	22.7 (72.9)	25.6 (78.1)	29.0 (84.2)	33.0 (91.4)	39.5 (103.1)	42.1 (107.8)	41.5 (106.7)	35.7 (96.3)	31.2 (88.2)	23.0 (73.4)	19.6 (67.3)	42.1 (107.8)
Mean daily maximum °C (°F)	6.2 (43.2)	7.8 (46.0)	12.0 (53.6)	15.7 (60.3)	19.6 (67.3)	23.4 (74.1)	26.0 (78.8)	25.9 (78.6)	21.3 (70.3)	16.1 (61.0)	10.2 (50.4)	6.8 (44.2)	15.9 (60.6)
Daily mean °C (°F)	3.1 (37.6)	3.7 (38.7)	6.8 (44.2)	9.6 (49.3)	13.4 (56.1)	17.0 (62.6)	19.3 (66.7)	19.2 (66.6)	15.2 (59.4)	11.5 (52.7)	6.6 (43.9)	3.8 (38.8)	10.8 (51.4)
Mean daily minimum °C (°F)	−0.1 (31.8)	−0.3 (31.5)	1.5 (34.7)	3.5 (38.3)	7.2 (45.0)	10.5 (50.9)	12.5 (54.5)	12.4 (54.3)	9.1 (48.4)	6.8 (44.2)	3.1 (37.6)	0.8 (33.4)	5.6 (42.1)
Record low °C (°F)	−22.4 (−8.3)	−22.0 (−7.6)	−18.5 (−1.3)	−7.1 (19.2)	−4.0 (24.8)	−0.4 (31.3)	0.4 (32.7)	1.2 (34.2)	−2.0 (28.4)	−8.3 (17.1)	−12.5 (9.5)	−20.6 (−5.1)	−22.4 (−8.3)
Average precipitation mm (inches)	68.2 (2.69)	59.2 (2.33)	62.2 (2.45)	61.6 (2.43)	76.3 (3.00)	66.8 (2.63)	67.2 (2.65)	62.1 (2.44)	68.2 (2.69)	81.2 (3.20)	79.0 (3.11)	80.8 (3.18)	832.8 (32.79)
Average precipitation days (≥ 1.0 mm)	11.9	11.5	10.8	10.0	11.0	9.8	9.3	8.8	9.3	11.5	12.2	13.7	129.8
Mean monthly sunshine hours	67.3	90.0	147.8	183.3	200.5	228.6	234.5	215.0	176.0	120.9	71.5	56.8	1,792.2
Source: Météo France

== Personalities ==
Châtillon-sur-Seine was the birthplace of:

- Auguste Marmont, duke of Ragusa (1774–1852), Marshal of France
- Anne Nicole Voullemier (1796-1886), painter and lithographer
- Désiré Nisard (1806–1888), author and critic
- Louis Paul Cailletet (1832–1913), physicist and inventor
- Alice Prin (Kiki de Montparnasse) (1901–1953), nightclub singer, actress, model, partner and muse of Man Ray, and painter
- Danielle Georgette Reddé (1911–2007), French resistance member during World War II
- Damien Saez (1977), singer and songwriter.

== Population ==
Historical population

Year	Pop.	±% p.a.
1793	3,700	—
1800	3,725	+0.10%
1806	3,900	+0.77%
1821	3,863	−0.06%
1831	4,175	+0.78%
1836	4,430	+1.19%
1841	4,614	+0.82%
1846	4,771	+0.67%
1851	5,061	+1.19%
1856	4,926	−0.54%
1861	4,836	−0.37%
1866	4,860	+0.10%
1872	4,797	−0.22%
1876	4,994	+1.01%
1881	5,265	+1.06%
1886	5,317	+0.20%
1891	5,127	−0.73%
1896	4,794	−1.33%
1901	4,807	+0.05%

Year	Pop.	±% p.a.
1906	4,812	+0.02%
1911	4,698	−0.48%
1921	4,413	−0.62%
1926	4,642	+1.02%
1931	4,727	+0.36%
1936	4,849	+0.51%
1946	4,240	−1.33%
1954	4,609	+1.05%
1962	5,518	+2.28%
1968	6,264	+2.14%
1975	7,383	+2.38%
1982	7,561	+0.34%
1990	6,862	−1.21%
1999	6,269	−1.00%
2007	5,801	−0.97%
2012	5,487	−1.11%
2017	5,373	−0.42%
2023	5,443	+0.22%

Source: EHESS and INSEE (1968-2023)

== See also ==
- Communes of the Côte-d'Or department
