= Hallstatt Museum =

Museum Hallstatt
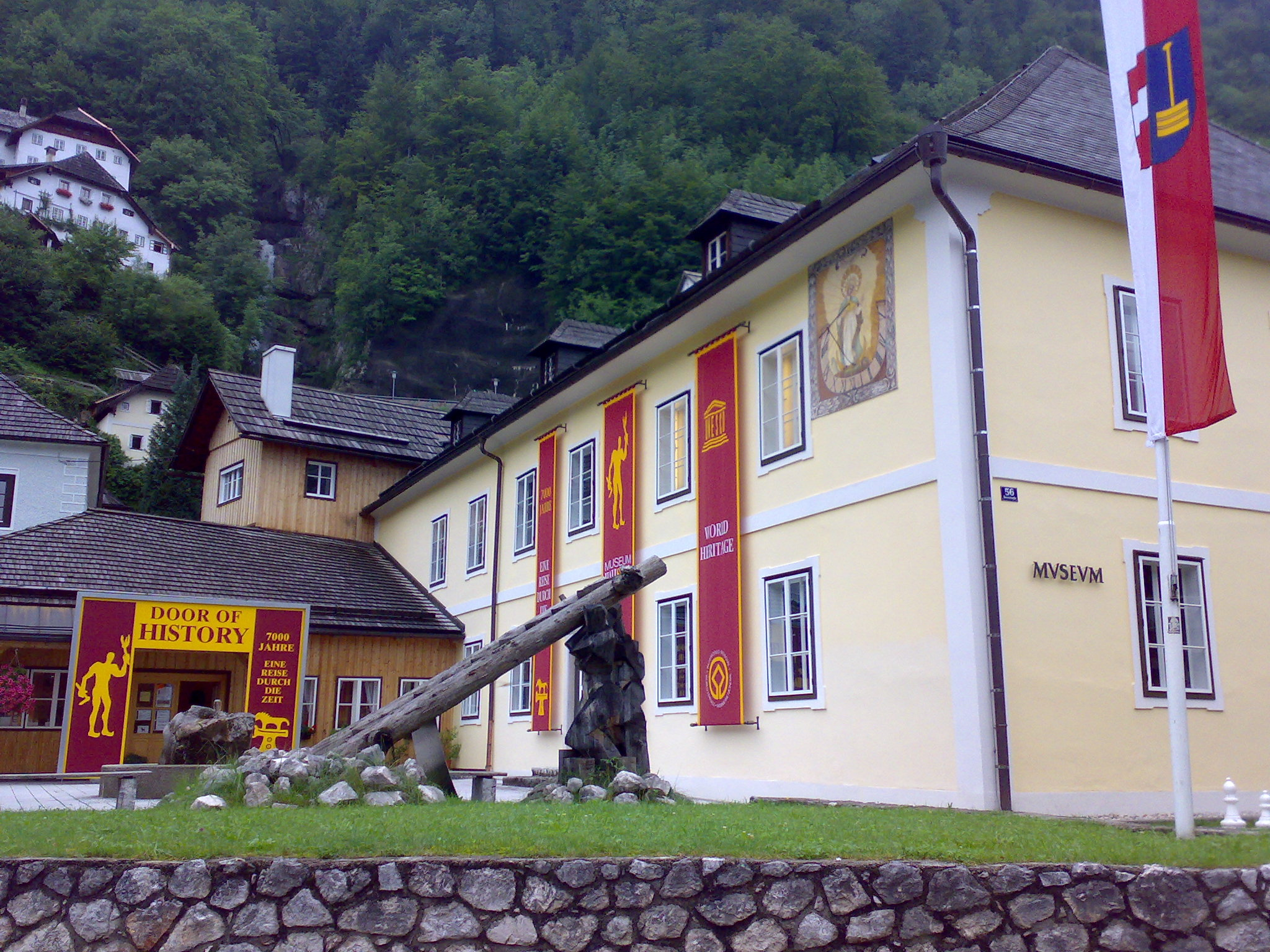
- Museum Hallstatt
- Established: 1884
- Location: Hallstatt, Austria
- Coordinates: 47°33′43″N 13°38′56″E
- Type: Historical museum
- Website: www.museum-hallstatt.at

The Hallstatt Museum (German: Museum Hallstatt) is a museum in Hallstatt, Upper Austria, that has an unrivalled collection of discoveries from the local salt mines and from the cemeteries of Iron Age date near to the mines, which have made Hallstatt the type site for the important Hallstatt culture. The museum is close to the Hallstättersee, below the salt mines on the mountainside. The museum, the salt mines, and the Dachstein Ice Cave are designated as an UNESCO World Heritage Site.

Since 2002 the museum has occupied the former Hallstatt parsonage, and the previous holdings of the museum have been reunited with many of the objects which had previously been on display at the Naturhistorisches Museum in Vienna.

== History ==
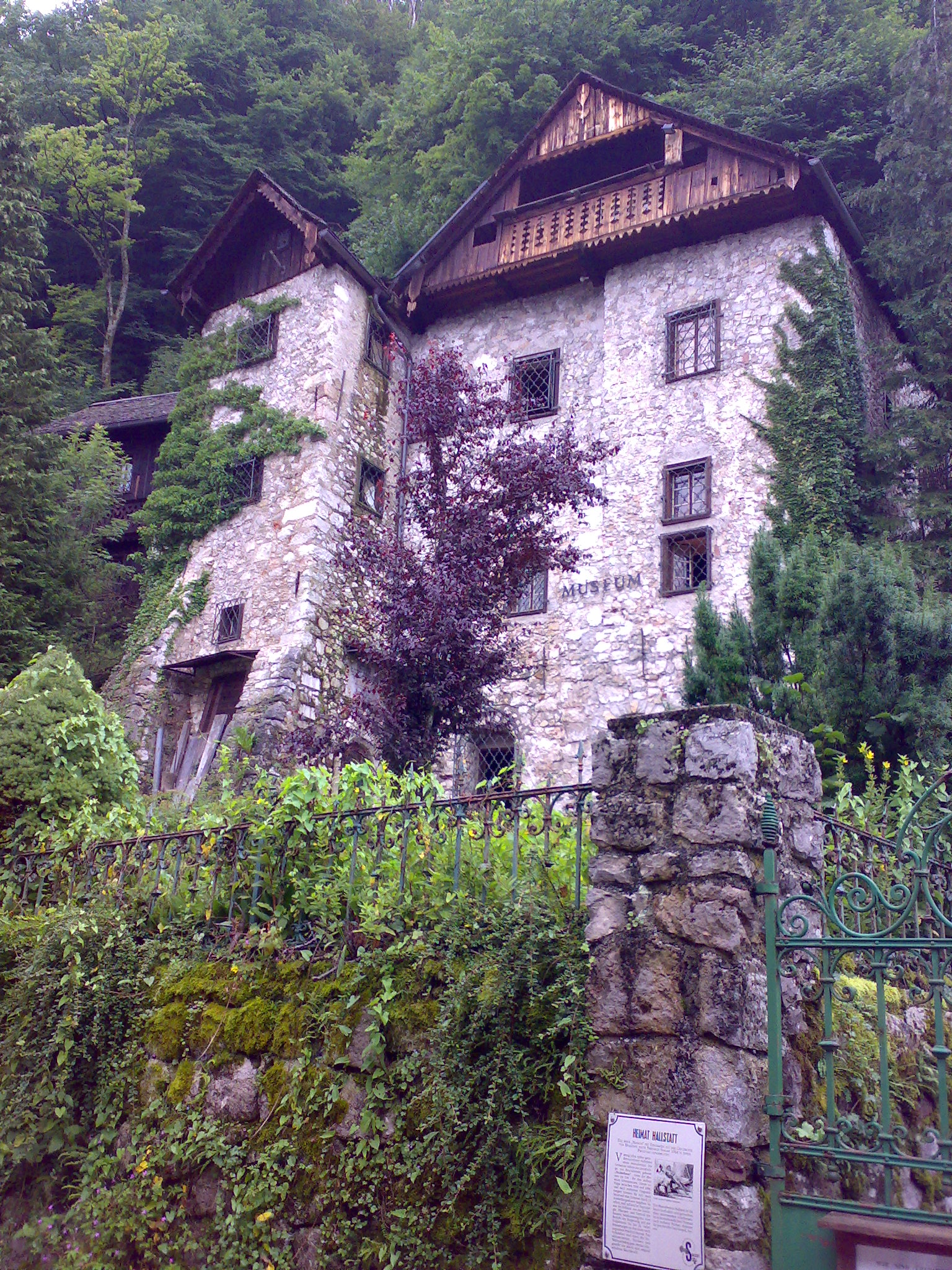
The old Hallstatt Museum

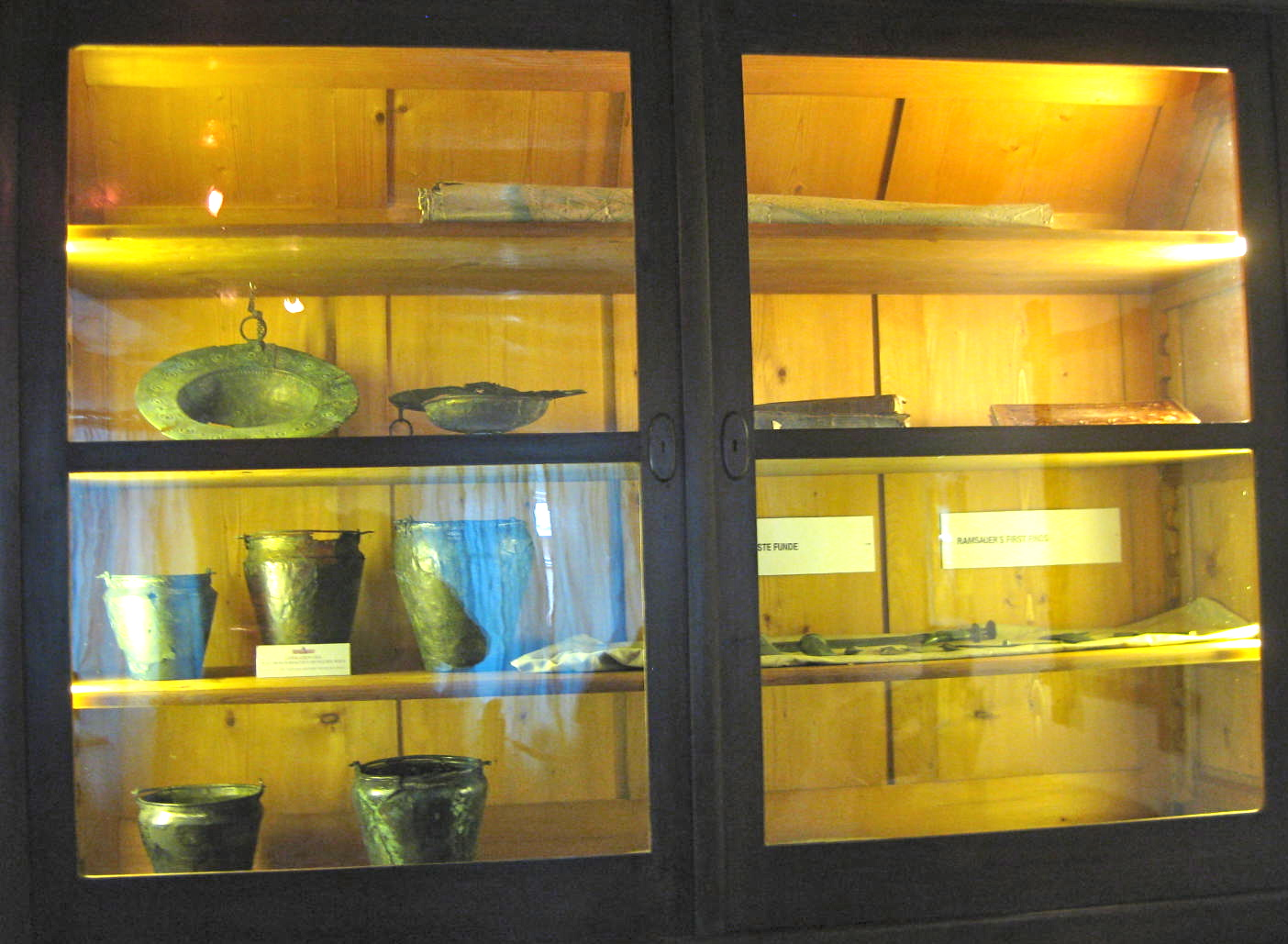
An old display case from the former museum, used to display Hallstatt grave goods

The earliest discoveries were made in 1846 by Johann Georg Ramsauer, who was the Bergmeister or Official of the Habsburg Salt Mines. He started a series of meticulous excavations on the cemeteries around the mines between 1846 and 1867. He was helped with this by a mining assistant, Isodor Engl. Then from 1871 to 1878, Engl continued the excavations on behalf of the Museum Francisco-Carolinum in Linz. Many of these earlier finds became part of the collections in Linz Museum. In 1884 the Hallstatt Museum Association started to form a museum collection. In 1889, the Anthropological Society of Vienna and the Vienna Naturhistorisches Museum joined with the Hallstatt museum to undertake further excavation. The excavator was Bergrat Hutter, and he was assisted by Isodor Engl. This led to many of the most important discoveries being placed on display in Vienna. In 1895 Engl became the curator of the Hallstatt museum. In 1907 new excavations were started by Marie, Duchess of Mecklenburg - Schwerin, who had the support of Kaiser Franz Joseph and Kaiser Wilhelm (on behalf of the Berlin Museum)), who excavated 40 graves. She was a leading figure in Iron Ages studies and conducted many excavations. However, after the 1st World War, her collection was confiscated by the Serbian Government. In 1934 the collection was sold in the United States and the finds from Hallstatt were acquired by the Peabody Museum, in Cambridge, Massachusetts.

Isodor Engl was followed as the museum's curator by Frederick Morton in 1925. In 1927 Morton and Adolf Mahr began a new series of excavations, both in the mines and above ground. Their excavations were at first on the ‘Grünerwerk’ area of Bronze Age Salt Mining. This was followed in 1937–1939 by excavations in the ‘Damweise’ and the North Western part of the cemetery. This produced a further 61 burials dating to the period 600-350BC.

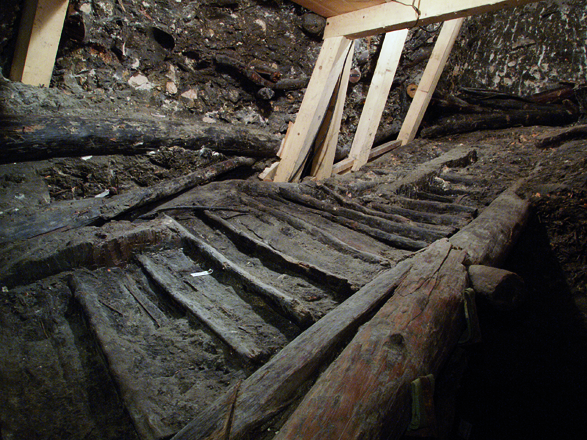
Wooden staircase dating from the Bronze Age in the Mine

After the 2nd World War the collections were reorganized by Franz Zahler and Karl Höplinger. In 1969 the Museum was renamed the ‘Praehistorisches Museum’. During this period, study of collections proceeded jointly with the Vienna Naturhistorisches Museum. In particular the work of In 2002 the “Museum Hallstatt” was re-opened in the present premises and many of the discoveries brought back from Vienna. Since 2002 the Naturhistorisches Museum has established a branch study centre ‘Die montanarchäologischen Forschungen’ in the ‘Bergschmiede‘ and undertakes further research and excavations. In 2010 and important further group of burials was uncovered and in 2013 a wooden staircase from the ‘Christian von Tuschwerk’, has been moved to a show area within the mine and dated by dendrochronology to the Bronze Age :1344 -1343 BCE.

== Ramsauer's Protokoll ==
In the period 1846–1863 Ramsauer started, at the suggestion of the Museum Francisco-Carolium, a record of his discoveries. The quality of his records were well in advance of contemporary archaeological recording. These records are known as the ‘Protokoll’ and are now held in the Naturhistorisches Museum. The watercolour drawings of the burials were largely undertaken by his assistant Isodor Engl. About 980 burials are recorded as well as about 19,497 grave goods. Slightly over half of these burials are inhumations and the remainder are cremations. In 1859, Ramsauer approached the Kaiser Franz Joseph I, in the hope that these records could be published, but this was declined, presumably because of the considerable cost of colour printing.

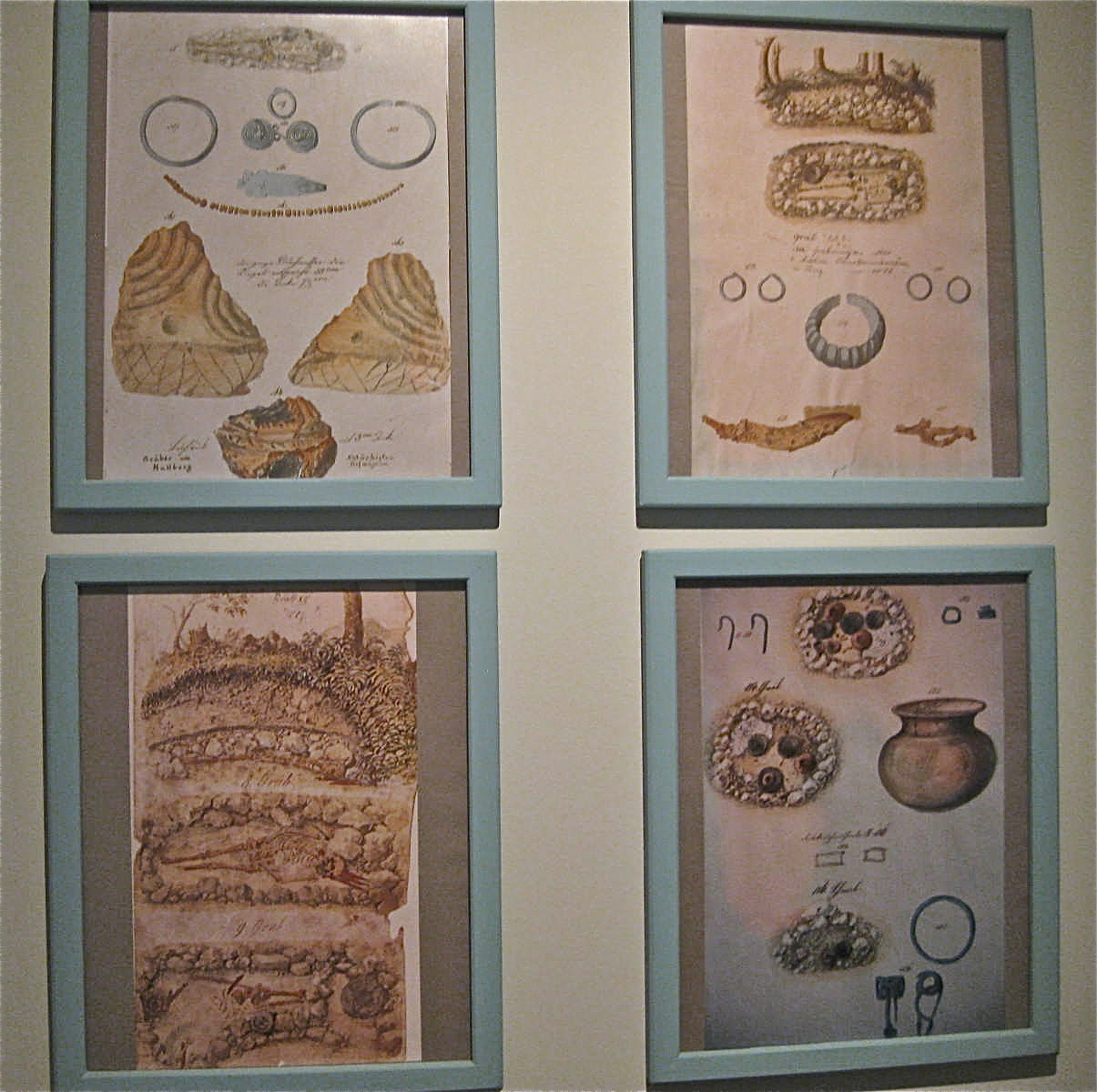
Drawings from the Protokoll

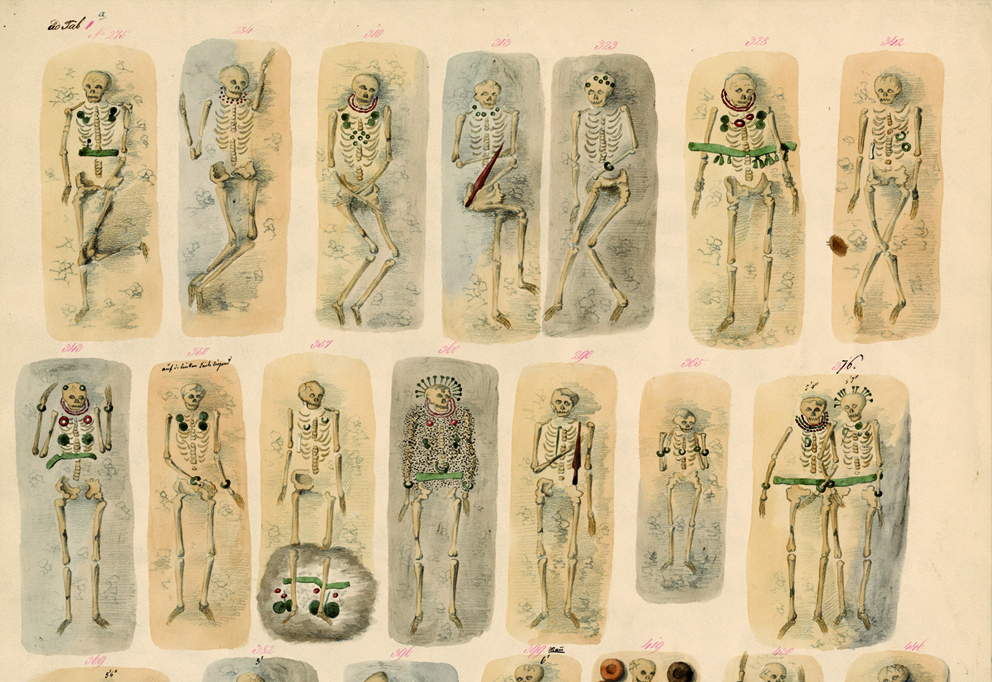
Drawings from the Protokoll

== Finds from the salt mines ==
Salt mining in the Hallstatt region commenced in the late Neolithic, and on display in the museum are late Neolithic stone axes and shaft-hole axe-hammers, probably of the Bronze Age.

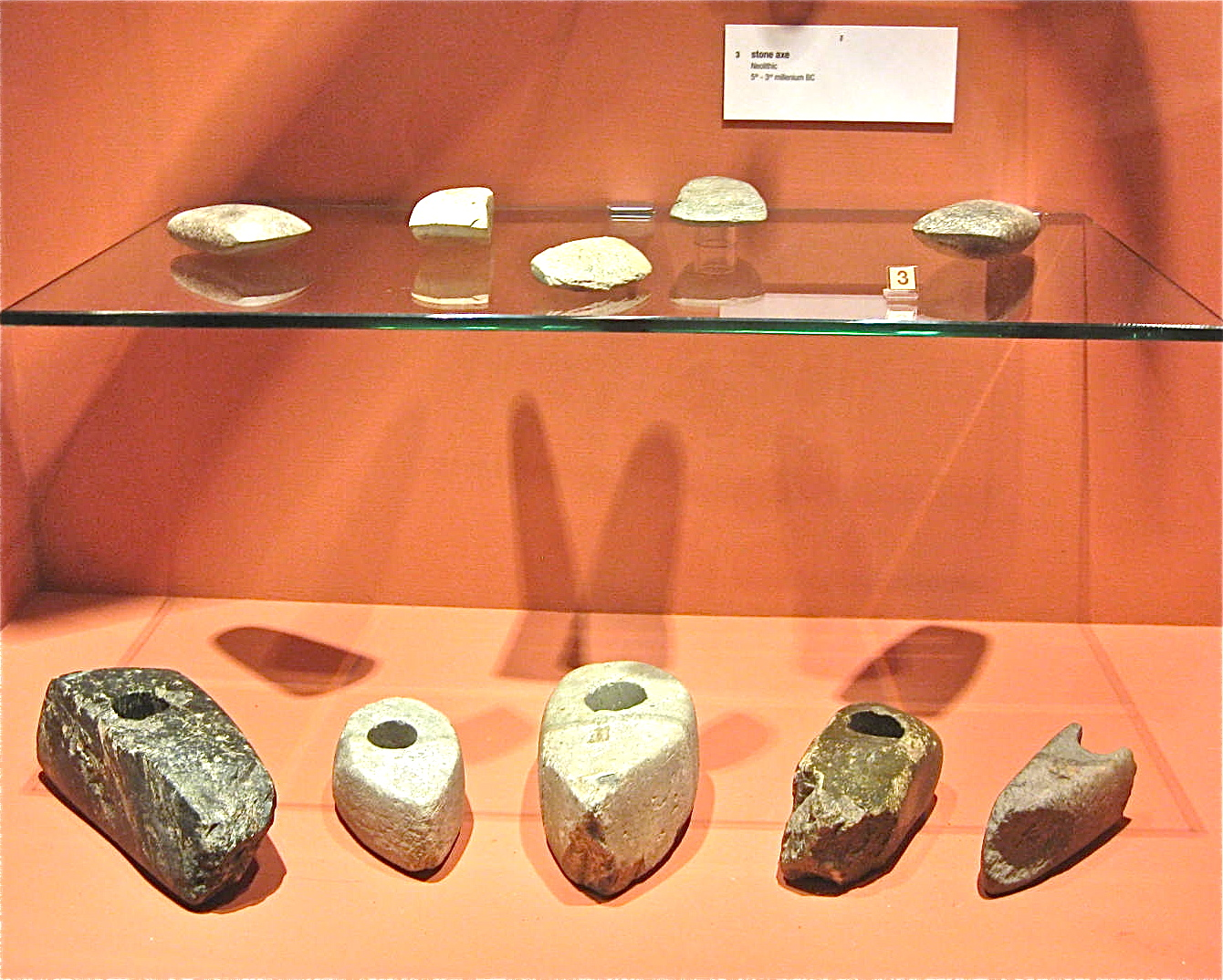
Neolithic stone axes and Bronze Age axe-hammers

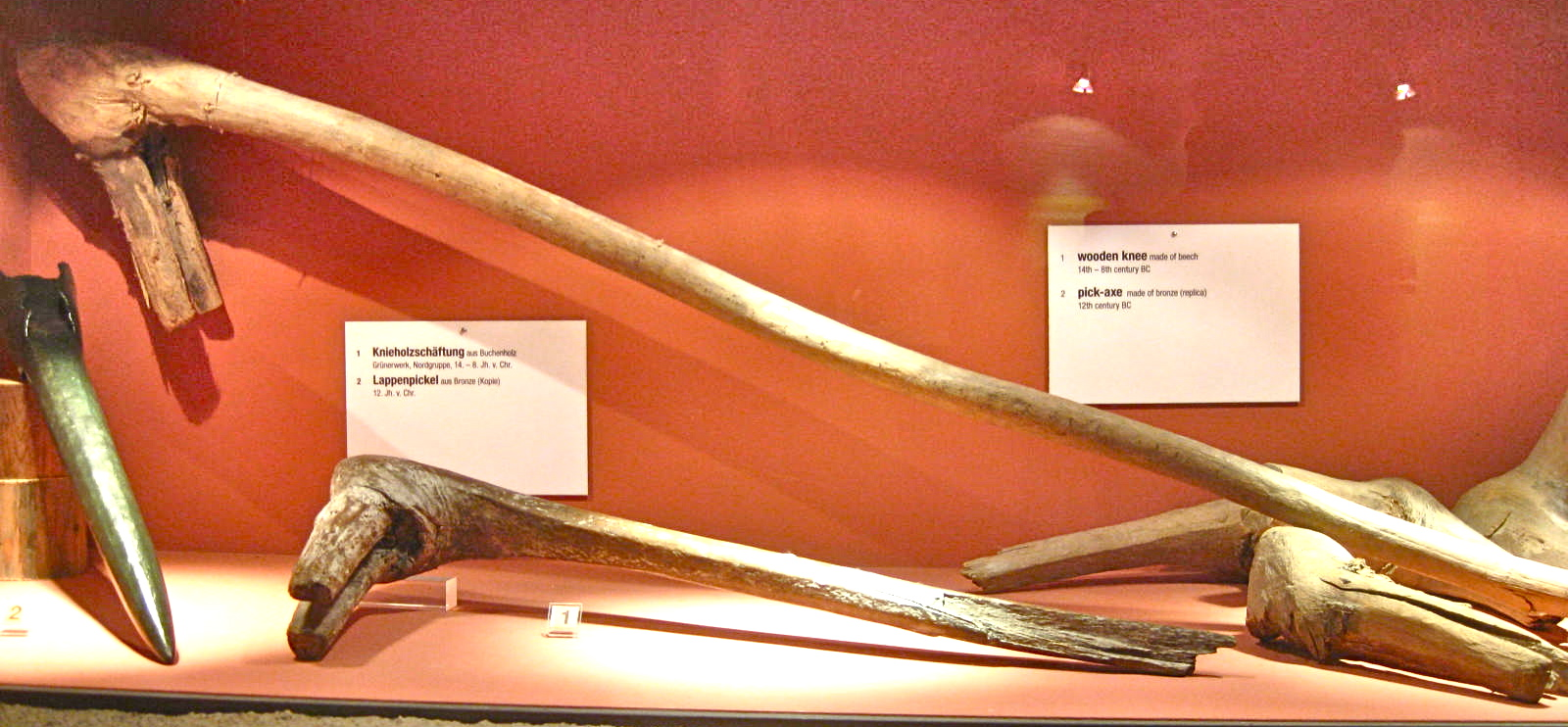
Miner's bronze pick and pick shafts

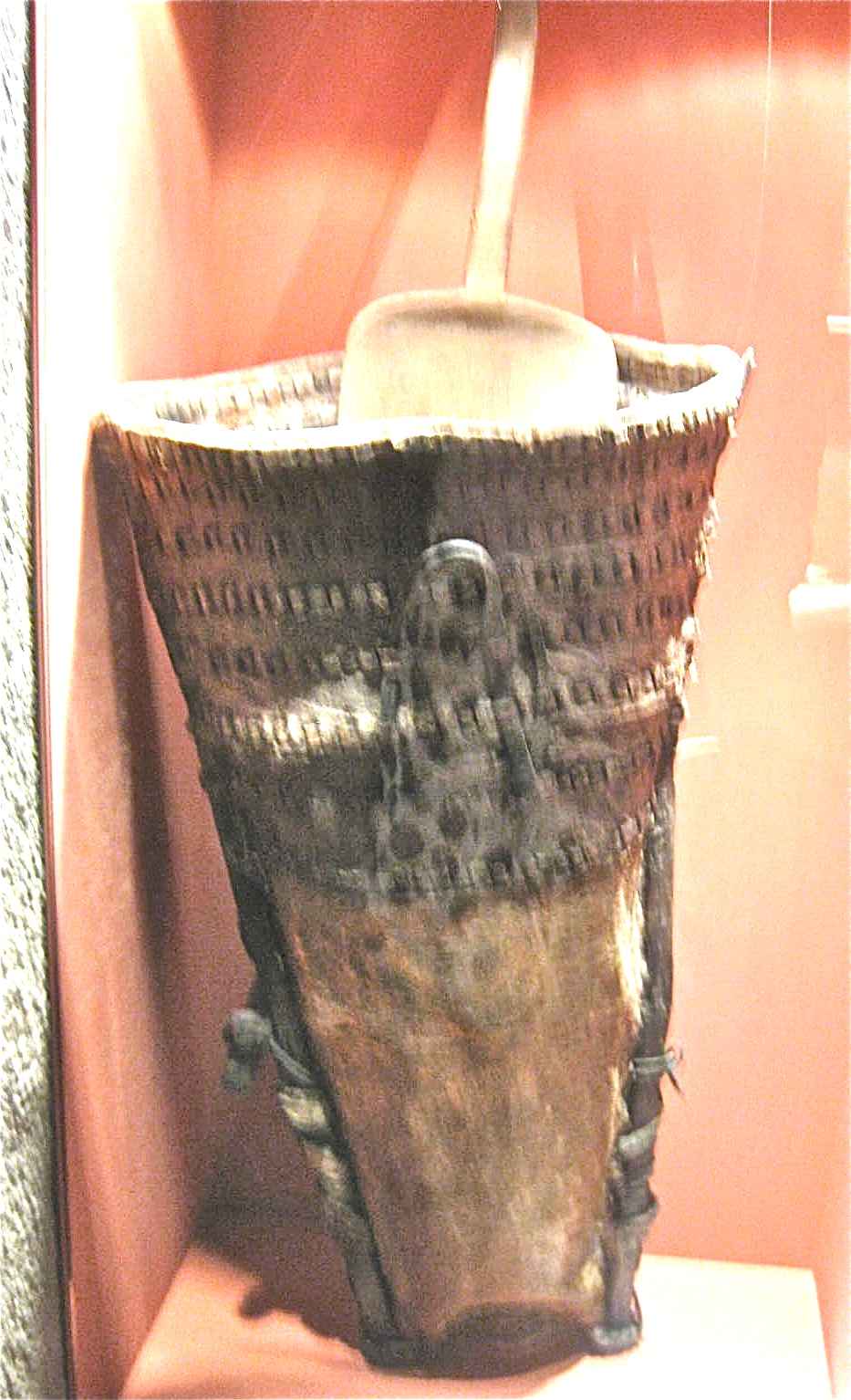
Decorated leather backpack for carrying salt

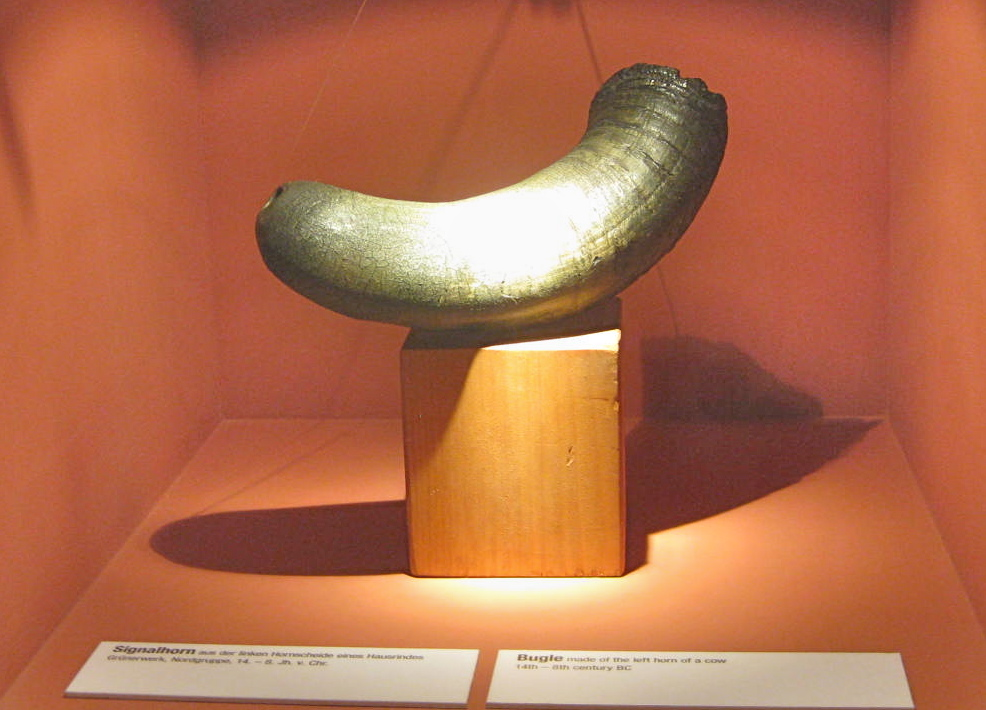
Drinking horn

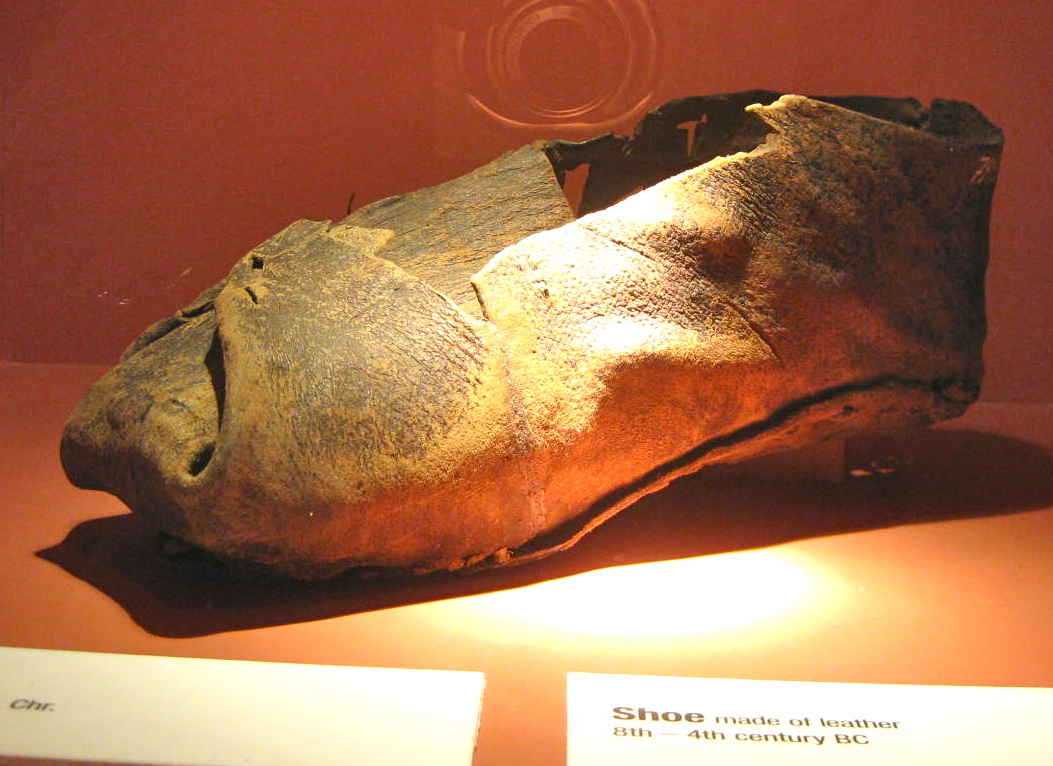
Miner's leather shoe

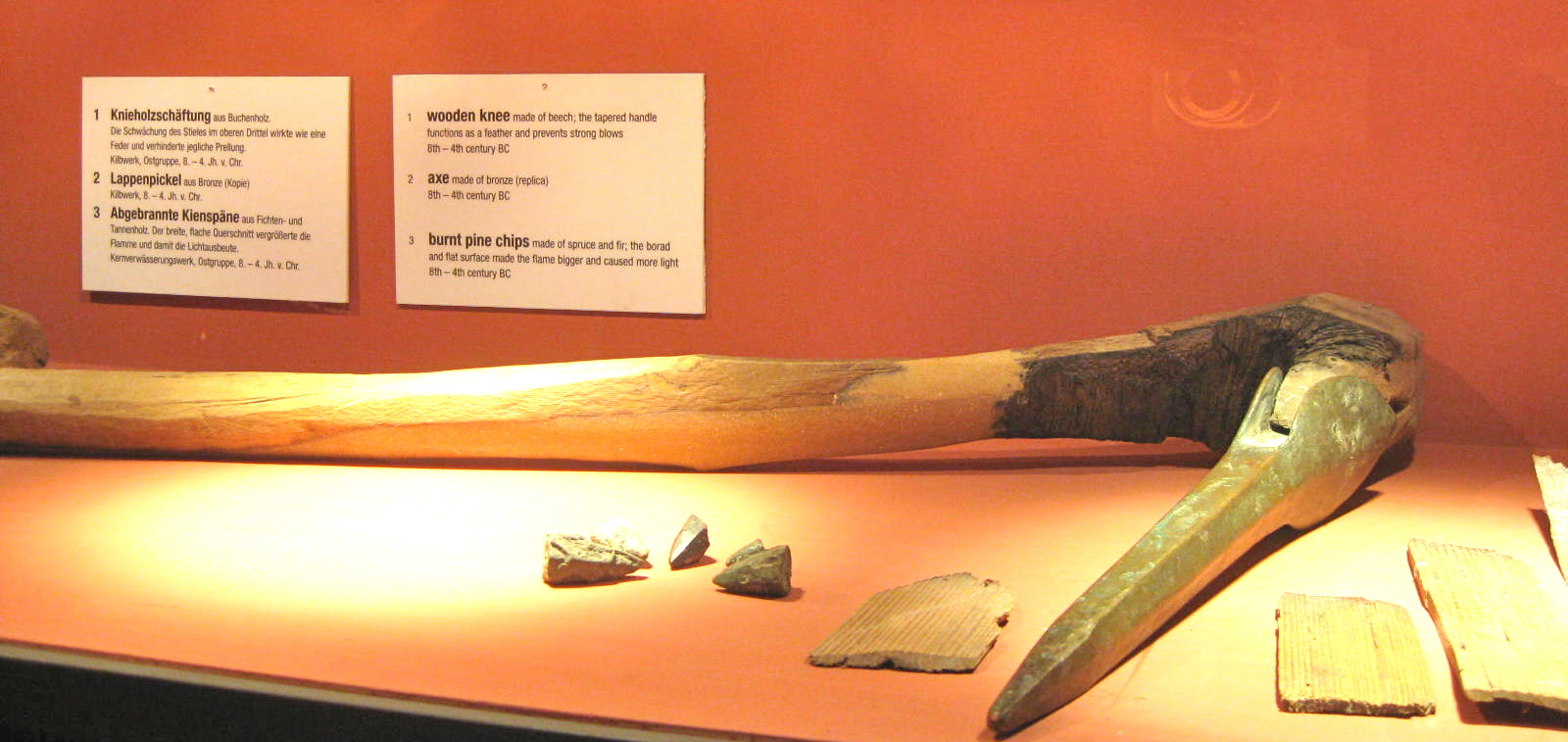
Bronze hafted pick

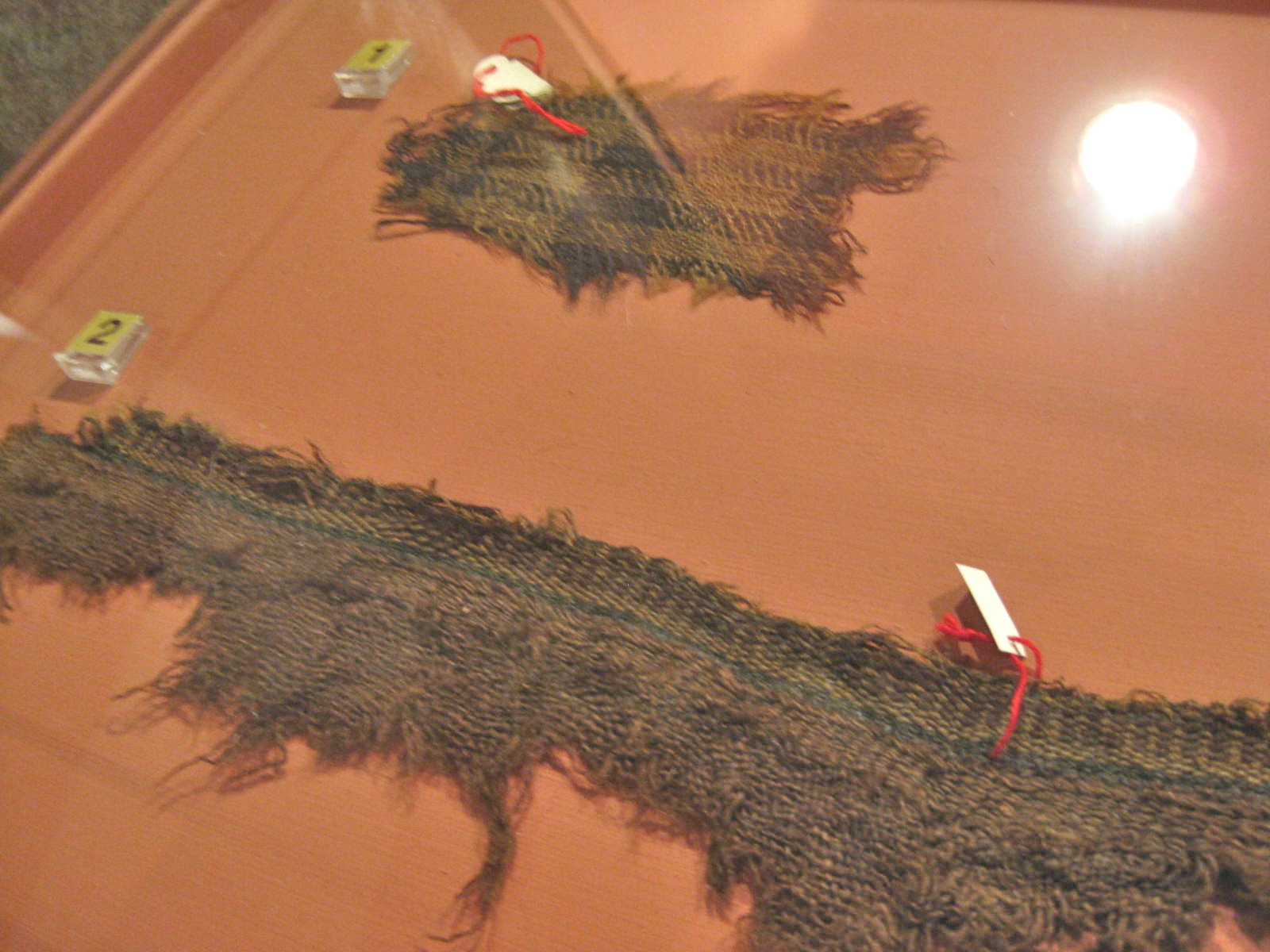
Woven cloth fragments

== Finds from the burials ==
=== Swords, axes and weapons ===
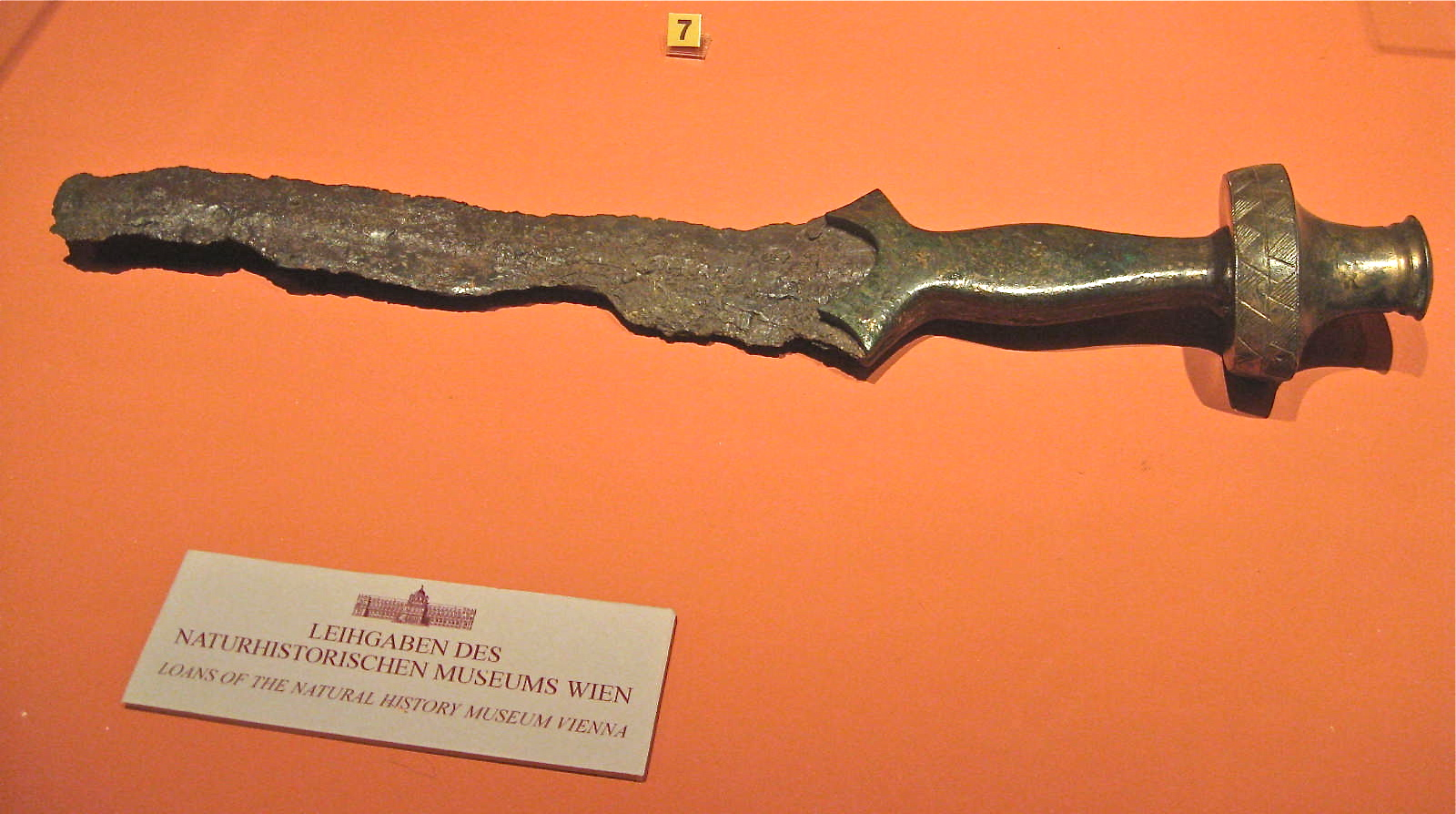
Museum Hallstatt: Iron Mindelheim sword

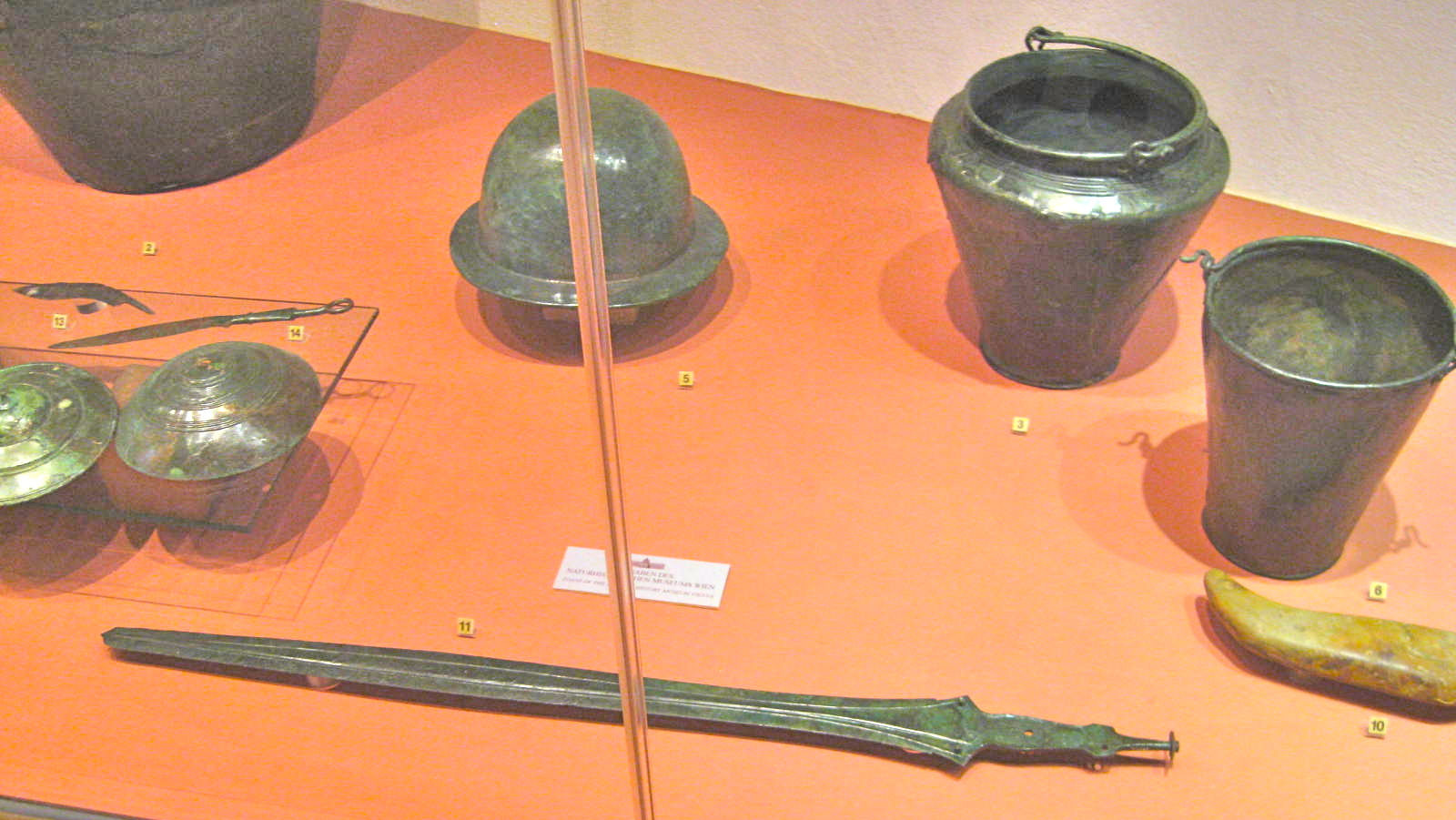
Museum Hallstatt. Situla, helmet and bronze Gundlingen sword in foreground.

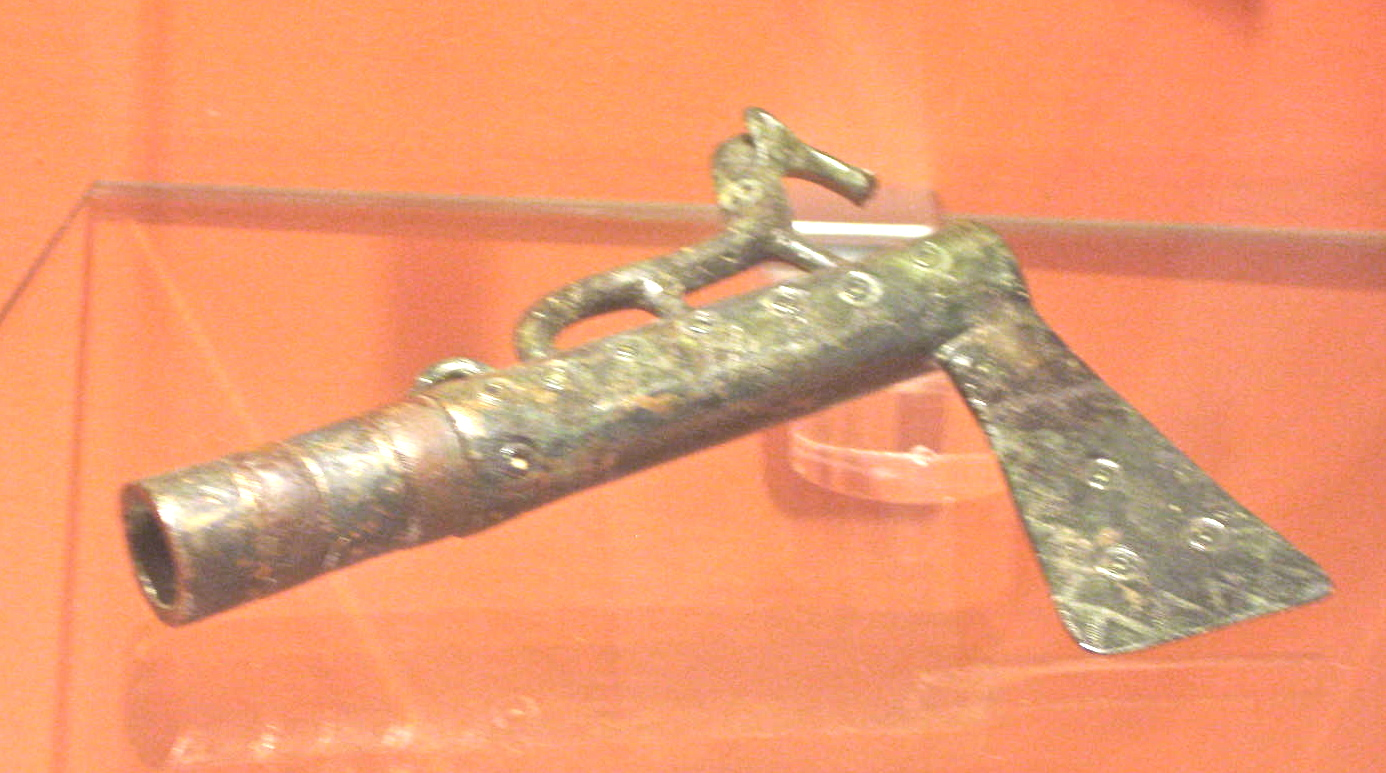
Museum Hallstatt Decorated axe with horse ornament.

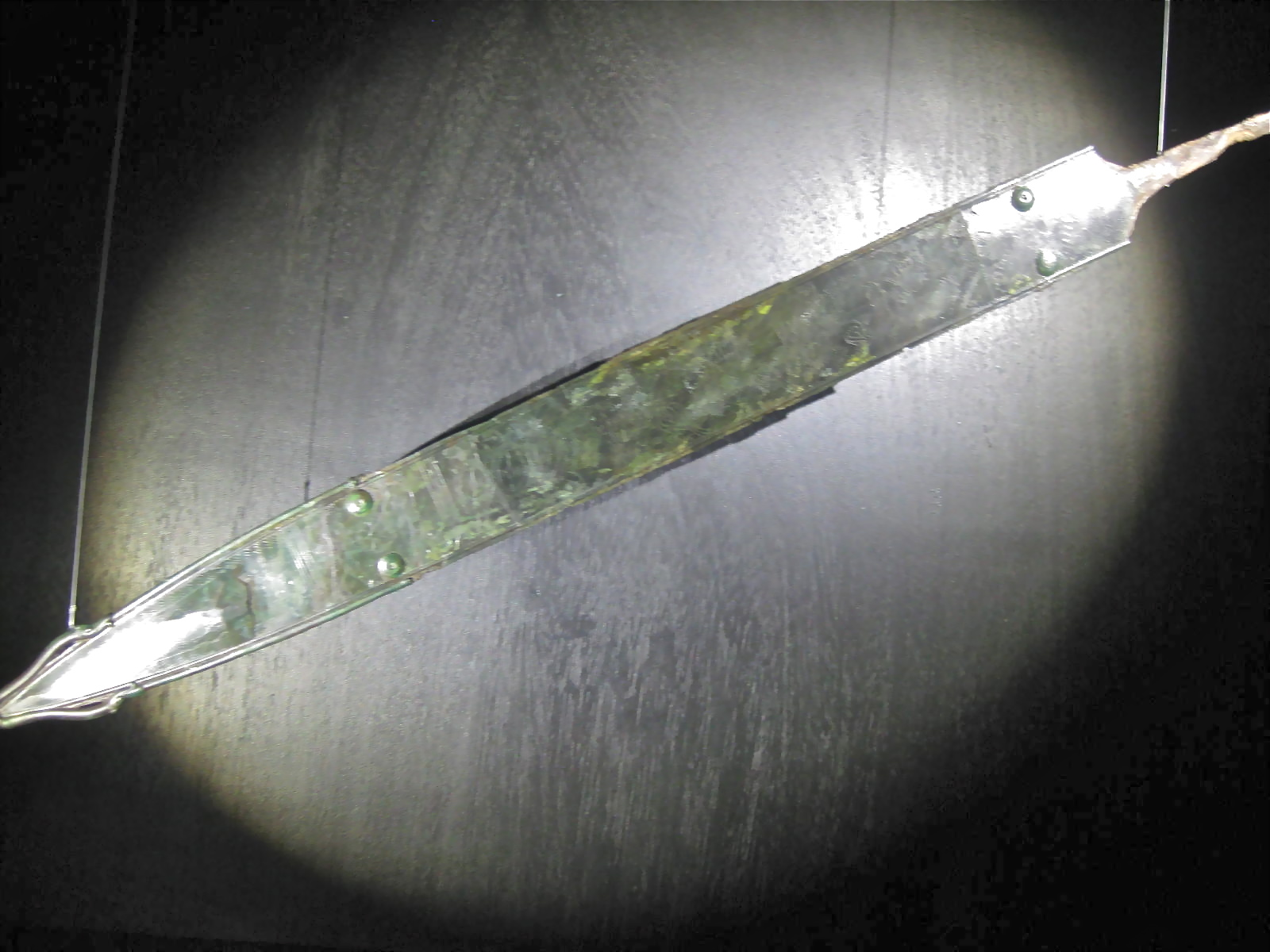
Early La Tène sword from Hallstatt Grave 994

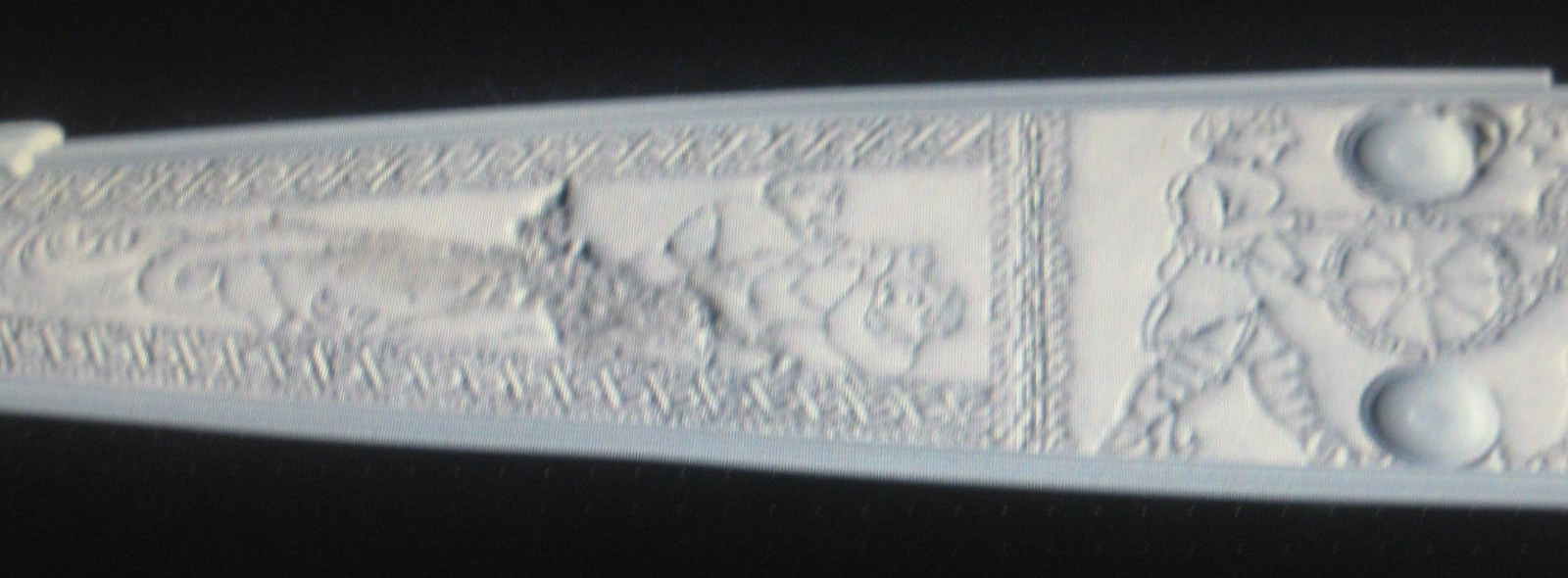
Early La Tène sword from Hallstatt Grave 994: Engraved pictures of horsemen and foot soldiers; part of a late rich burial (c. 450–400 BC)

=== Bronze buckets, situla, and bowls ===
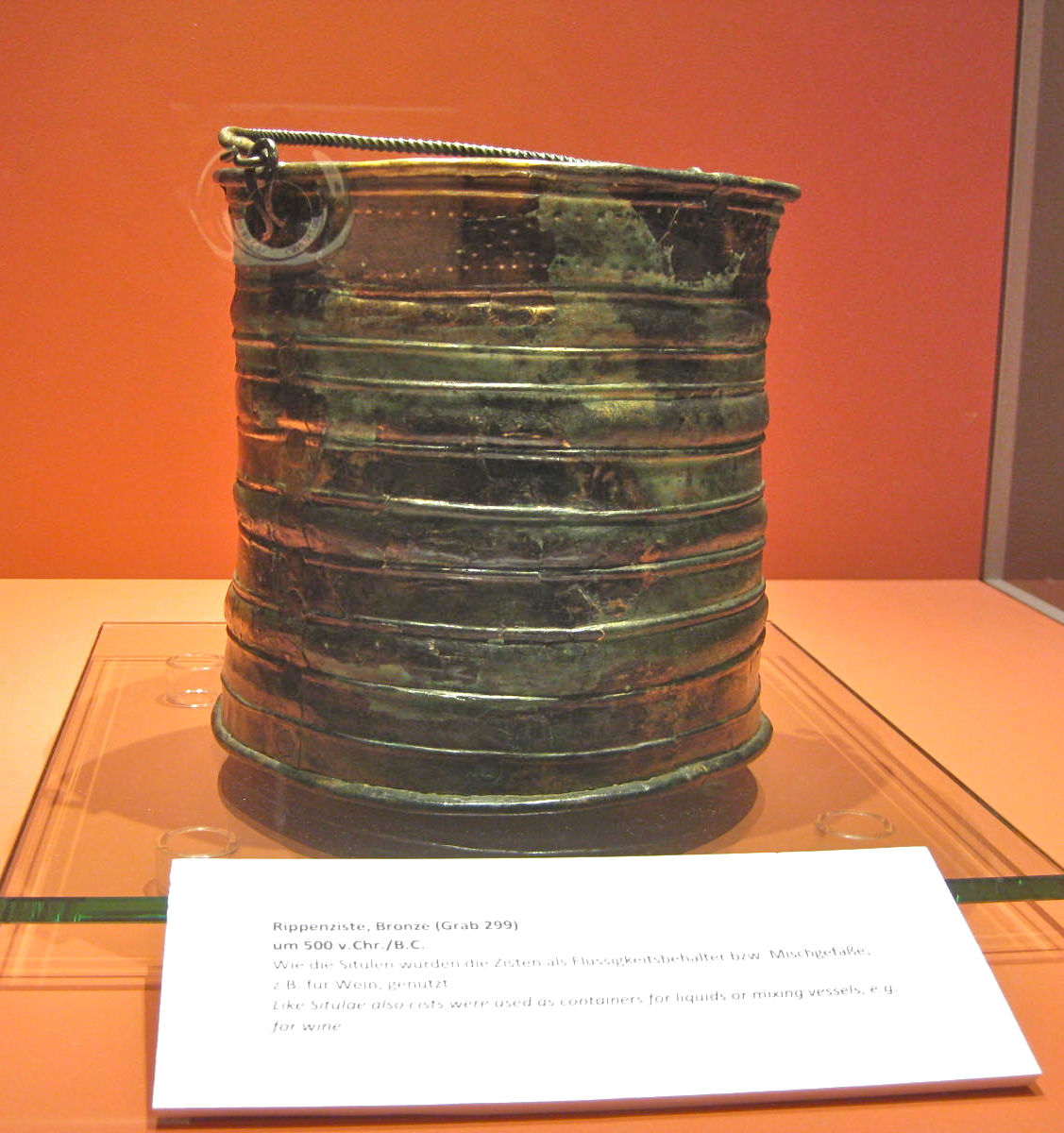
Double handled bucket

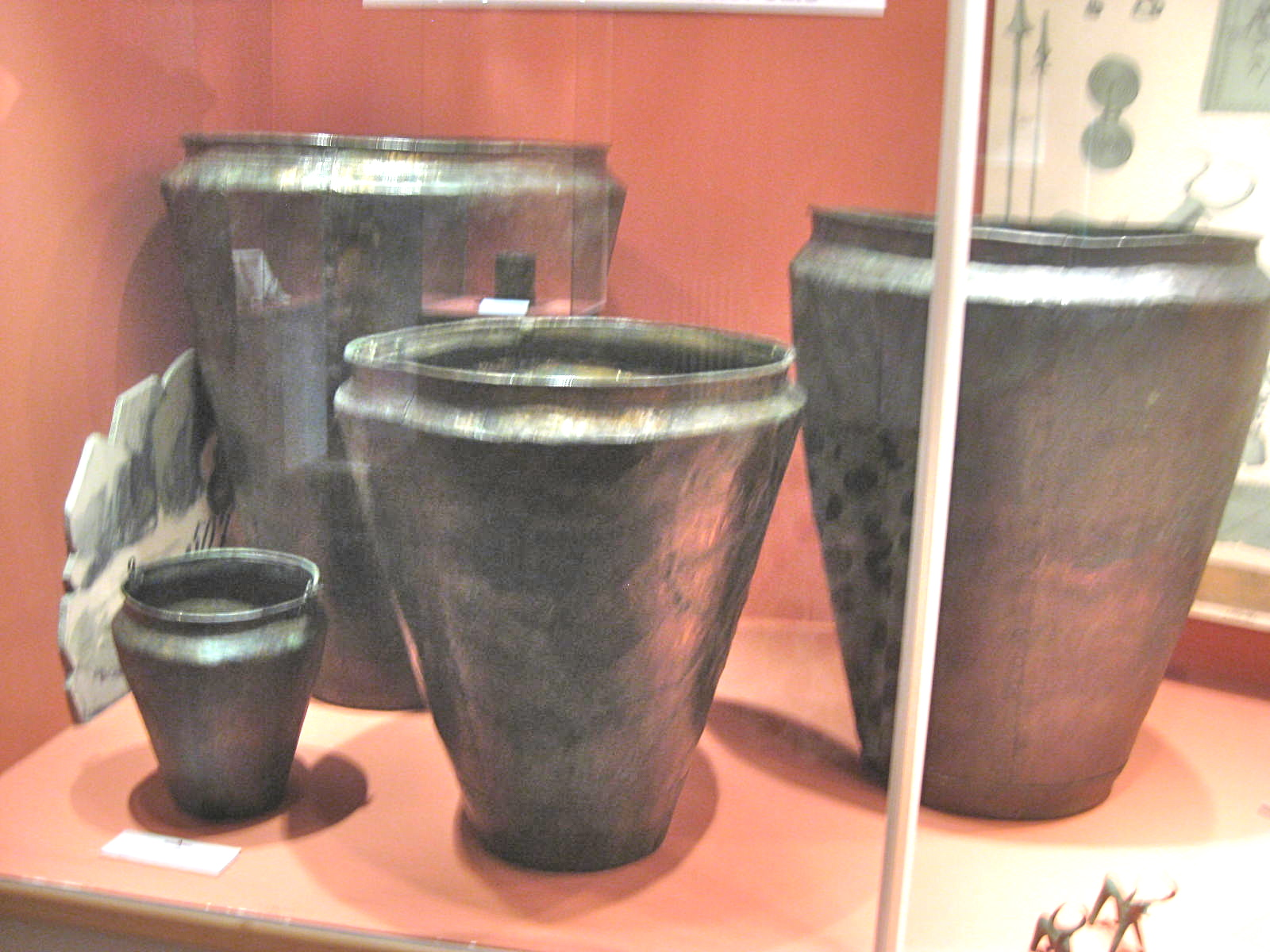
Situla

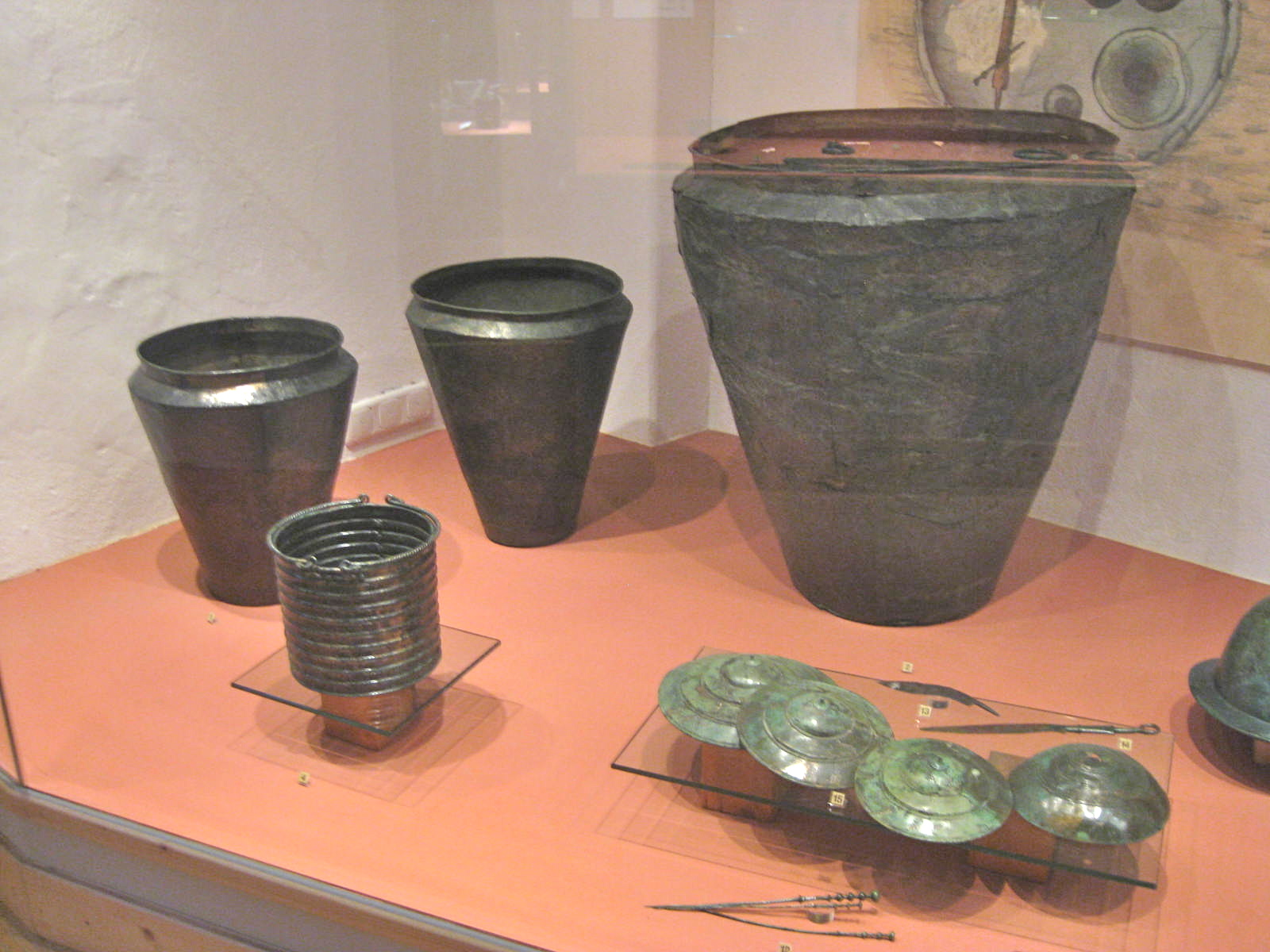
Museum Hallstatt 31

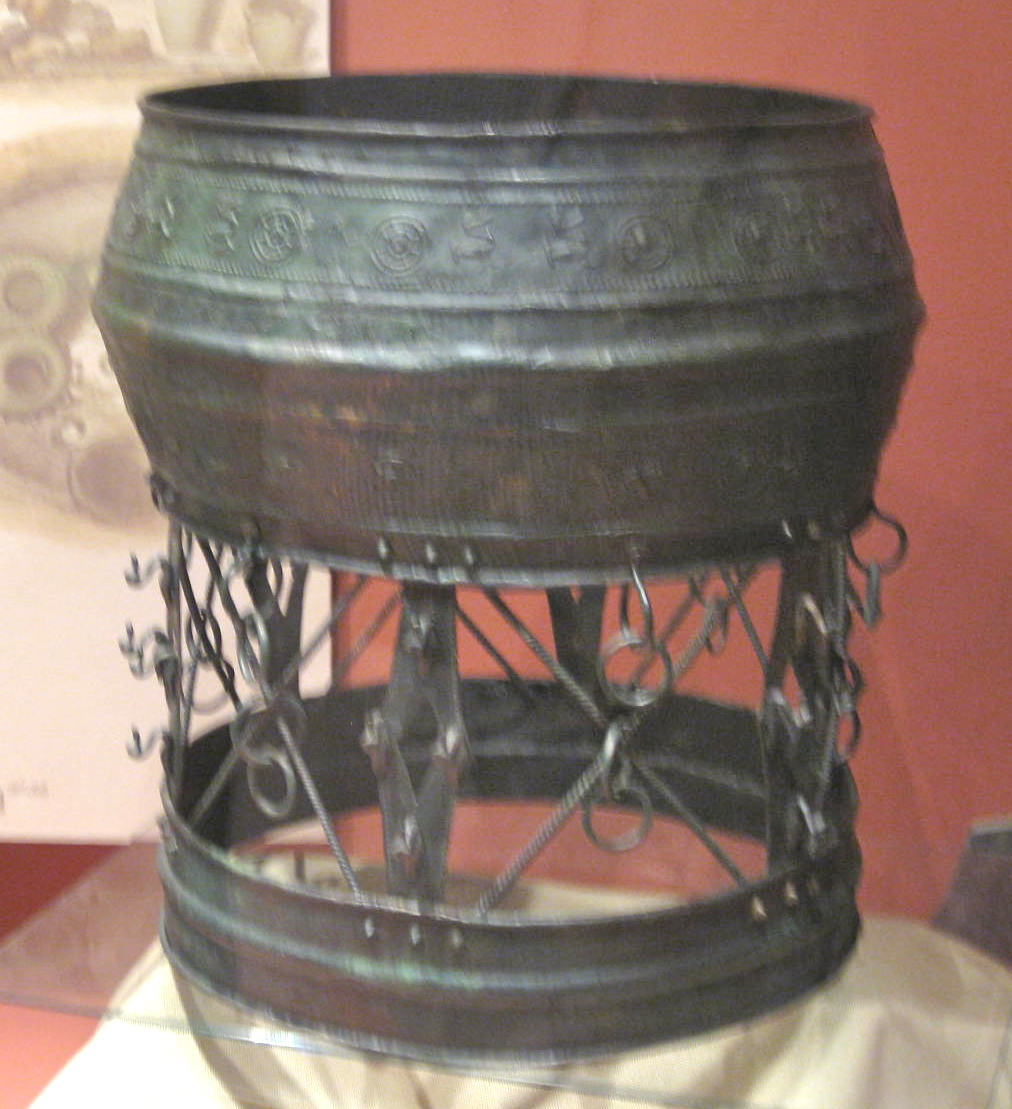
Museum Hallstatt 26

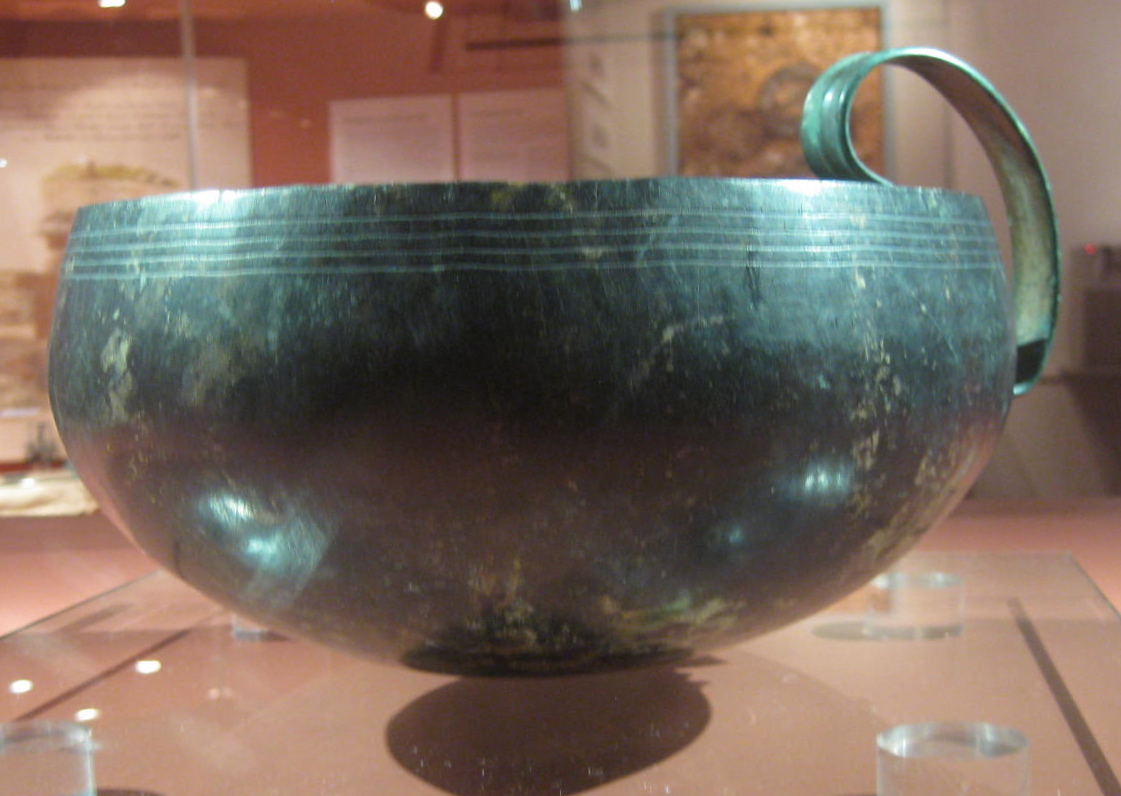
Museum Hallstatt 29

=== Pottery ===
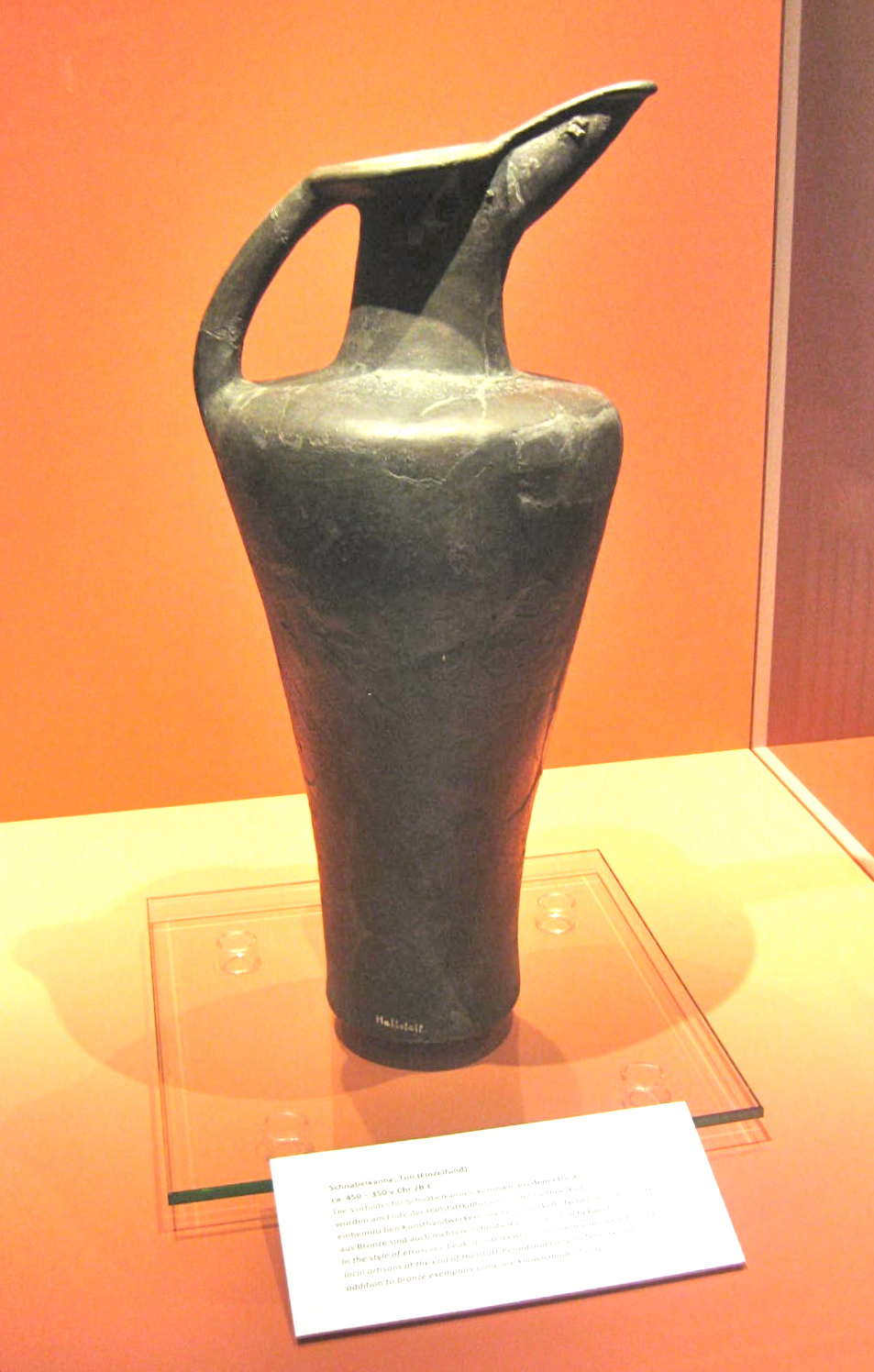
Museum Hallstatt 20: Pottery beaked vessel

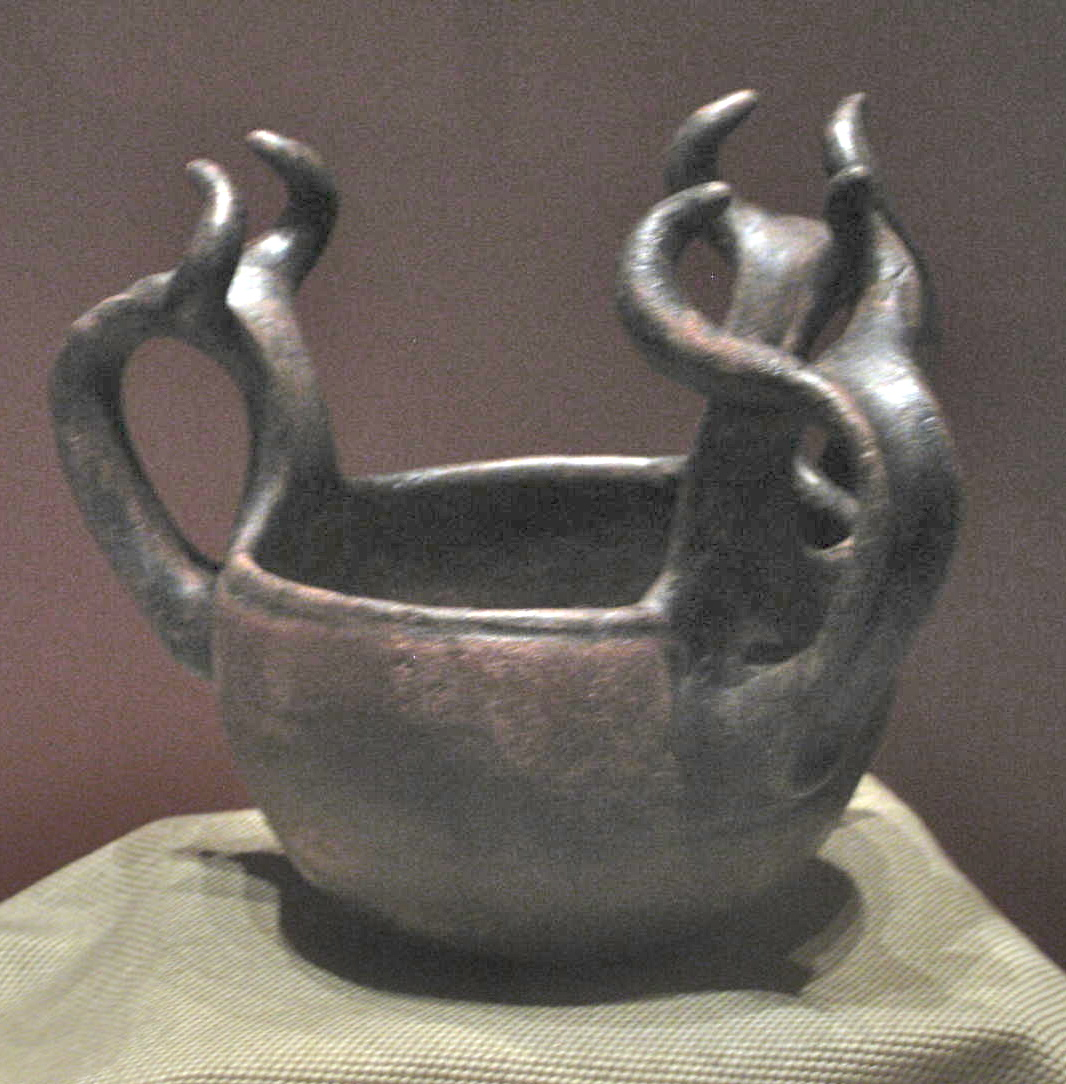
Museum Hallstatt 36

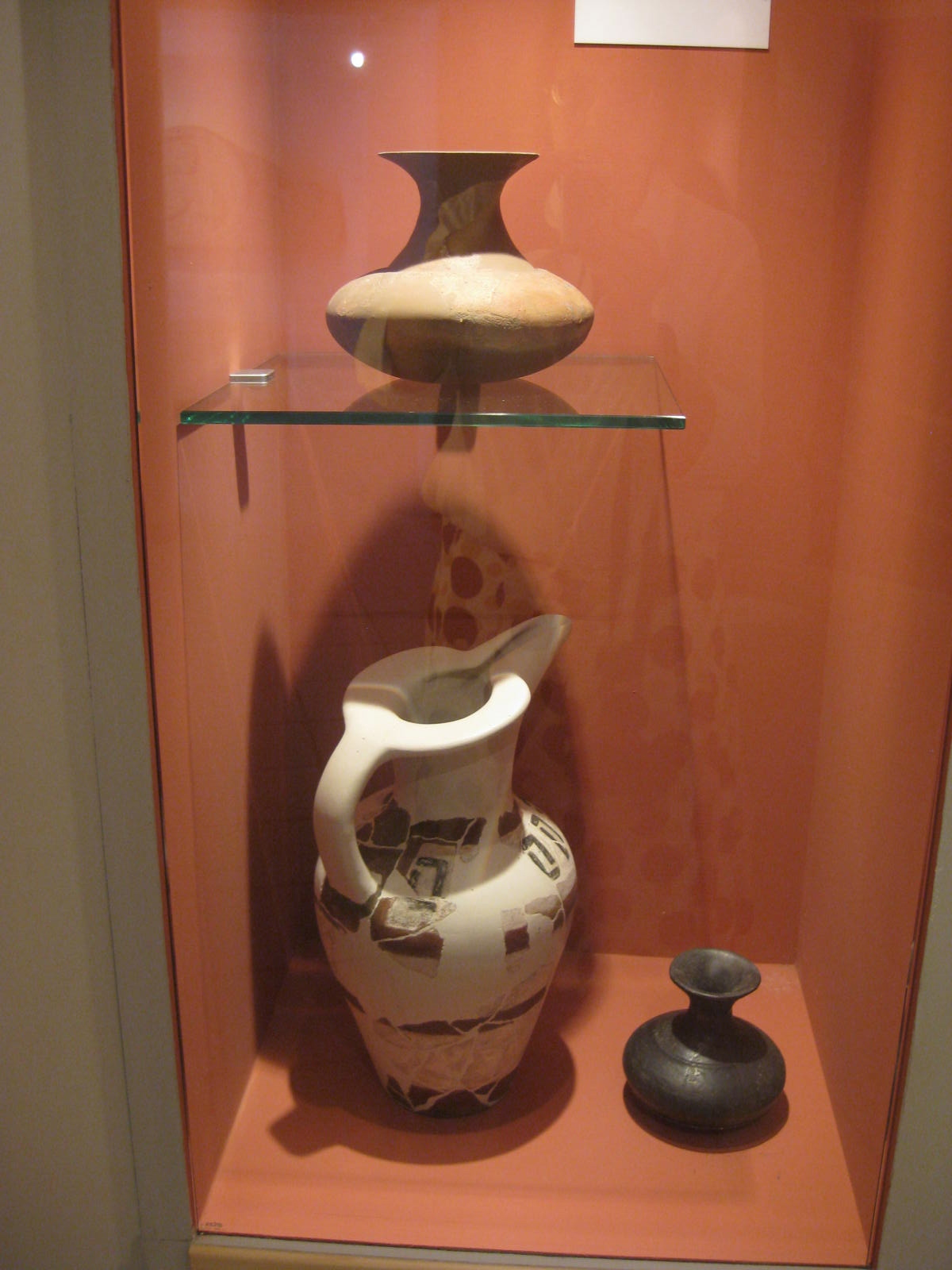
Museum Hallstatt 18

=== Brooches and personal ornaments ===
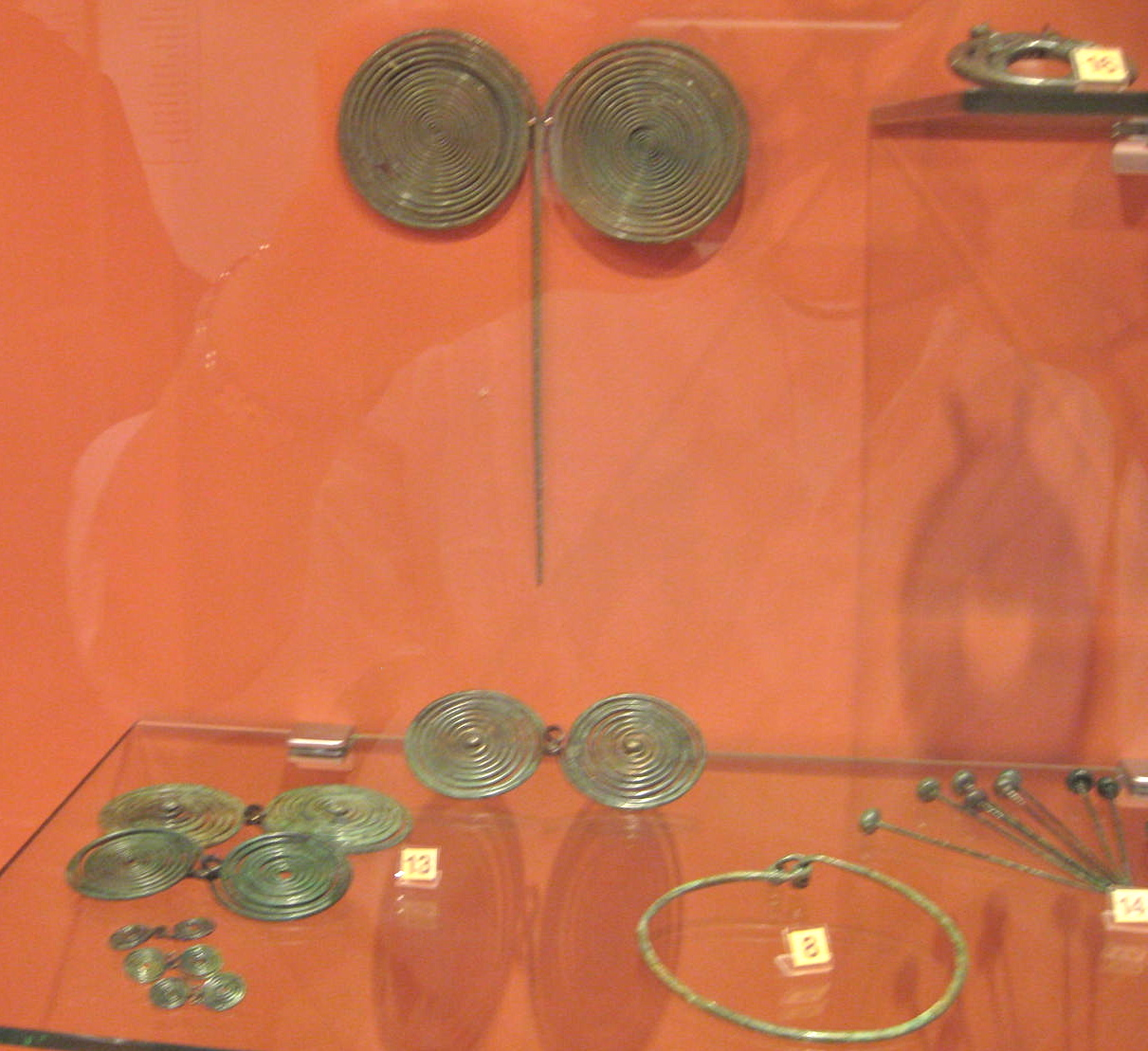
Late Urnfield spiral pins and fibula

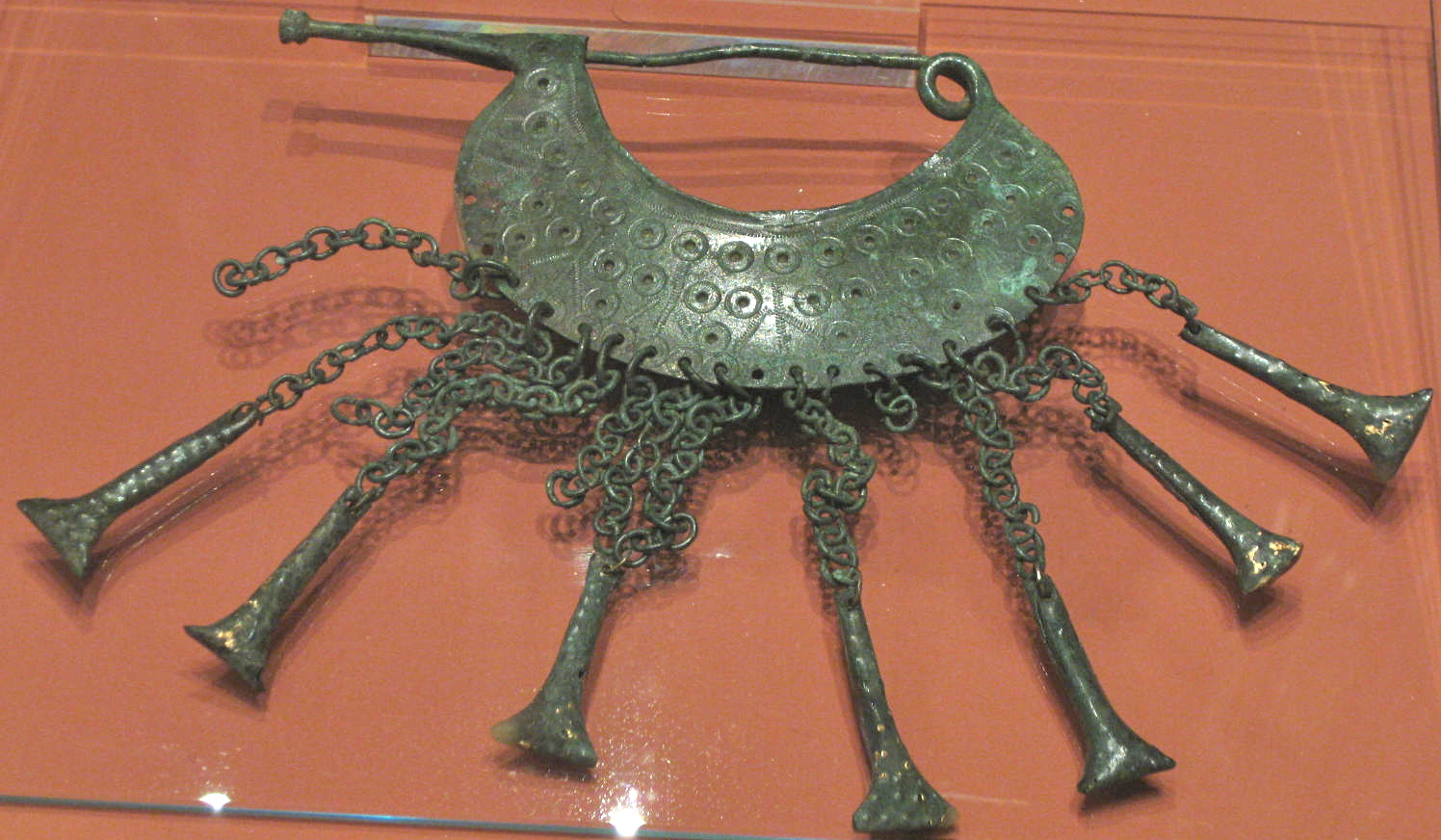
Museum Hallstatt 38

=== Roman remains ===
Museum Hallstatt also has an extensive collection of Roman artefacts. These suggests that during the Roman period salt mining was recommenced on a considerable scale and monumental stone buildings were constructed. An impressive stone pediment is on display in the museum. In 1987, extensive remains of a stone building were found when the Janu Sports Store was built, and these are available for public view. The Roman finds include several fine Samian ware bowls.

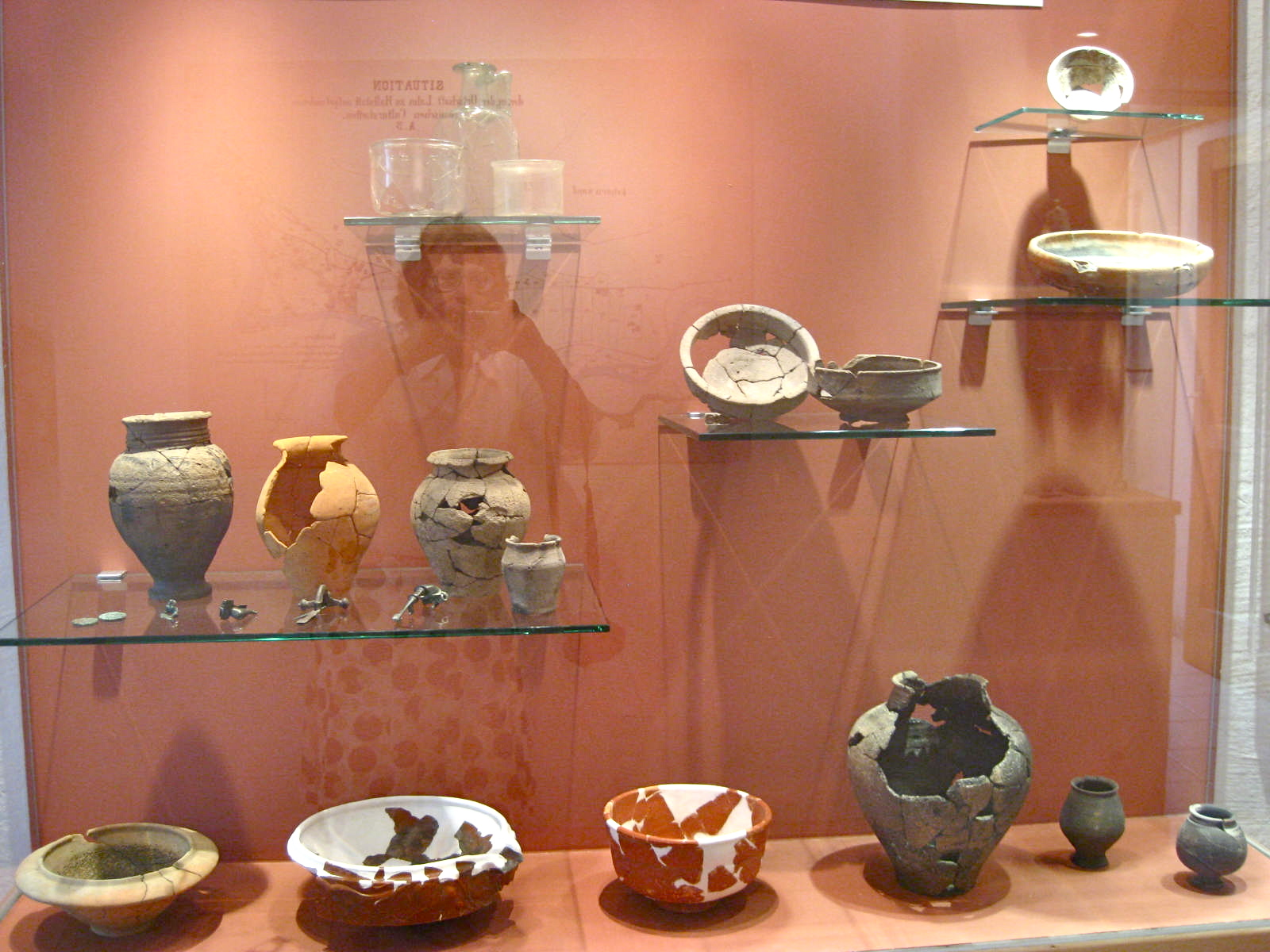
Roman glass, brooches, and pottery finds

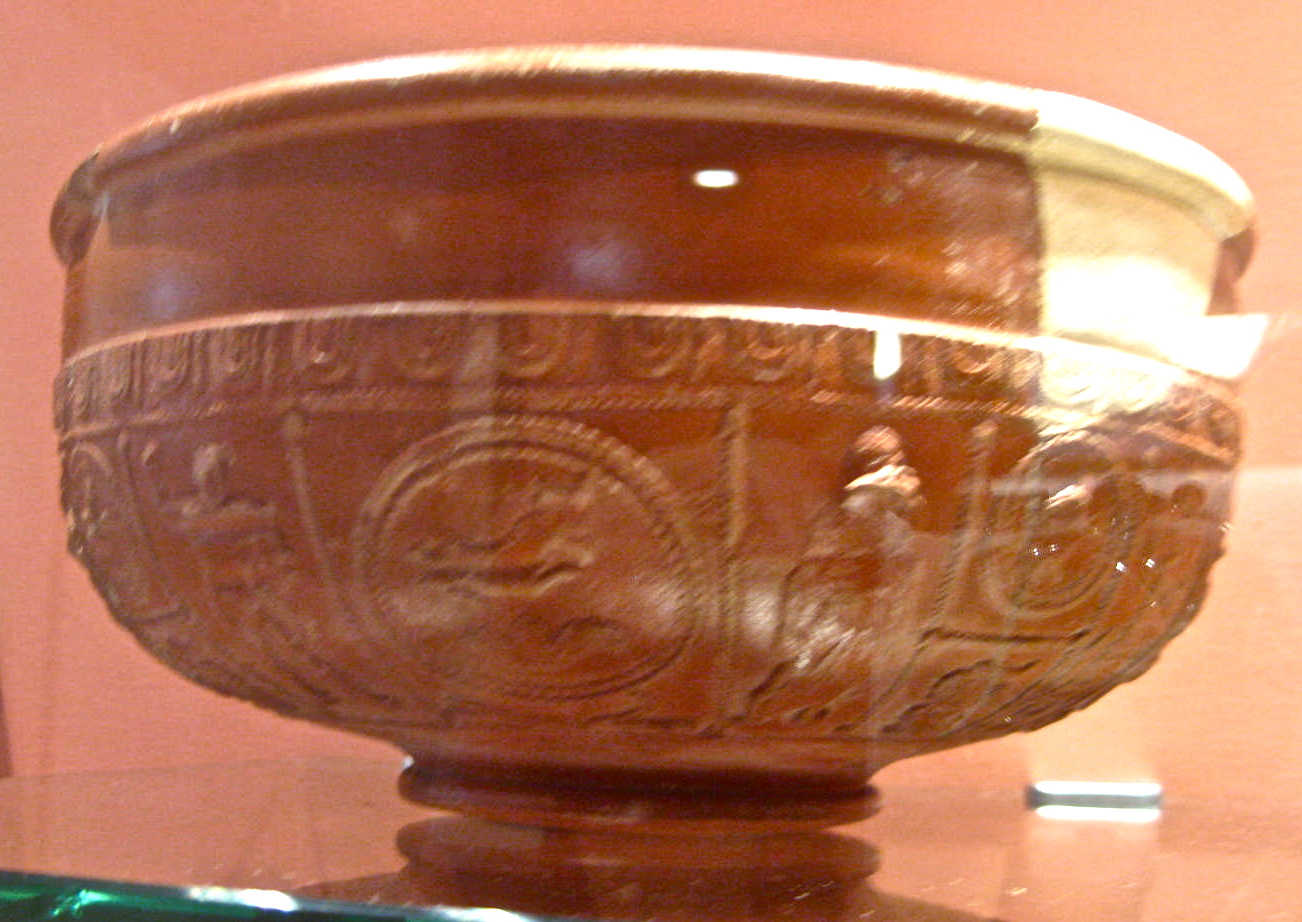
Roman Samian ware bowl (probably late 1st century AD)

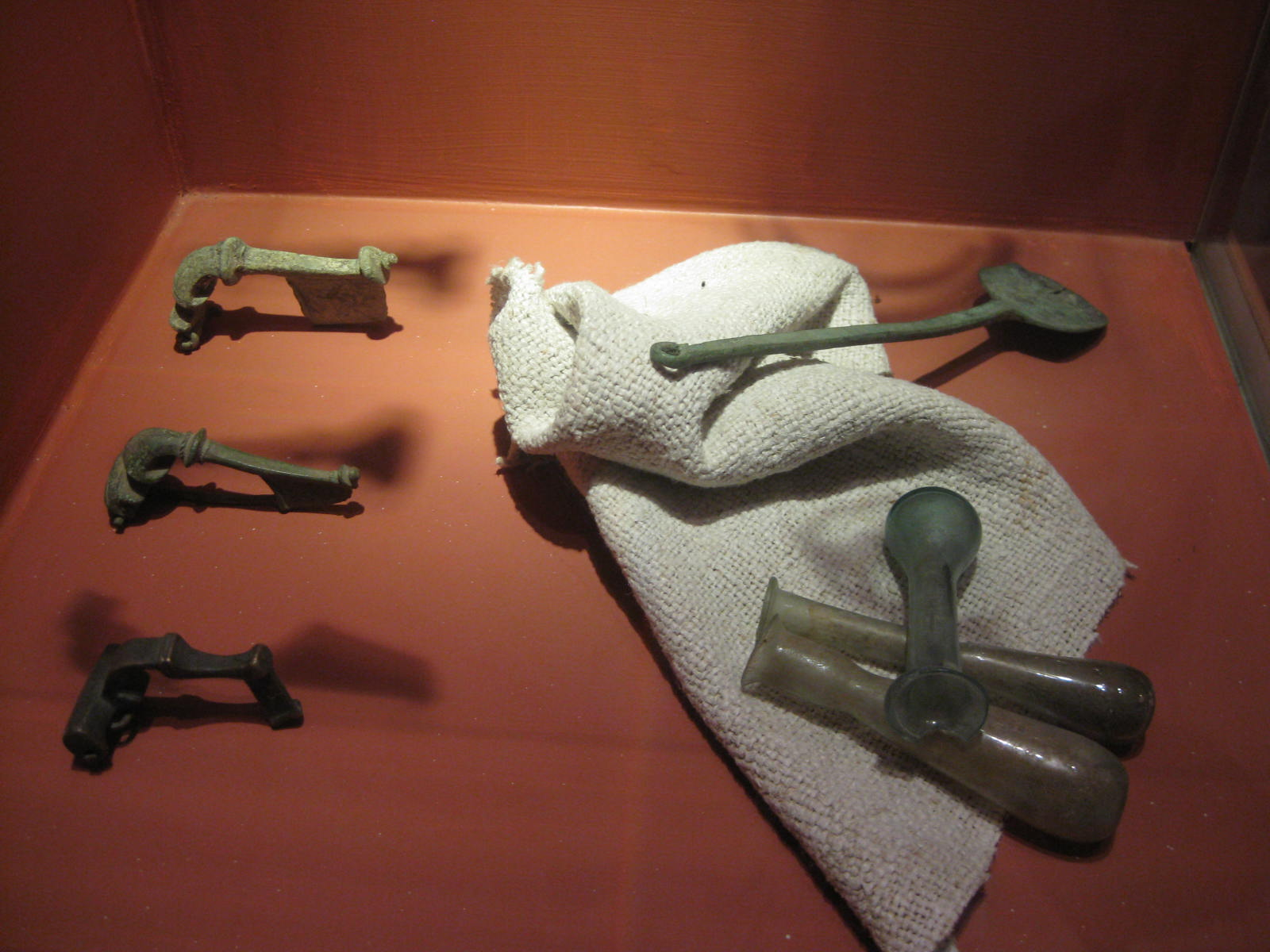
Roman fibulae or brooches

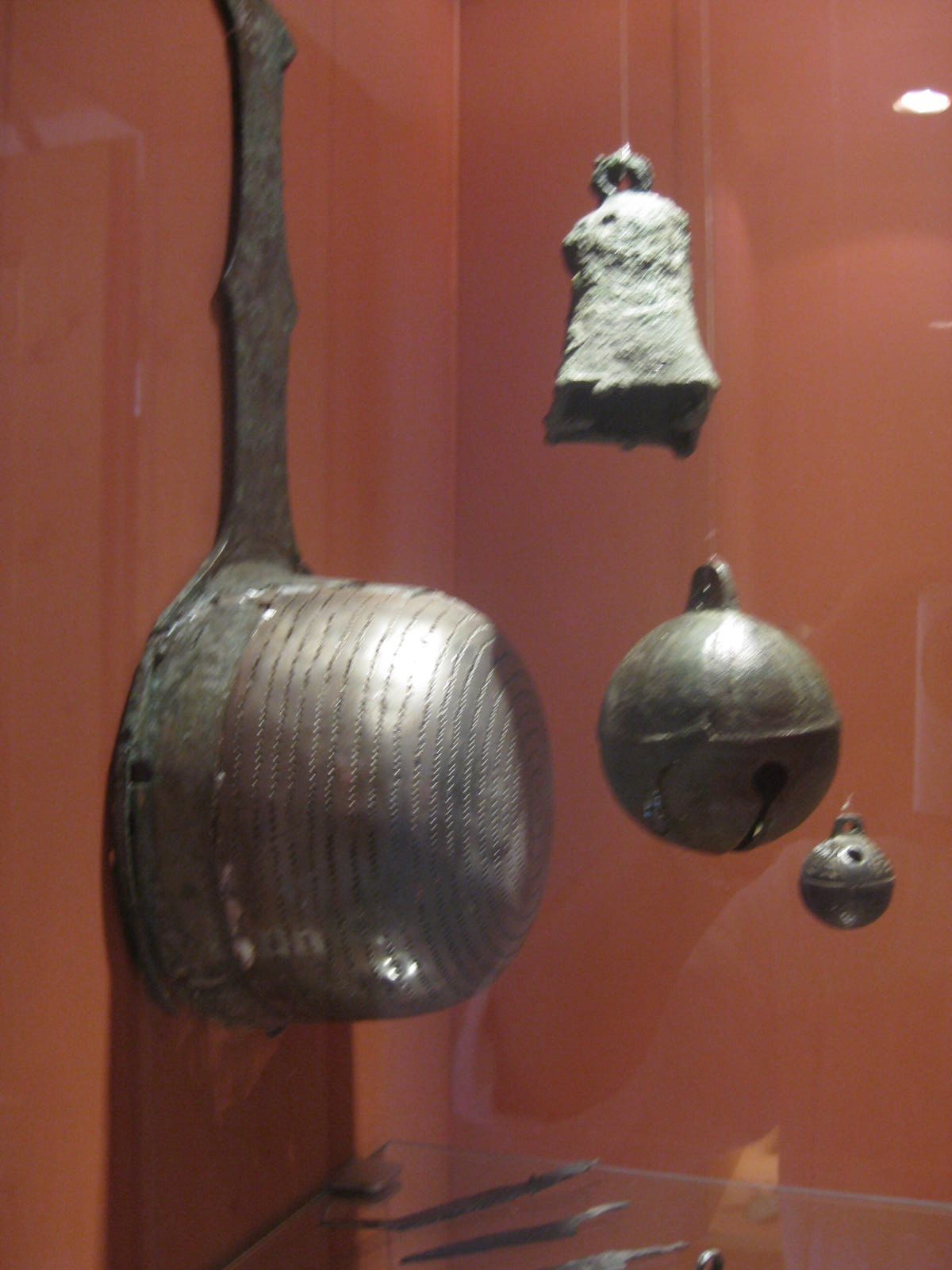
Roman bronze sieve or colander, 2nd century AD. Globular bells may be much later.

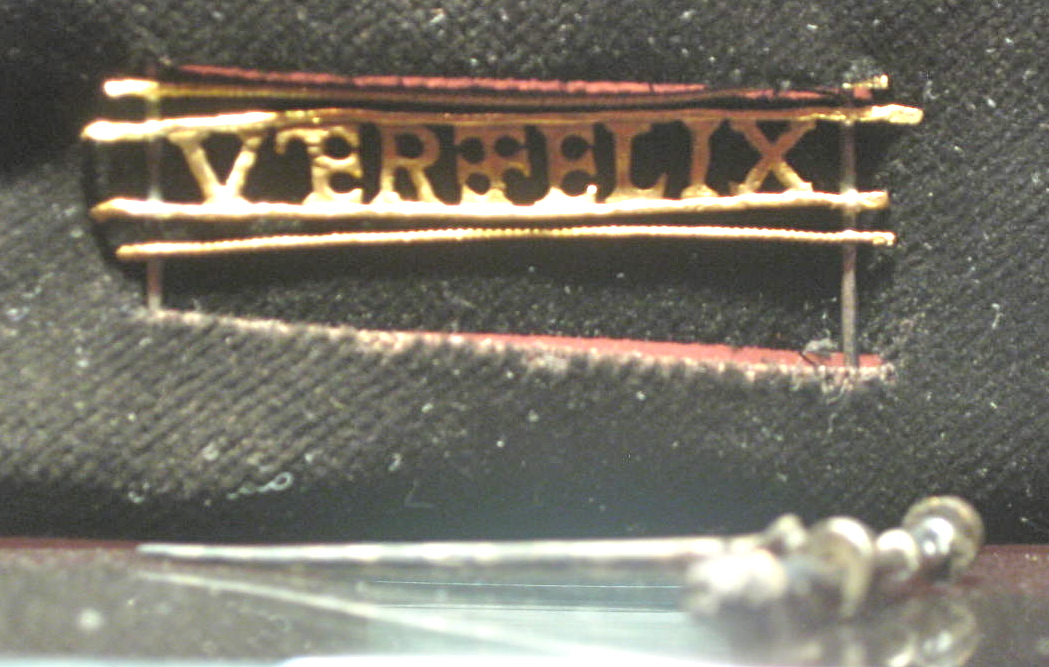
Roman brooches, one inscribed UETERE FELIX 'Use-this-happily'

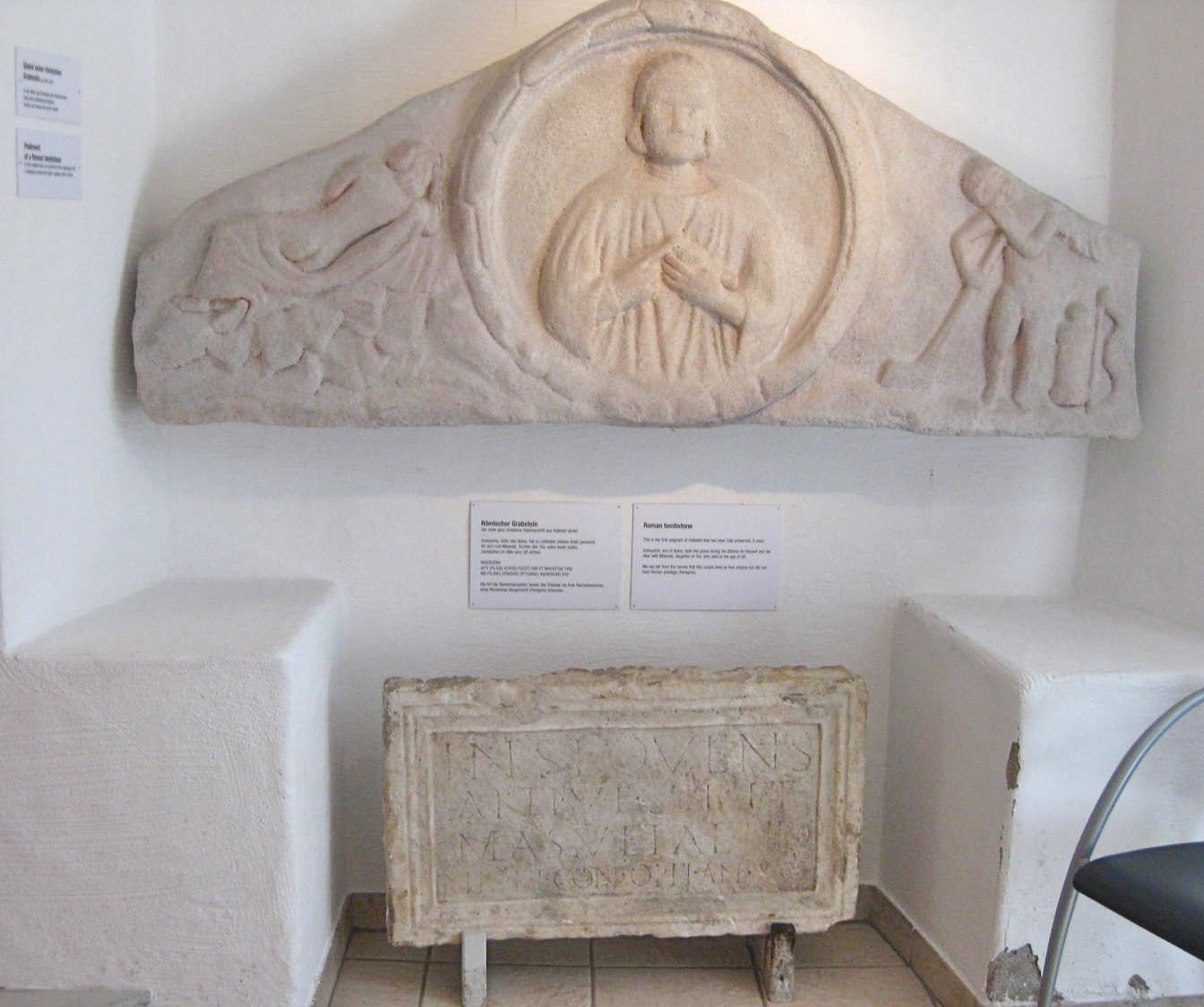
Museum Hallstatt. Carved lintel and inscrbed tombstone.

== See also ==
- Celts
- Keltenmuseum, Hallein
- Hochdorf Chieftain's Grave
- Heuneburg
- Glauberg
- Oppidum of Manching
- Oppidum
- Vix and Mont Lassois
