= Johann Georg Ramsauer =

Austrian mine operator

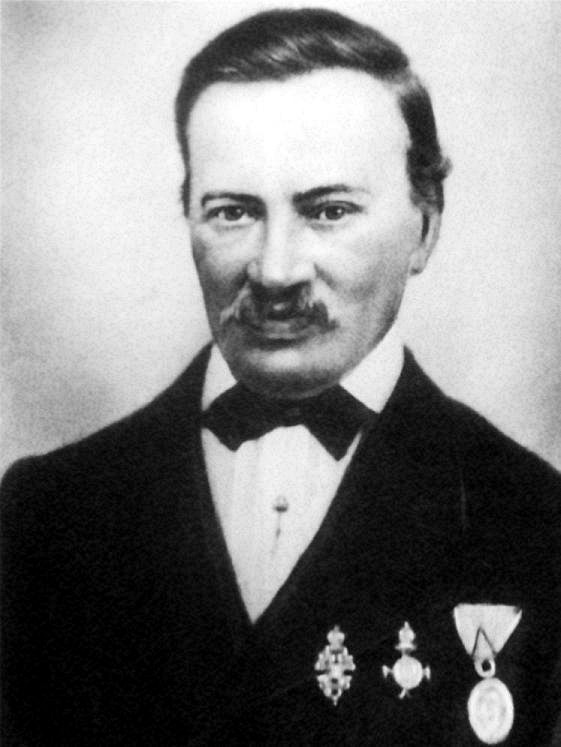
- Born: 7 March 1795; Hallstatt, Upper Austria
- Died: 14 December 1874 (aged 79); Linz, Austria
- Education: apprenticeships
- Occupation(s): Bergmeister, Archaeologist

Johann Georg Ramsauer (7 March 1795 in Hallstatt – 14 December 1874 in Linz) was an Austrian mine operator and the director of the excavations at the Hallstatt cemetery from 1846 to 1863. He spent his life working for the state service of the mines, moving from an apprentice to Bergmeister. During this time, he lived in the Rudolfsturm, a medieval fortress, where he raised 24 children. He kept comprehensive field notes, including magnificent watercolor drawings of grave arrangements and artefacts, which were never published but rather became the protocol manuscripts.

== Bibliography ==
- Hodson, F.R. (1990). Hallstatt: The Ramsauer Graves. R. Habelt. ISBN 3-7749-2460-0.
