= Cérilly =

Cérilly may refer to the following places in France:

- Cérilly, Allier, a commune in the department of Allier
- Cérilly, Côte-d'Or, a commune in the department of Côte-d'Or
- Cérilly, Yonne, a commune in the department of Yonne
