= Cérilly, Côte-d'Or =

Cérilly
- Commune
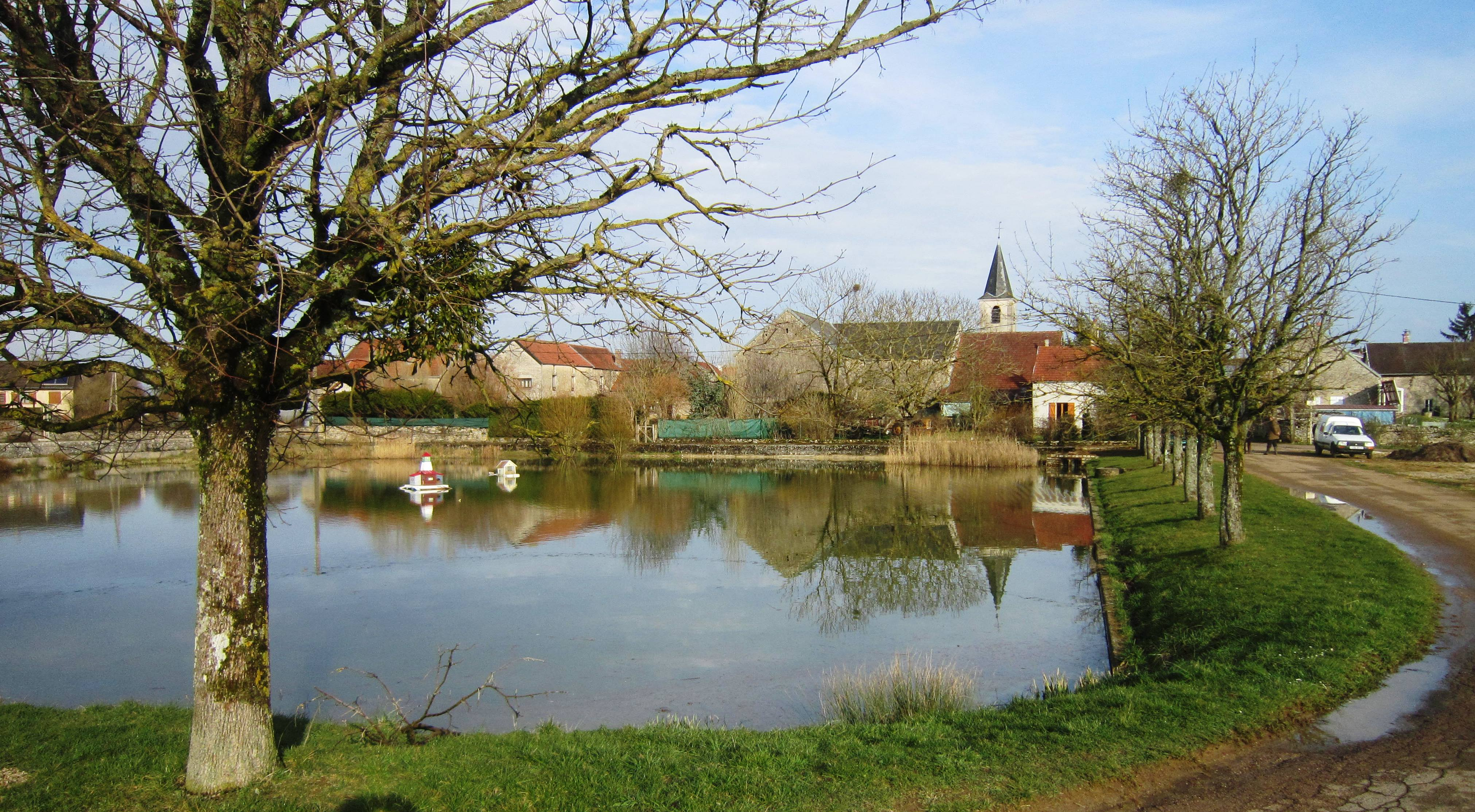
- The lake in Cérilly
- Location of Cérilly
- Location within France Location within Bourgogne-Franche-Comté
- Coordinates: 47°51′59″N 4°29′48″E
- Country: France
- Region: Bourgogne-Franche-Comté
- Department: Côte-d'Or
- Arrondissement: Montbard
- Canton: Châtillon-sur-Seine

Government
  - Mayor (2020–2026): Christophe Pinel
- Area^{1}: 13.9 km^{2} (5.4 sq mi)
- Elevation: 228 m (748 ft)
- Highest elevation: 273 m (896 ft)
- Lowest elevation: 214 m (702 ft)
- Population (2023): 214
  - Density: 15.4/km^{2} (39.9/sq mi)
- Time zone: UTC+01:00 (CET)
  - Summer (DST): UTC+02:00 (CEST)
- INSEE/Postal code: 21125 /21330
- ^{1} French Land Register data, which excludes lakes, ponds, glaciers > 1 km^{2} (0.386 sq mi or 247 acres) and river estuaries.

Cérilly (French pronunciation: [seʁiji]) is a commune in the Côte-d'Or department in eastern France.

== Population ==
Historical population
Year	Pop.	±% p.a.
1968	247	—
1975	252	+0.29%
1982	268	+0.88%
1990	247	−1.01%
1999	242	−0.23%
2007	252	+0.51%
2012	263	+0.86%
2017	231	−2.56%
2023	214	−1.27%
Source: INSEE

== See also ==
- Communes of the Côte-d'Or department
