= Hallstatt culture =

Archaeological culture in Europe

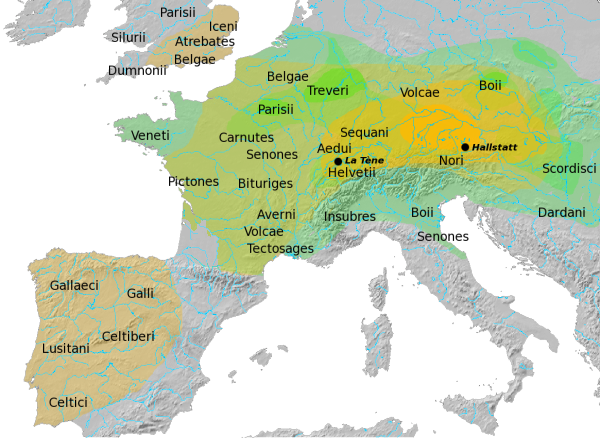
- Geographical range: Continental Europe
- Period: Late Bronze Age, Early Iron Age
- Dates: 1200 – 450 BC; Hallstatt A (1200 – 1050 BC); Hallstatt B (1050 – 800 BC); Hallstatt C (800 – 650 BC); Hallstatt D (620 – 450 BC)
- Type site: Hallstatt
- Preceded by: Urnfield culture
- Followed by: La Tène culture

The Hallstatt culture was the predominant Western and Central European archaeological culture of the Late Bronze Age from the 12th to 8th centuries BC (Hallstatt A, Hallstatt B) and Early Iron Age Europe from the 8th to 6th centuries BC (Hallstatt C, Hallstatt D), developing out of the Urnfield culture of the 12th century BC (Late Bronze Age) and followed in much of its area by the La Tène culture. It is commonly associated with Proto-Celtic speaking populations.

It is named for its type site, Hallstatt, a lakeside village in the Austrian Salzkammergut southeast of Salzburg, where there was a rich salt mine, and some 1,300 burials are known, many with fine artifacts. Material from Hallstatt has been classified into four periods, designated "Hallstatt A" to "D". Hallstatt A and B are regarded as Late Bronze Age with later Iron Age Hallstatt C and D more generalised under widely encompassing terms such as "Hallstatt culture", or "period", "style" and so on.

By the 6th century BC, it had expanded to include wide territories, falling into two zones, east and west, between them covering much of western and central Europe down to the Alps, and extending into northern Italy. Parts of Britain and Iberia are included in the ultimate expansion of the culture.

The culture was based on farming, but metal-working was considerably advanced, and by the end of the period long-range trade within the area and with Mediterranean cultures was economically significant. Social distinctions became increasingly important, with emerging elite classes of chieftains and warriors, and perhaps those with other skills. Society is thought to have been organized on a tribal basis, though very little is known about this. Settlement size was generally small, although a few of the largest settlements, like Heuneburg in the south of Germany, evolved into towns rather than villages by modern standards. However, at the end of the period these seem to have been overthrown or abandoned.

== Chronology ==
According to Paul Reinecke's time-scheme from 1902, the end of the Bronze Age and the Early Iron Age were divided into four periods:

Bronze Age Central Europe
Bell Beaker	2600–2200 BC
Bz A	2200–1600 BC
Bz B	1600–1500 BC
Bz C	1500–1300 BC
Bz D	1300–1200 BC
Ha A	1200–1050 BC
Ha B	1050–800 BC
Iron Age Central Europe
Hallstatt
Ha C	800–620 BC
Ha D	620–450 BC
La Tène
LT A	450–380 BC
LT B	380–250 BC
LT C	250–150 BC
LT D	150–1 BC
Roman period
B	AD 1–150
C	AD 150–375

Bronze Age Urnfield culture:

- HaA (1200–1050 BC)
- HaB (1050-800 BC)

Early Iron Age Hallstatt culture:

- HaC (800-620 BC)
- HaD (620-450 BC)

Paul Reinecke based his chronological divisions on finds from the south of Germany.

By 1881 Otto Tischler had made analogies to the Iron Age in the Northern Alps based on finds of brooches from graves in the south of Germany.

=== Absolute dating ===
It has proven difficult to use radiocarbon dating for the Early Iron Age due to the so-called "Hallstatt-Plateau", a phenomenon where radiocarbon dates cannot be distinguished between 750 and 400 BC. There are workarounds however, such as the wiggle matching technique. Therefore, dating in this time-period has been based mainly on Dendrochronology and relative dating.

For the beginning of HaC, wood pieces from the Cart Grave of Wehringen (Landkreis Augsburg) deliver a solid dating in 778 ± 5 BC (Grave Barrow 8).

Despite missing an older Dendro-date for HaC, the convention remains that the Hallstatt period begins together with the arrival of the iron ore processing technology around 800 BC.

=== Relative dating ===
HaC is dated according to the presence of Mindelheim-type swords, binocular brooches, harp brooches, and arched brooches.

Based on the quickly changing fashions of brooches, it was possible to divide HaD into three stages (D1-D3). In HaD1 snake brooches are predominant, while in HaD2 drum brooches appear more often, and in HaD3 the double-drum and embellished foot brooches.

The transition to the La Tène period is often connected with the emergence of the first animal-shaped brooches, with Certosa-type and with Marzabotto-type brooches.

== Hallstatt type site ==
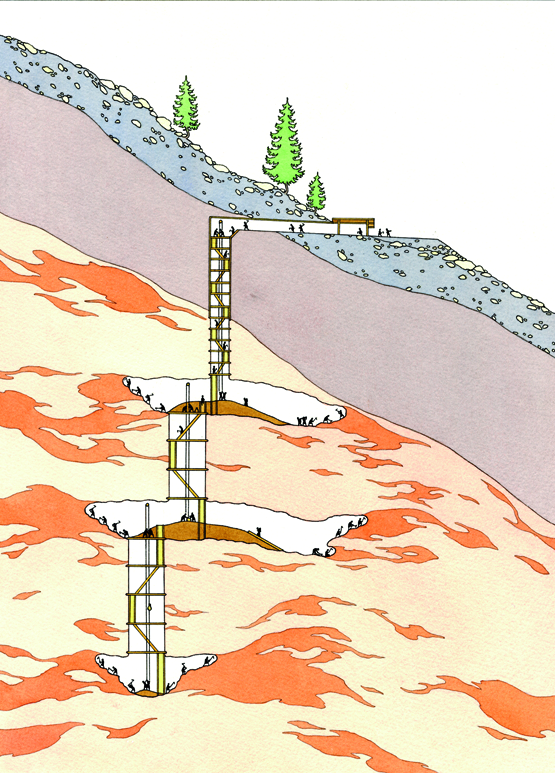
Section of the Hallstatt salt mine

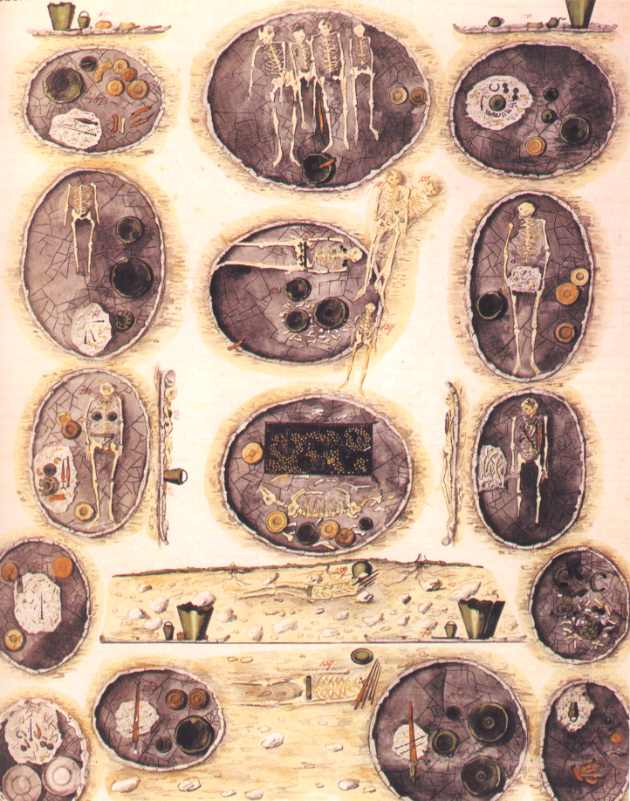
Documentation of the Hallstatt cemetery excavation, 19th century

The community at Hallstatt was untypical of the wider, mainly agricultural, culture, as its booming economy exploited the salt mines in the area. These had been worked from time to time since the Neolithic period, and in this period were extensively mined with a peak from the 8th to 5th centuries BC. The style and decoration of the grave goods found in the cemetery are very distinctive, and artifacts made in this style are widespread in Europe. In the mine workings themselves, the salt has preserved many organic materials such as textiles, wood and leather, and many abandoned artifacts such as shoes, pieces of cloth, and tools including miner's backpacks, have survived in good condition.

In 1846, Johann Georg Ramsauer (1795–1874) discovered a large prehistoric cemetery near Hallstatt, Austria (47.561°N 13.642°E), which he excavated during the second half of the 19th century. Eventually the excavation would yield 1,045 burials, although no settlement has yet been found. This may be covered by the later village, which has long occupied the whole narrow strip between the steep hillsides and the lake. Some 1,300 burials have been found, including around 2,000 individuals, with women and children but few infants. Nor is there a "princely" burial, as often found near large settlements. Instead, there are a large number of burials varying considerably in the number and richness of the grave goods, but with a high proportion containing goods suggesting a life well above subsistence level. It is now thought that at least most of these were not miners themselves, but from a richer class controlling the mines.

Finds at Hallstatt extend from about 1200 BC until around 500 BC, and are divided by archaeologists into four phases:

Hallstatt A–B (1200–800 BC) are part of the Bronze Age Urnfield culture. In this period, people were cremated and buried in simple graves. In phase B, tumulus (barrow or kurgan) burial becomes common, and cremation predominates. The "Hallstatt period" proper is restricted to HaC and HaD (800–450 BC), corresponding to the early European Iron Age. Hallstatt lies in the area where the western and eastern zones of the Hallstatt culture meet, which is reflected in the finds from there. Hallstatt D is succeeded by the La Tène culture.

Hallstatt C is characterized by the first appearance of iron swords mixed amongst the bronze ones. Inhumation and cremation co-occur. For the final phase, Hallstatt D, daggers, almost to the exclusion of swords, are found in western zone graves ranging from c. 600–500 BC. There are also differences in the pottery and brooches. Burials were mostly inhumations. Halstatt D has been further divided into the sub-phases D1–D3, relating only to the western zone, and mainly based on the form of brooches.

Major activity at the site appears to have finished about 500 BC, for reasons that are unclear. Many Hallstatt graves were robbed, probably at this time. There was widespread disruption throughout the western Hallstatt zone, and the salt workings had by then become very deep causing the focus of salt mining to shift to nearby Hallein Salt Mine, with graves at Dürrnberg where there are significant finds from the late Hallstatt and early La Tène periods - until the mid-4th century BC, when a major landslide destroyed the mineshafts and ended mining activity.

Much of the material from early excavations was dispersed, and is now found in many collections, especially German and Austrian museums, but the Hallstatt Museum in the town has the largest collection.

Finds from the Hallstatt site

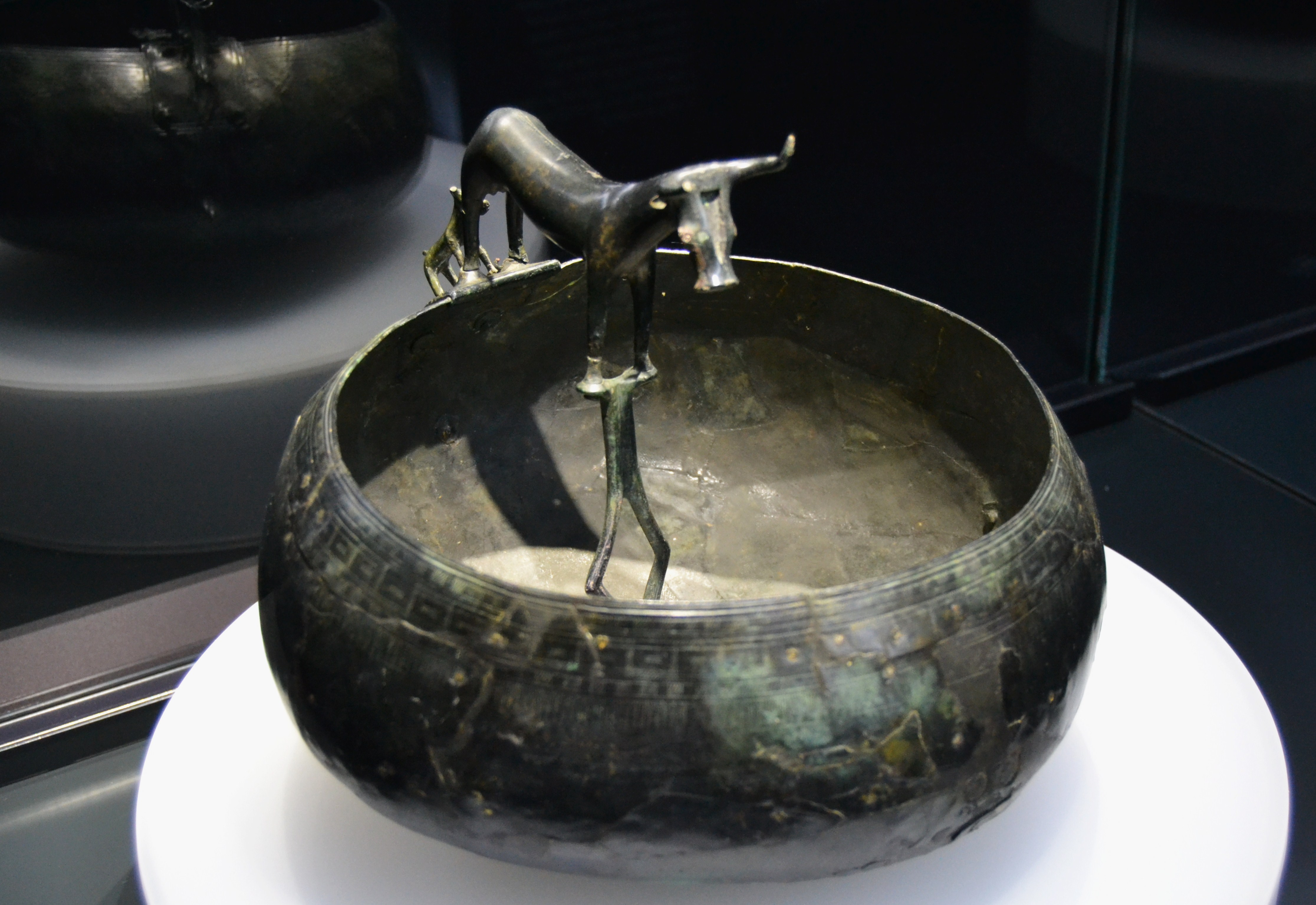
Bronze vessel with cow and calf decoration

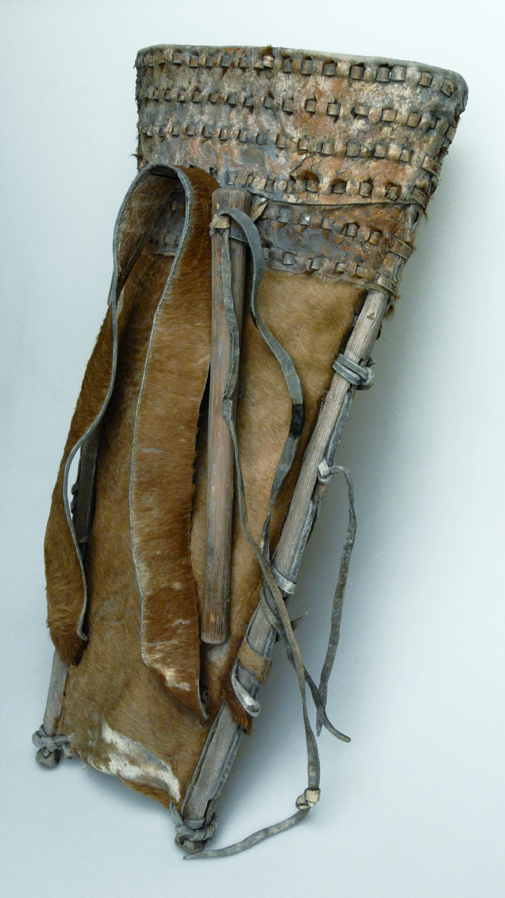
Wood and leather carrying pack from the mine

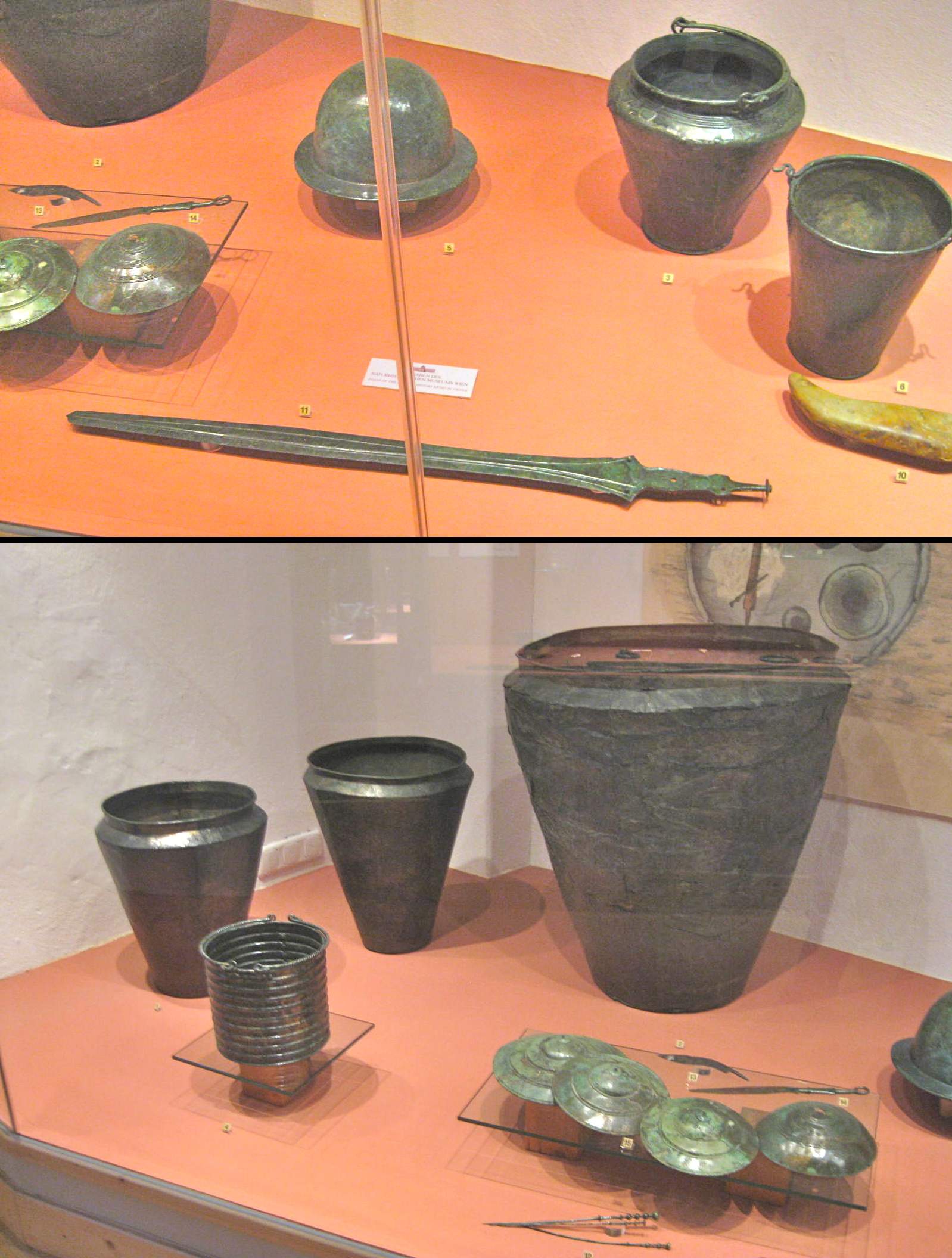
Bronze artefacts from Hallstatt

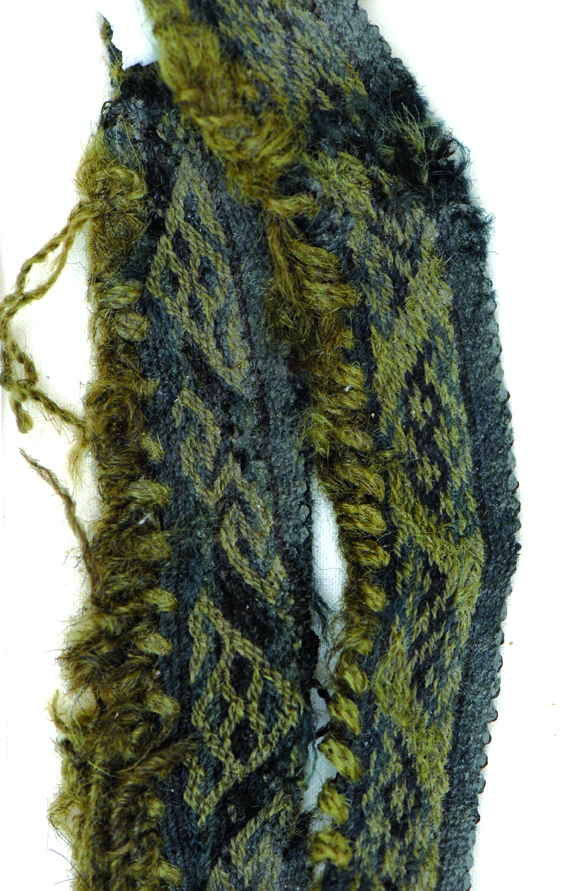
Textile fragment from the salt mine

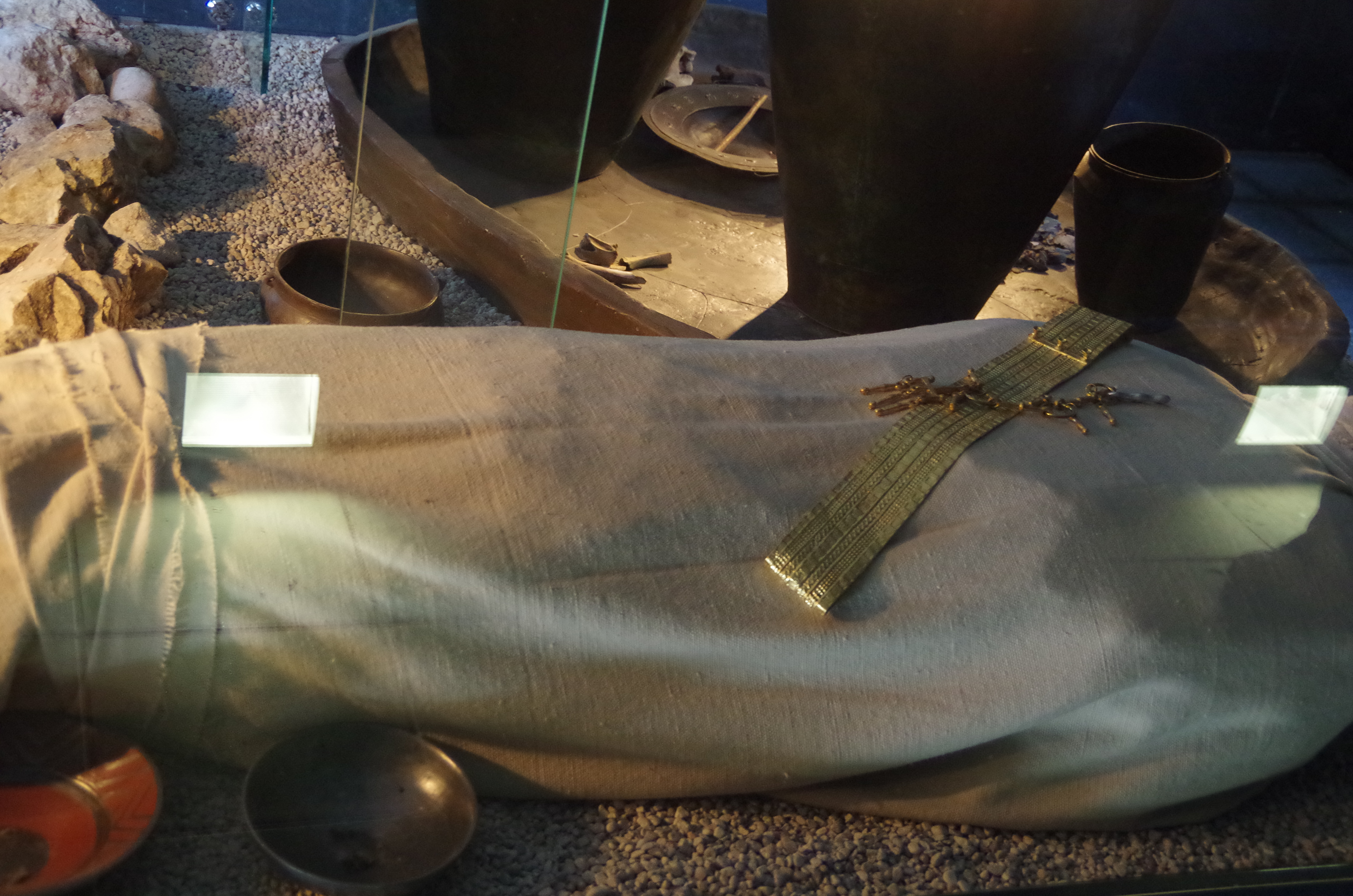
Hallstatt grave reconstruction

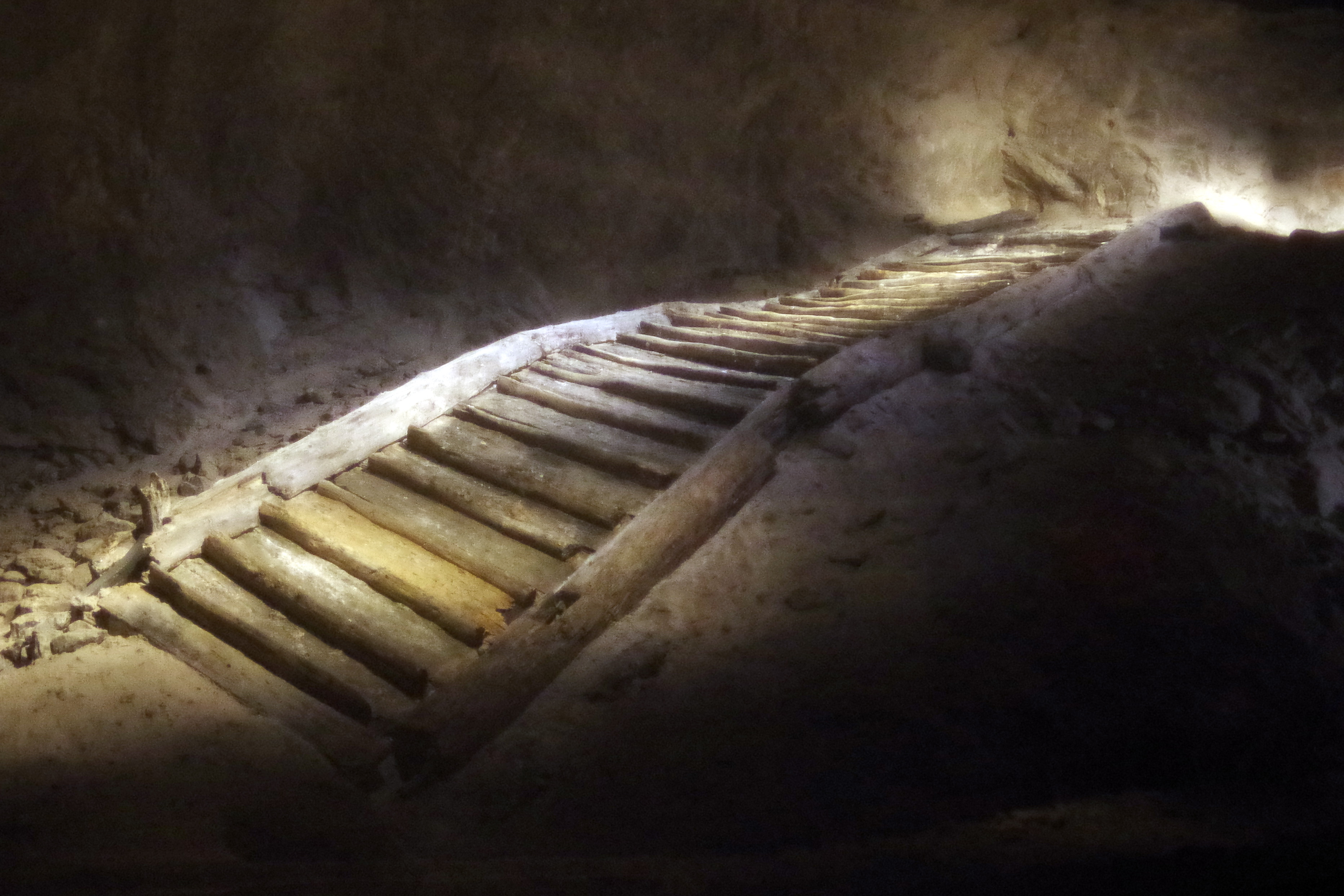
Preserved stairs from the Hallstatt mine, 1344 BC

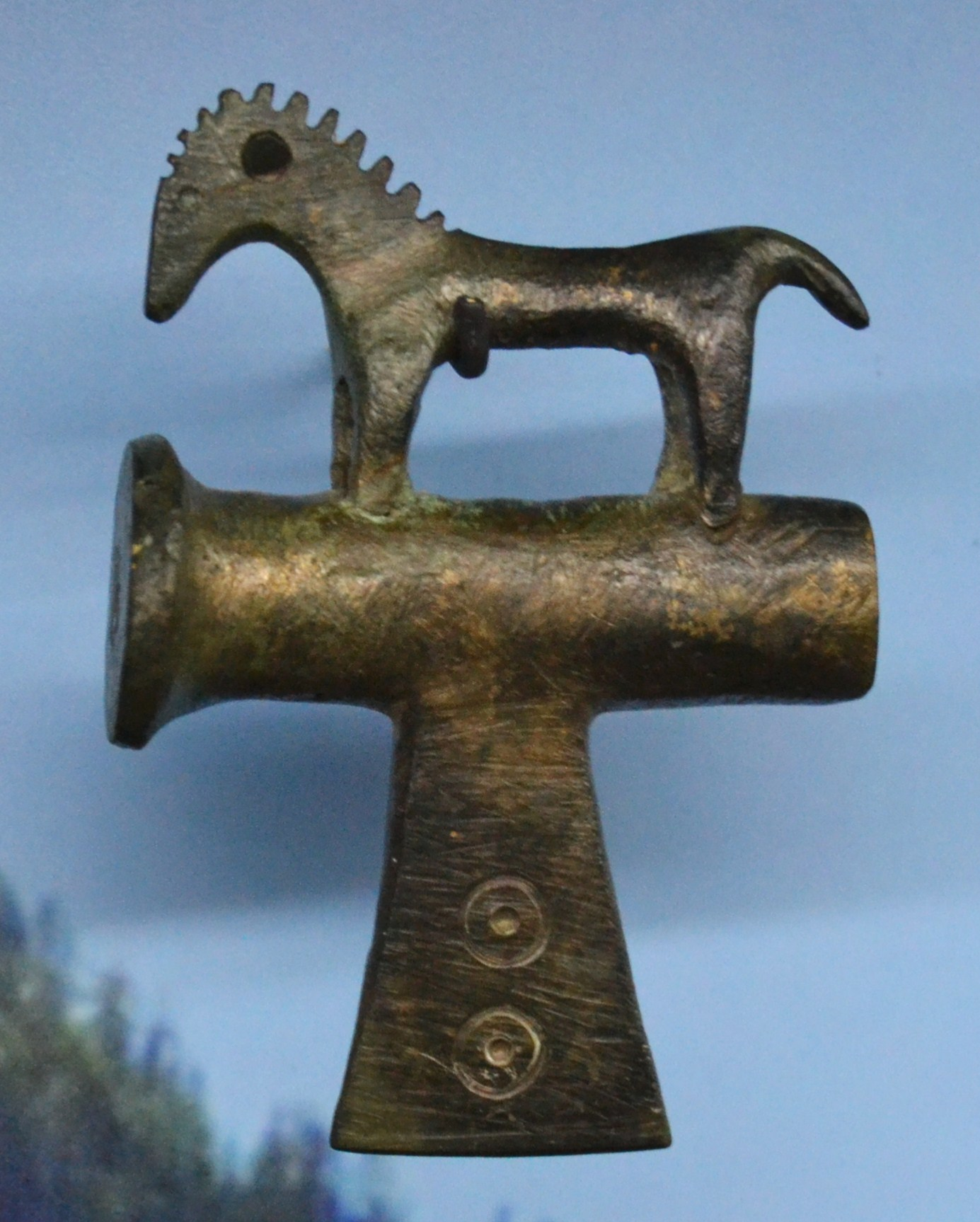
Ha C axehead, Hallstatt

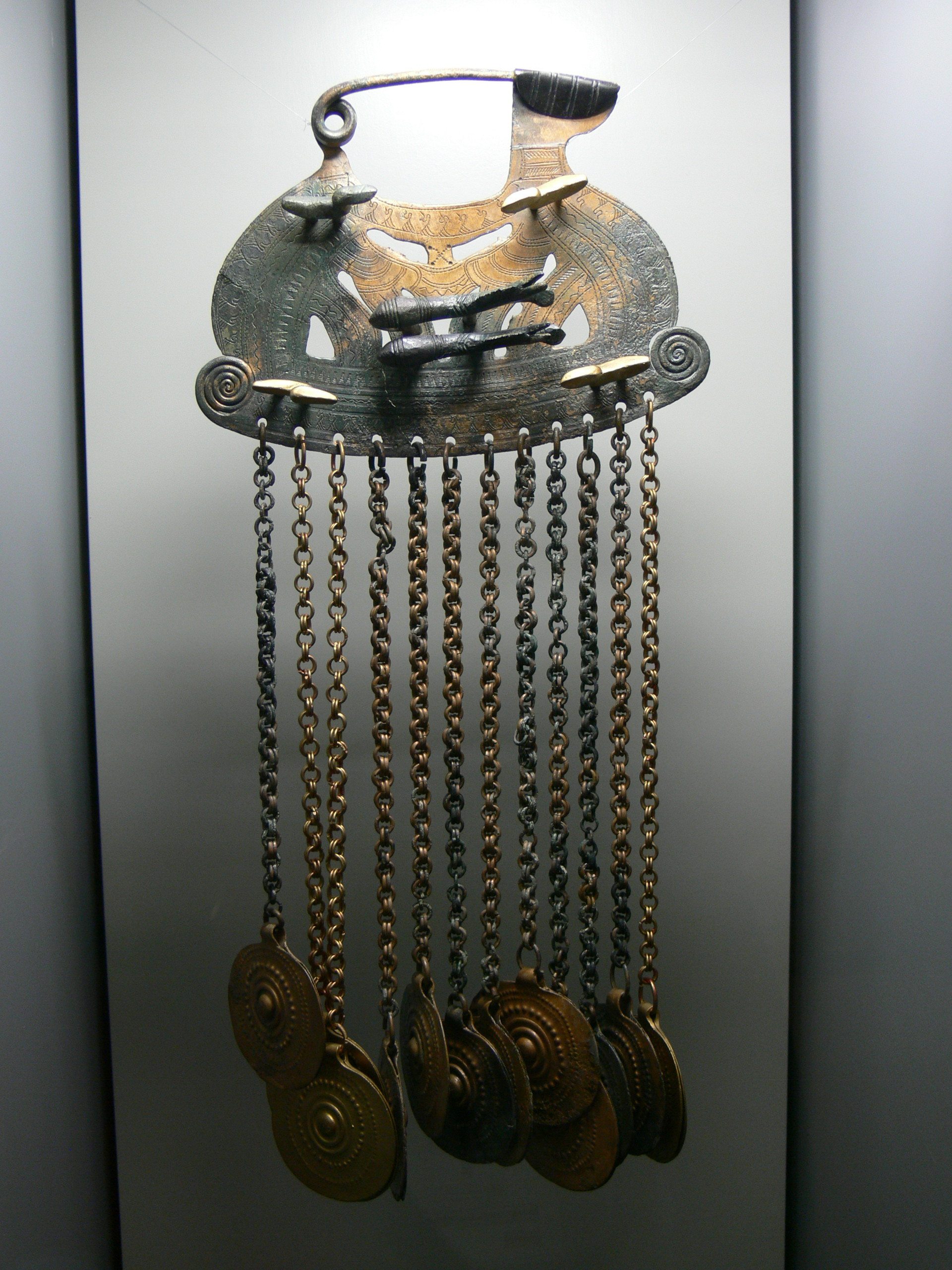
Fibula brooch with animal figures

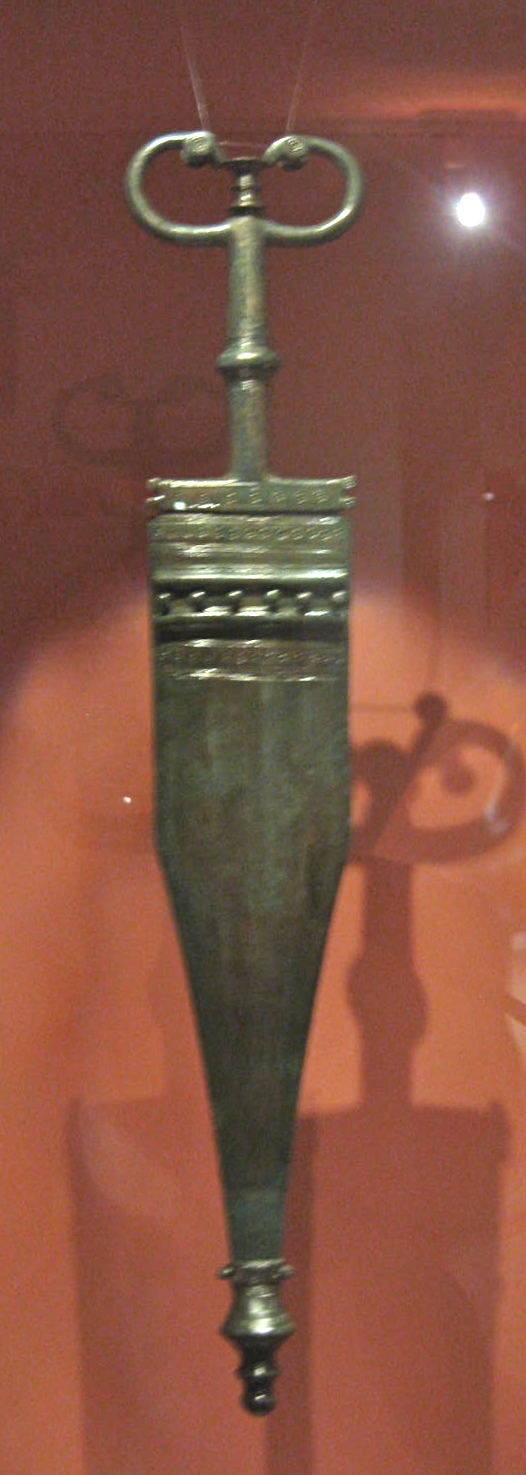
Dagger

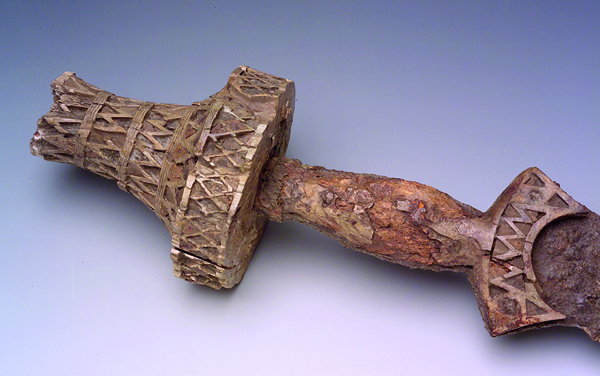
Sword hilt inlaid with ivory and amber.

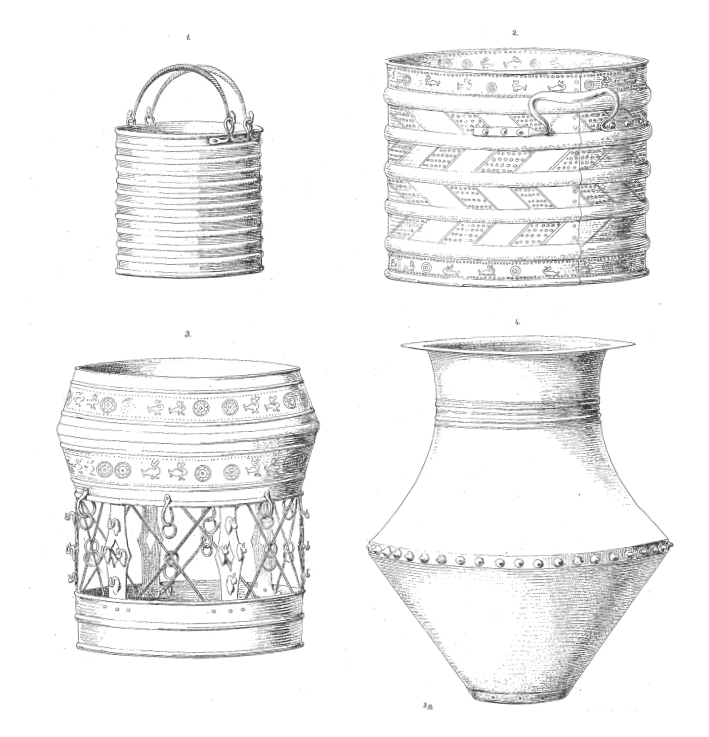
Finds from the Hallstatt cemetery

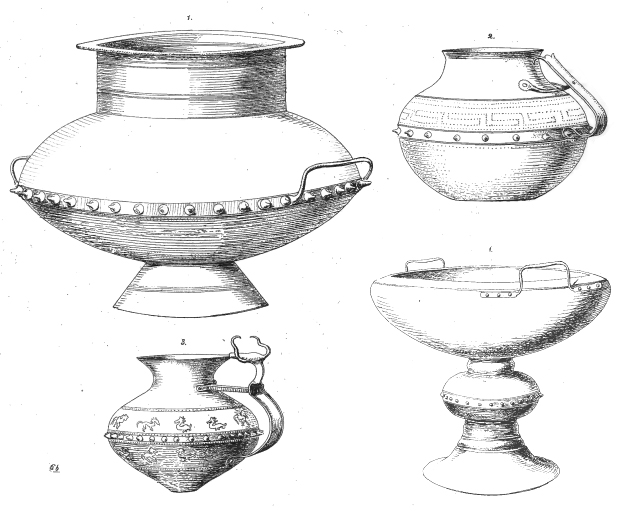
Finds from the Hallstatt cemetery

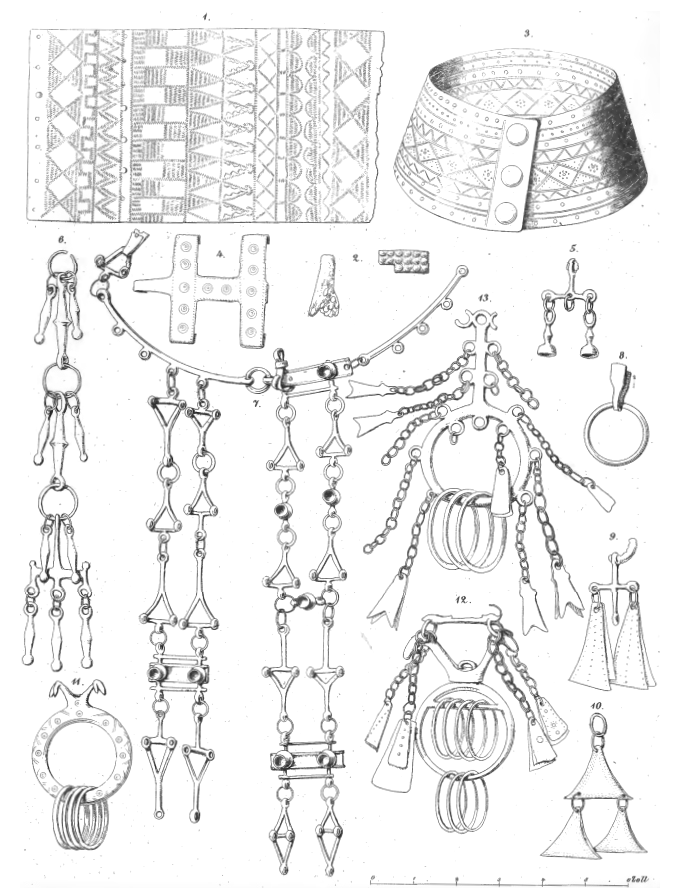
Ornaments from the Hallstatt cemetery

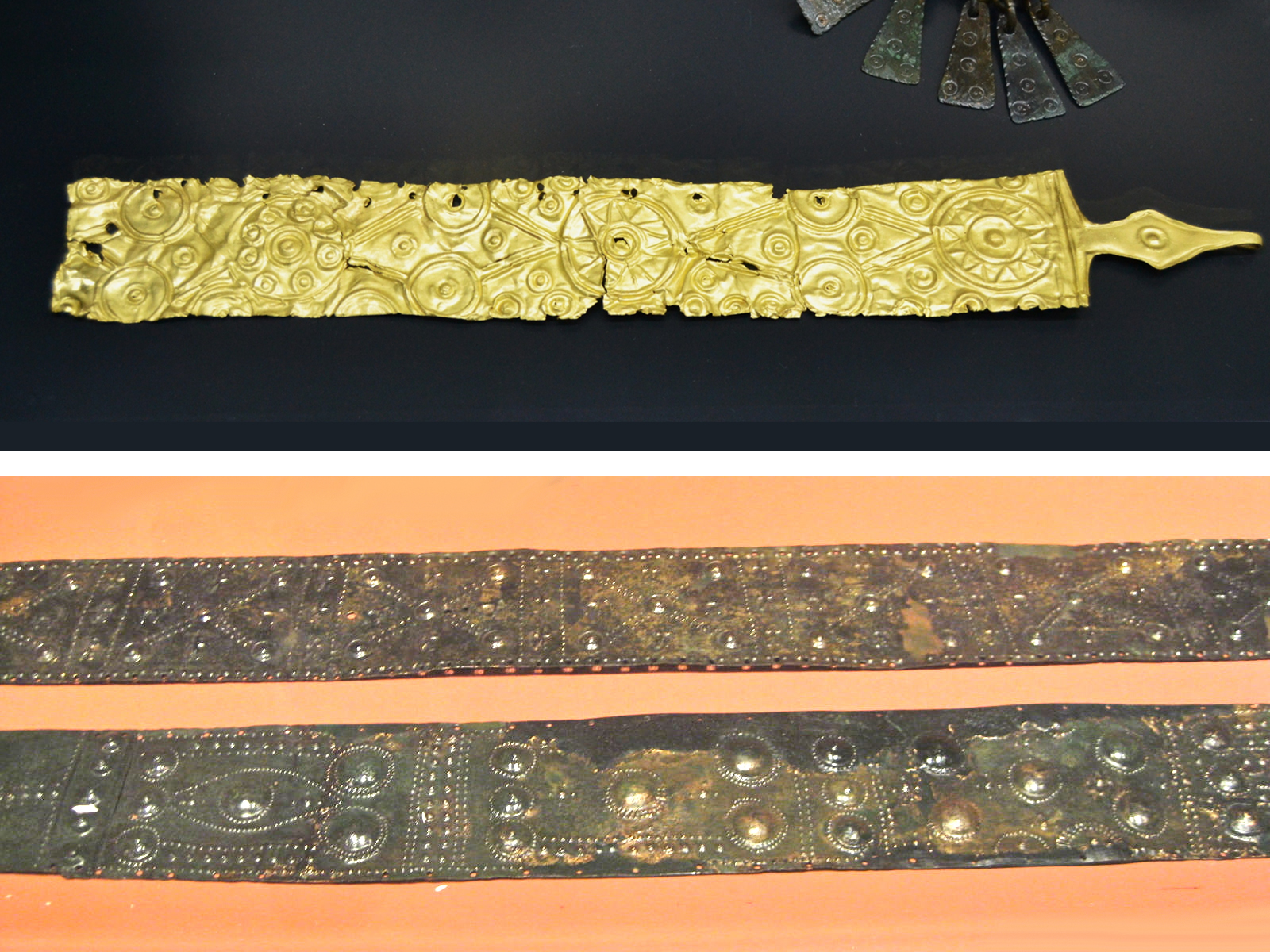
Gold and bronze beltplates from Hallstatt

== Culture and trade ==
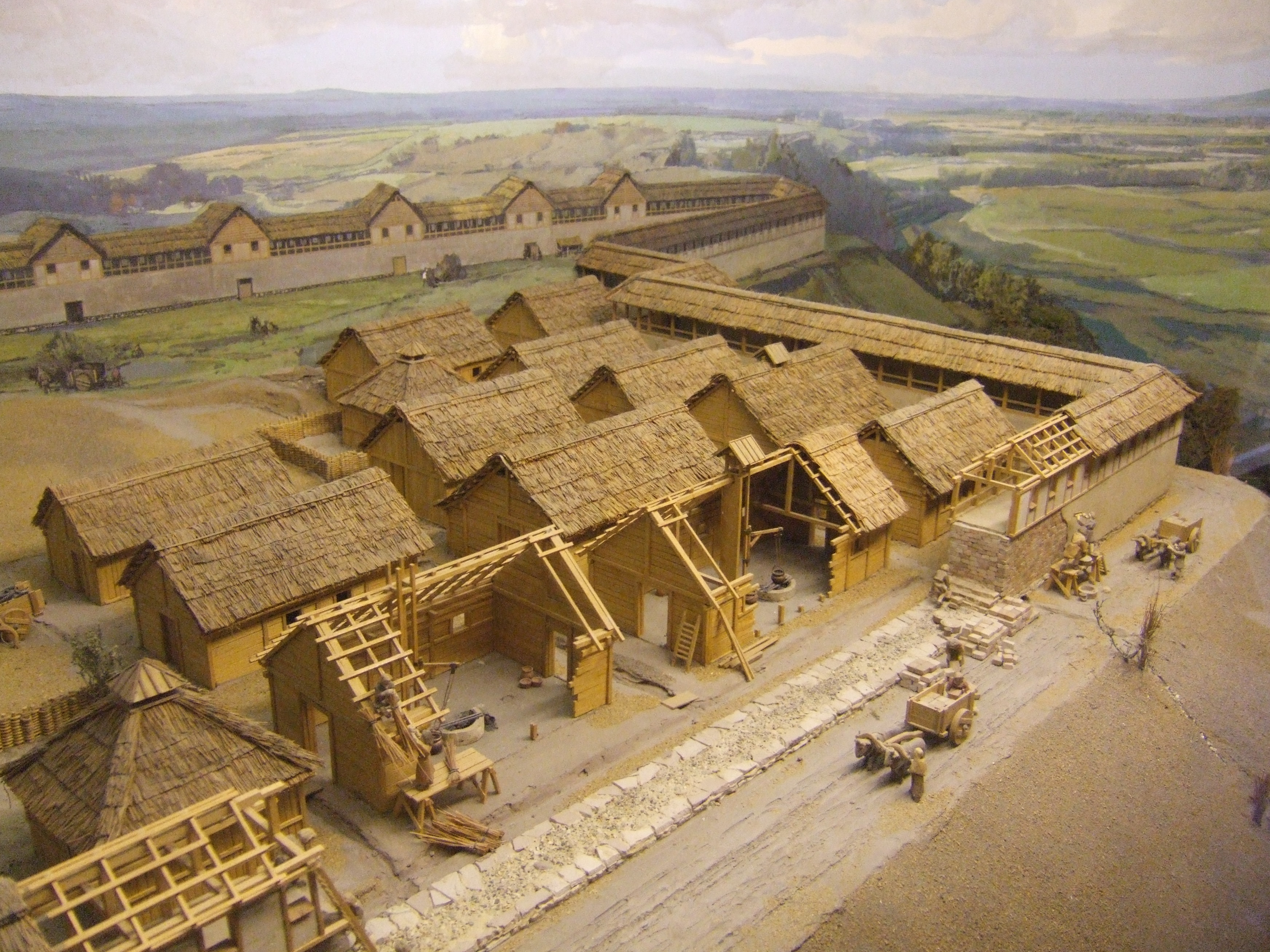
Model of the Heuneburg under construction, Germany, c. 600 BC

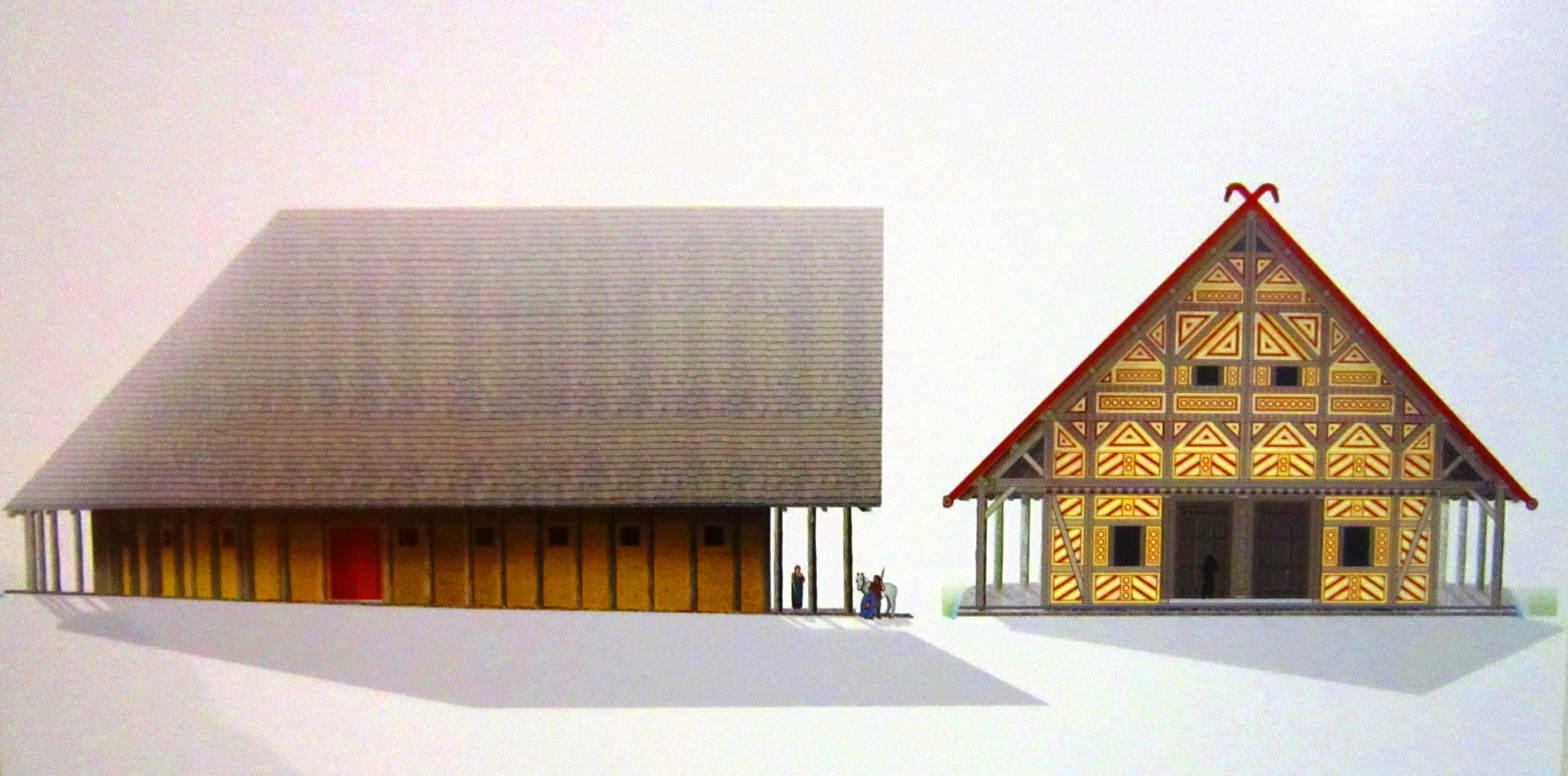
Part of the Vix palace, Mont Lassois, France, late 6th century BC

=== Languages ===
It is probable that some if not all of the diffusion of Hallstatt culture took place in a Celtic-speaking context. In northern Italy, the Golasecca culture developed through a process of cultural continuity from the earlier Canegrate culture, which emerged around the 13th century BC and displayed strong connections with the Central European Urnfield tradition. The Golasecca culture is regarded as early western examples of the broader Hallstatt movement, characterized by specialized pottery and metalworking. Lepontic inscriptions, dating from approximately the 6th century BC, demonstrate that the Golasecca region was inhabited by Celtic-speaking communities. This linguistic evidence, combined with the archaeological continuity between Canegrate and Golasecca, supports the hypothesis that Celtic languages may already have been spoken in the region during the Late Bronze Age.

Older assumptions of the early 20th century of Illyrians having been the bearers of especially the Eastern Hallstatt culture are indefensible and archaeologically unsubstantiated.

=== Trade ===
Trade with Greece is attested by finds of Attic black-figure pottery in the elite graves of the late Hallstatt period. It was probably imported via Massilia (Marseille). Other imported luxuries include amber, ivory (as found at the Grafenbühl Tomb) and probably wine. Red kermes dye was imported from the south as well; it was found at Hochdorf. Notable individual imports include the Greek Vix krater (the largest known metal vessel from Western classical antiquity), the Etruscan lebes from Sainte-Colombe-sur-Seine, the Greek hydria from Grächwil, the Greek cauldron from Hochdorf and the Greek or Etruscan cauldron from Lavau. Some weights and weighing equipment used in trade are known from this period, as in the preceding Urnfield period.

=== Settlements ===
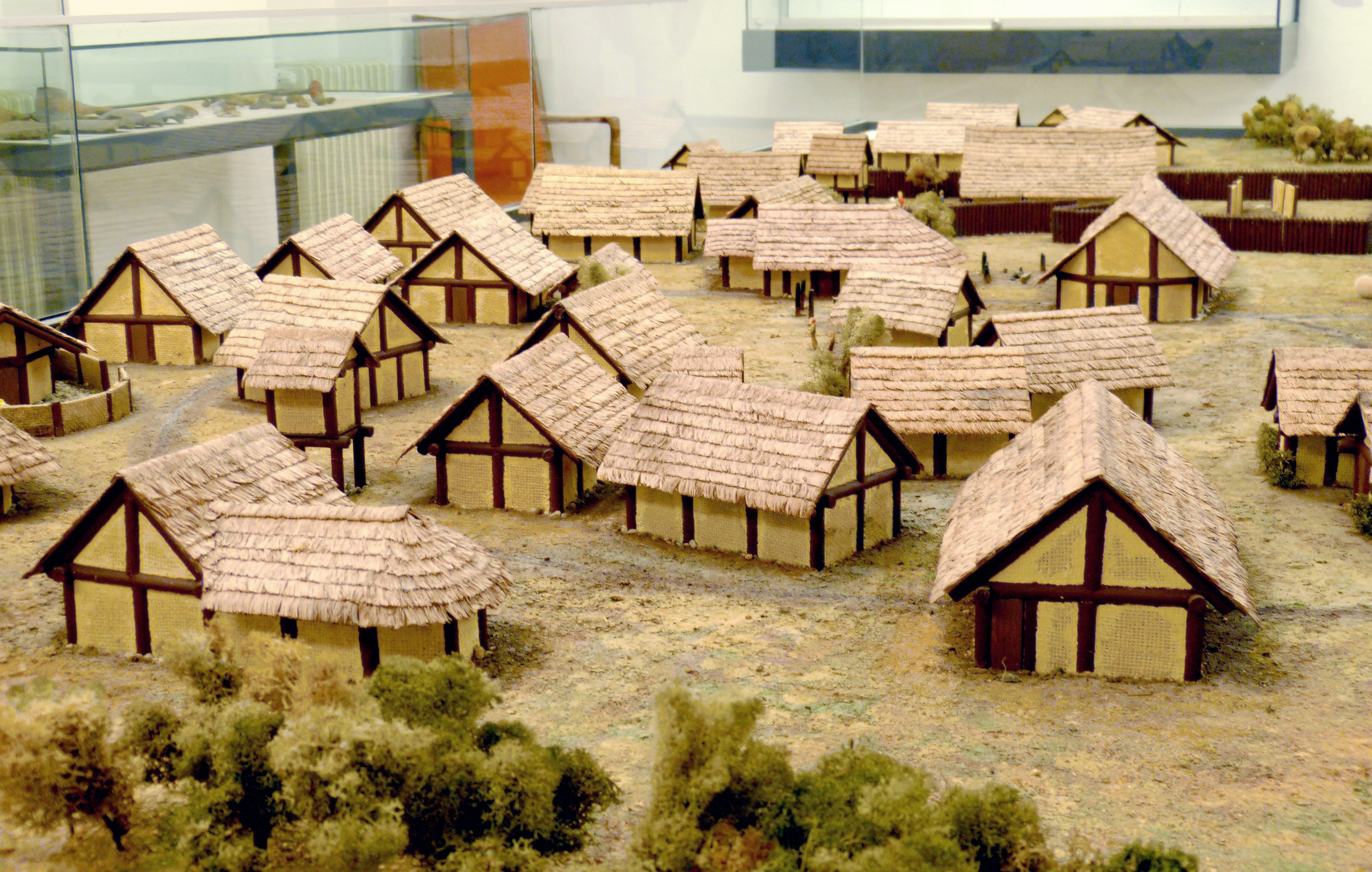
Model of a Hallstatt culture settlement at Konigsbrunn, Germany

The largest settlements were mostly fortified, situated on hilltops, and frequently included the workshops of bronze, silver and gold smiths. Major settlements are known as 'princely seats' (or Fürstensitze in German), and are characterized by elite residences, rich burials, monumental buildings and fortifications. Some of these central sites are described as urban or proto-urban, and as "the first cities north of the Alps". Typical sites of this type are the Heuneburg on the upper Danube surrounded by nine very large grave tumuli, and Mont Lassois in eastern France near Châtillon-sur-Seine with, at its foot, the very rich grave at Vix. The Heuneburg is thought to correspond to the Celtic city of Pyrene mentioned by Herodotus in 450 BC.

Other important sites include the Glauberg, Hohenasperg and Ipf in Germany, the Burgstallkogel in Austria and Molpír in Slovakia. However, most settlements were much smaller villages. The large monumental site of Alte Burg may have had a religious or ceremonial function, and possibly served as a location for games and competitions.

At the end of the Hallstatt period many major centres were abandoned and there was a return to a more decentralized settlement pattern. Urban centres later re-emerged across temperate Europe in the 3rd and 2nd centuries BC during the La Tène period.

=== Burial rites ===
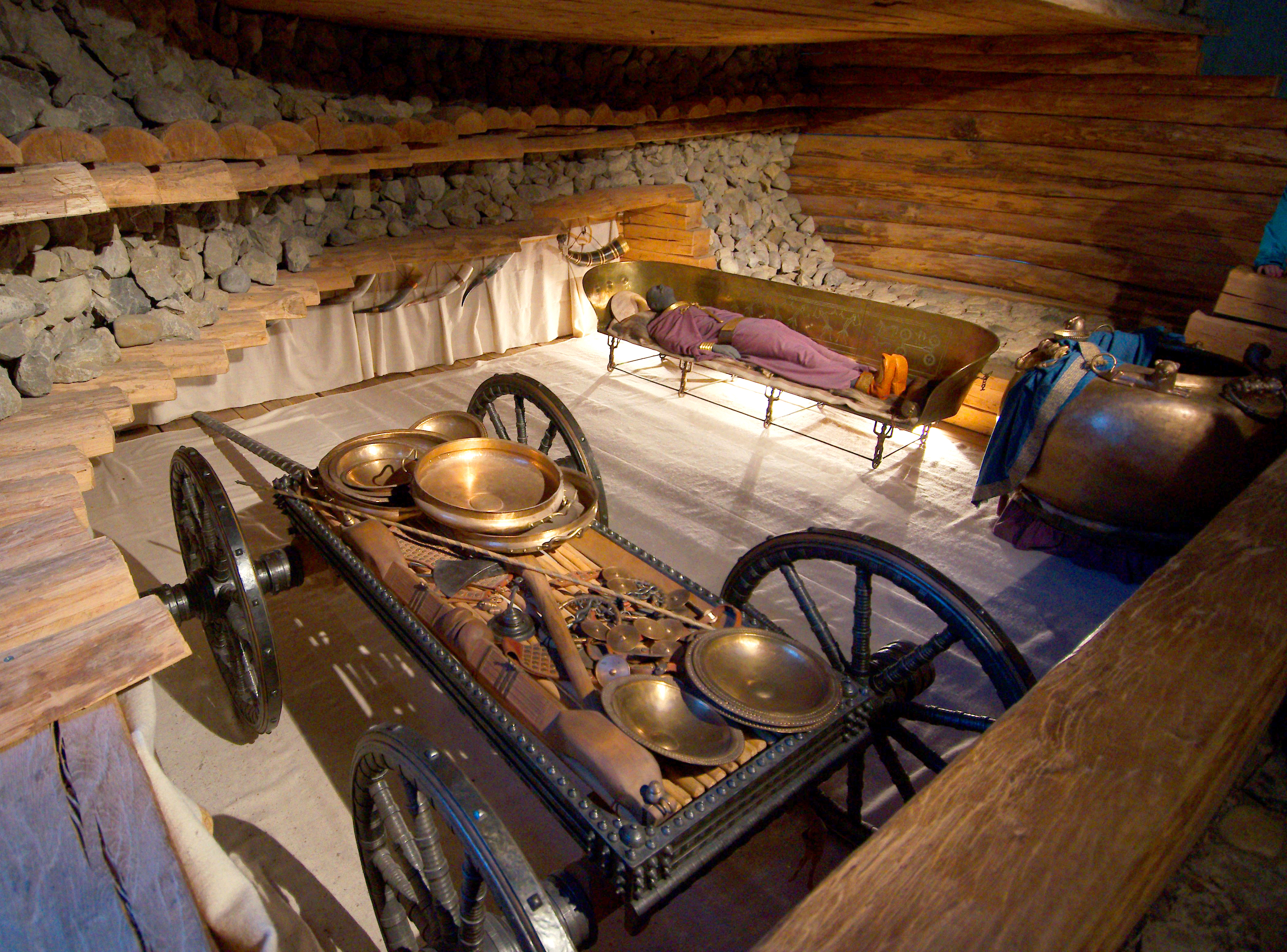
The Hochdorf Chieftain's Grave, near to the Hohenasperg princely seat, Germany, 530 BC

The burials at Hallstatt itself show a movement over the period from cremation to inhumation, with grave goods at all times (see above).

In the central Hallstatt regions toward the end of the period (Ha D), very rich graves of high-status individuals under large tumuli are found near the remains of fortified hilltop settlements. Tumuli graves had a chamber, rather large in some cases, lined with timber and with the body and grave goods set about the room. There are some chariot or wagon burials, including Býčí Skála and Brno-Holásky in the Czech Republic, Vix, Sainte-Colombe-sur-Seine and Lavau in France, Hochdorf, Hohmichele and Grafenbühl in Germany, and Mitterkirchen in Austria.

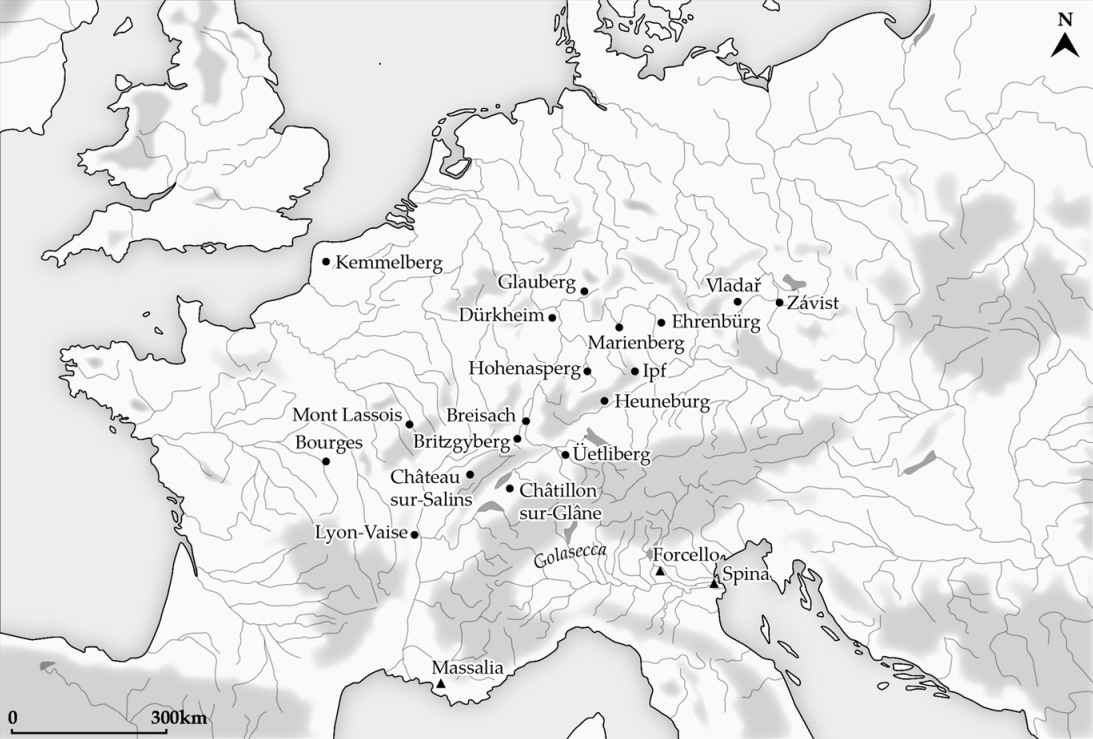
Distribution of main central places north of the Alps, 6th–5th centuries BC

A model of a chariot made from lead has been found in Frög, Carinthia, and clay models of horses with riders are also found. Wooden "funerary carts", presumably used as hearses and then buried, are sometimes found in the grandest graves. Pottery and bronze vessels, weapons, elaborate jewellery made of bronze and gold, as well as a few stone stelae (especially the famous Warrior of Hirschlanden) are found at such burials. The daggers that largely replaced swords in chief's graves in the west were probably not serious weapons, but badges of rank, and used at the table.

=== Social structure ===
The material culture of Western Hallstatt culture was apparently sufficient to provide a stable social and economic equilibrium. The founding of Marseille and the penetration by Greek and Etruscan culture after c. 600 BC, resulted in long-range trade relationships up the Rhone valley which triggered social and cultural transformations in the Hallstatt settlements north of the Alps. Powerful local chiefdoms emerged which controlled the redistribution of luxury goods from the Mediterranean world that is also characteristic of the La Tène culture.

Ancient DNA has provided evidence for the existence of matrilineal 'dynastic elites' during the Hallstatt period. The evidence for selective mating across geographic distances of more than 100 km and time spans of up to 140 years suggests "a high degree of social complexity and the emergence of regional-scale hierarchy", with marital alliances connecting distant elite centres. The archaeologist Dirk Krausse has suggested that some of the rulers of the Hallstatt period may have combined the roles of king and priest as 'sacral kings'.

The apparently largely peaceful and prosperous life of Hallstatt D culture was disrupted, perhaps even collapsed, right at the end of the period. There has been much speculation as to the causes of this, which remain uncertain. Large settlements such as Heuneburg and the Burgstallkogel were destroyed or abandoned, rich tumulus burials ended, and old ones were looted. There was probably a significant movement of population westwards, and the succeeding La Tène culture developed new centres to the west and north, their growth perhaps overlapping with the final years of the Hallstatt culture.

=== Technology ===
Occasional iron artefacts had been appearing in central and western Europe for some centuries before 800 BC (an iron knife or sickle from Ganovce in Slovakia, dating to the 18th century BC, is possibly the earliest evidence of smelted iron in Central Europe). By the later Urnfield (Hallstatt B) phase, some swords were already being made and embellished in iron in eastern Central Europe, and occasionally much further west.

Initially iron was rather exotic and expensive, and sometimes used as a prestige material for jewellery. Iron swords became more common after c. 800 BC, and steel was also produced from 800 BC as part of the production of swords. The production of high-carbon steel is attested in Britain after c. 490 BC.

The remarkable uniformity of spoked-wheel wagons from across the Hallstatt region indicates a certain standardisation of production methods, which included techniques such as lathe-turning. Iron tyres were developed and refined in this period, leading to the invention of shrunk-on tyres in the La Tène period. The potter's wheel also appeared in the Hallstatt period.

The extensive use of planking and massive squared beams indicates the use of long saw blades and possibly two-man sawing. The planks of the Hohmichele burial chamber (6th c. BC), which were over 6m long and 35 cm wide, appear to have been sawn by a large timber-yard saw. The construction of monumental buildings such as the Vix palace further demonstrates a "mastery of geometry and carpentry capable of freeing up vast interior spaces."

Analysis of building remains in Silesia has found evidence for the use of a standard unit of length (equivalent to 0.785 m). Remarkably, this is almost identical to the length of a measuring stick found at Borum Eshøj in Denmark (0.7855 m) dating from the Bronze Age (c. 1350 BC). Pythagorean triangles were likely used in building construction to create right angles, and some buildings had ground plans with dimensions corresponding to Pythagorean rectangles.

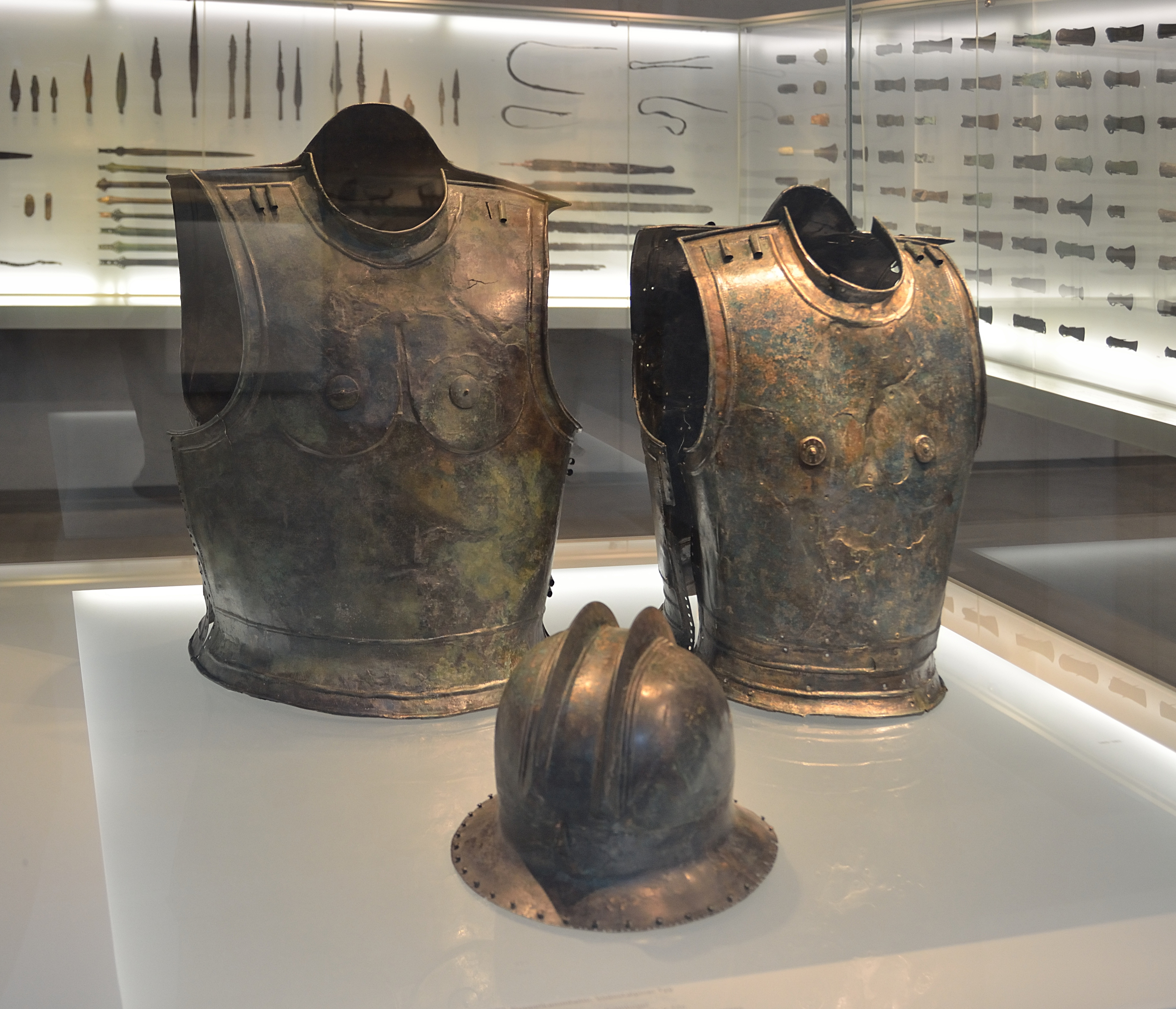
Cuirasses and helmet from Kleinklein, Austria, 6th-7th centuries BC.

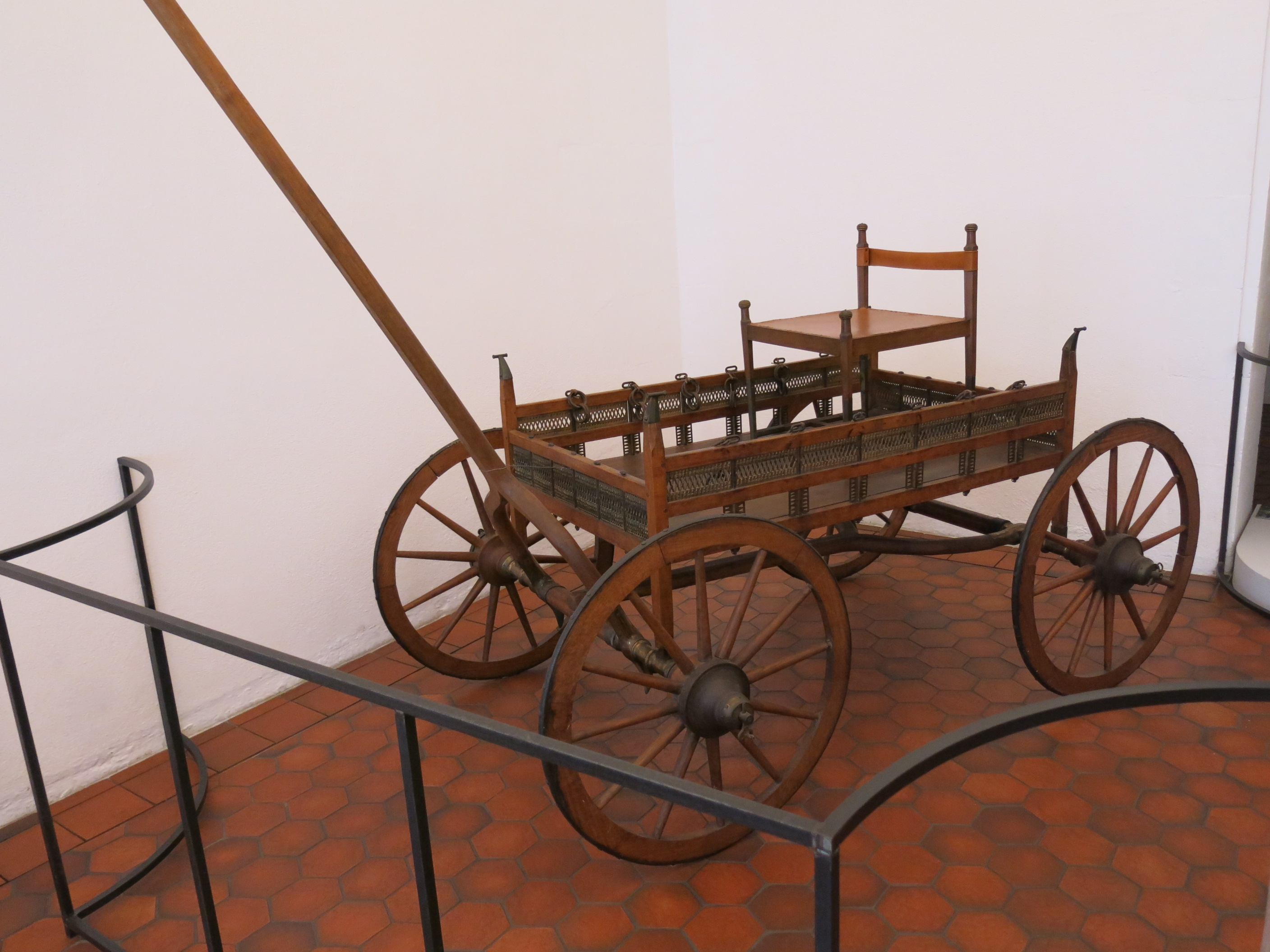
Funerary wagon, reconstruction, Strasbourg Museum, France

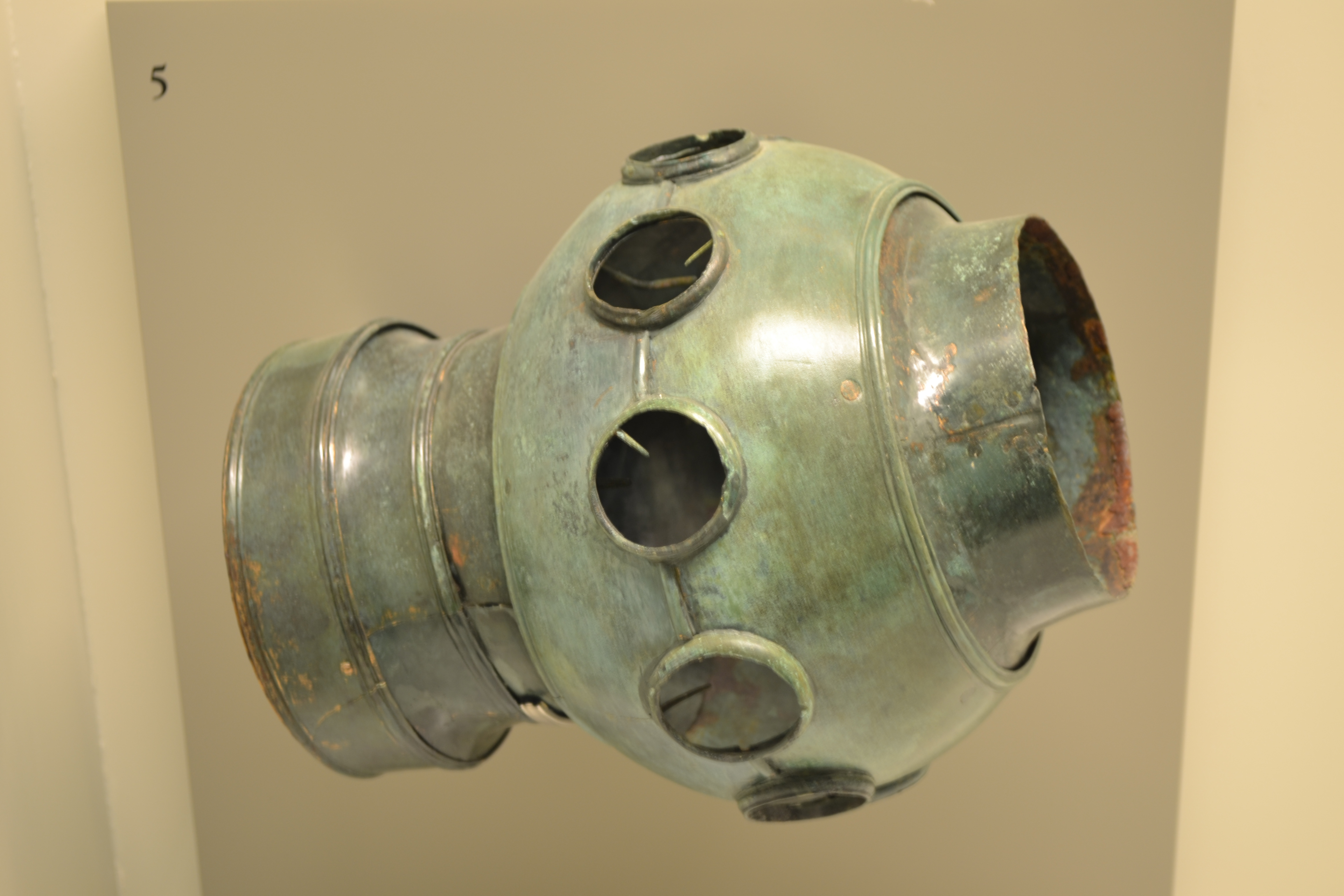
Wagon wheel hub from the Vix Grave, France

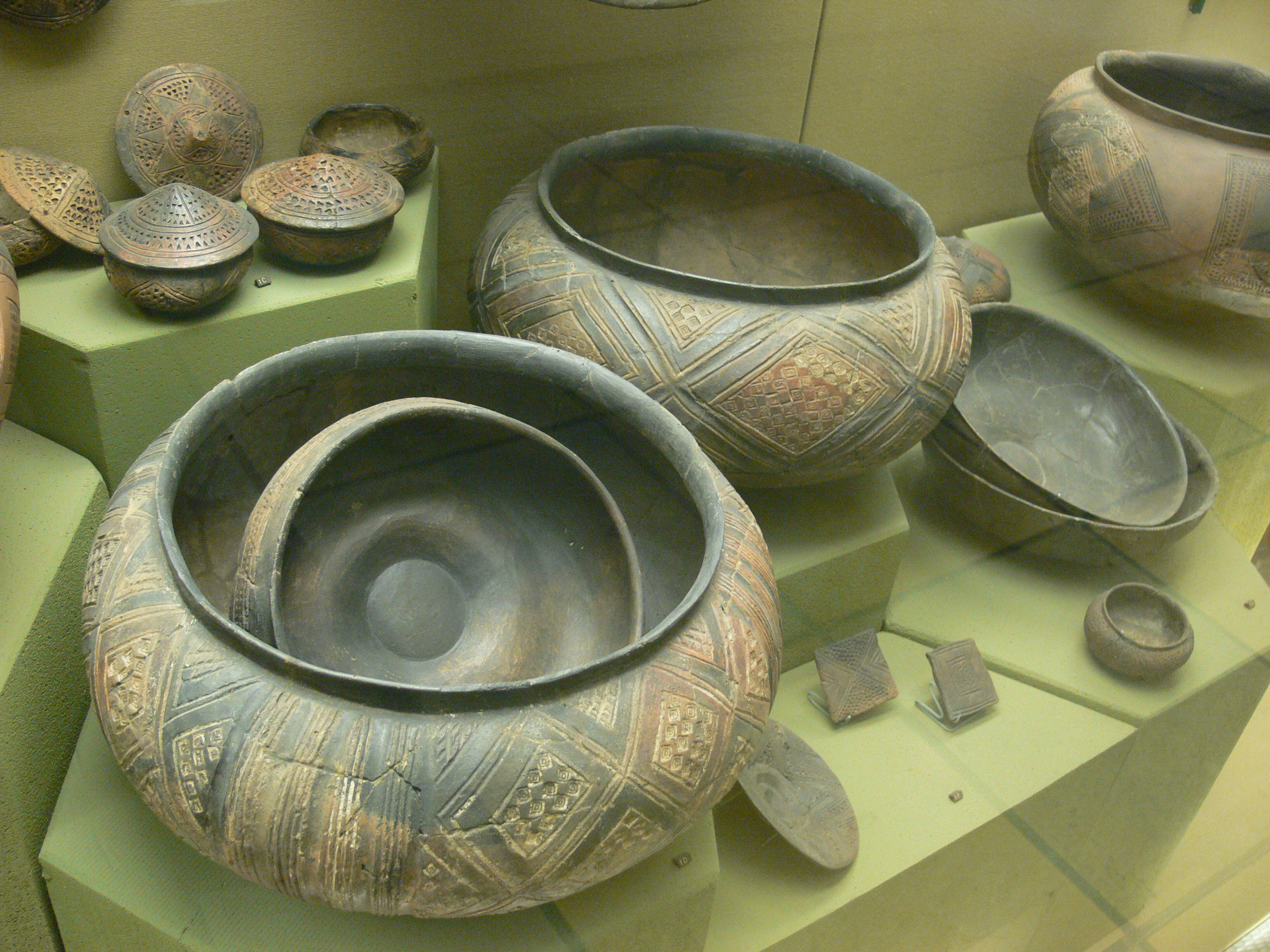
Pottery from Heuneburg, Germany

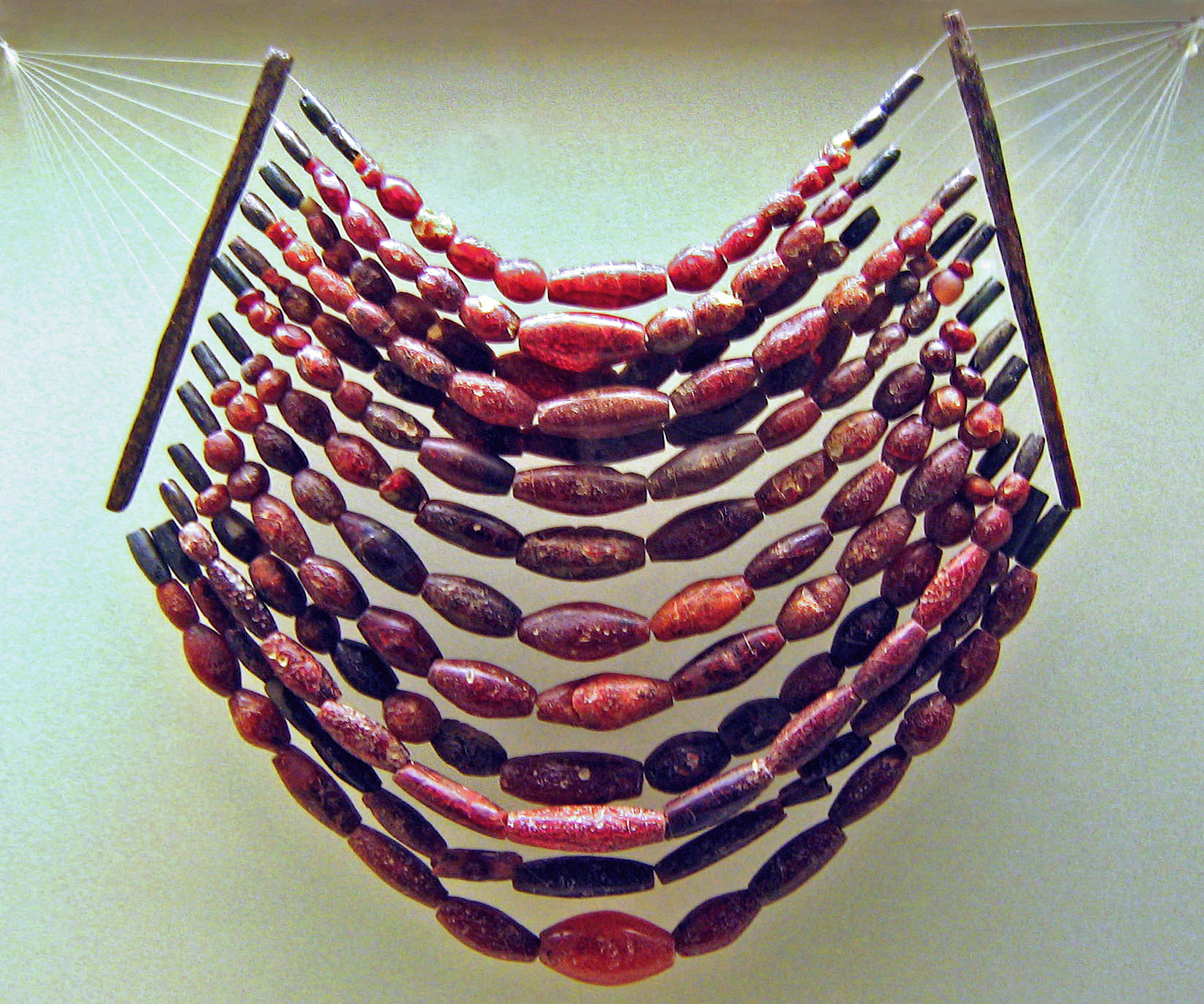
Amber necklace from the Magdalenenberg, Germany

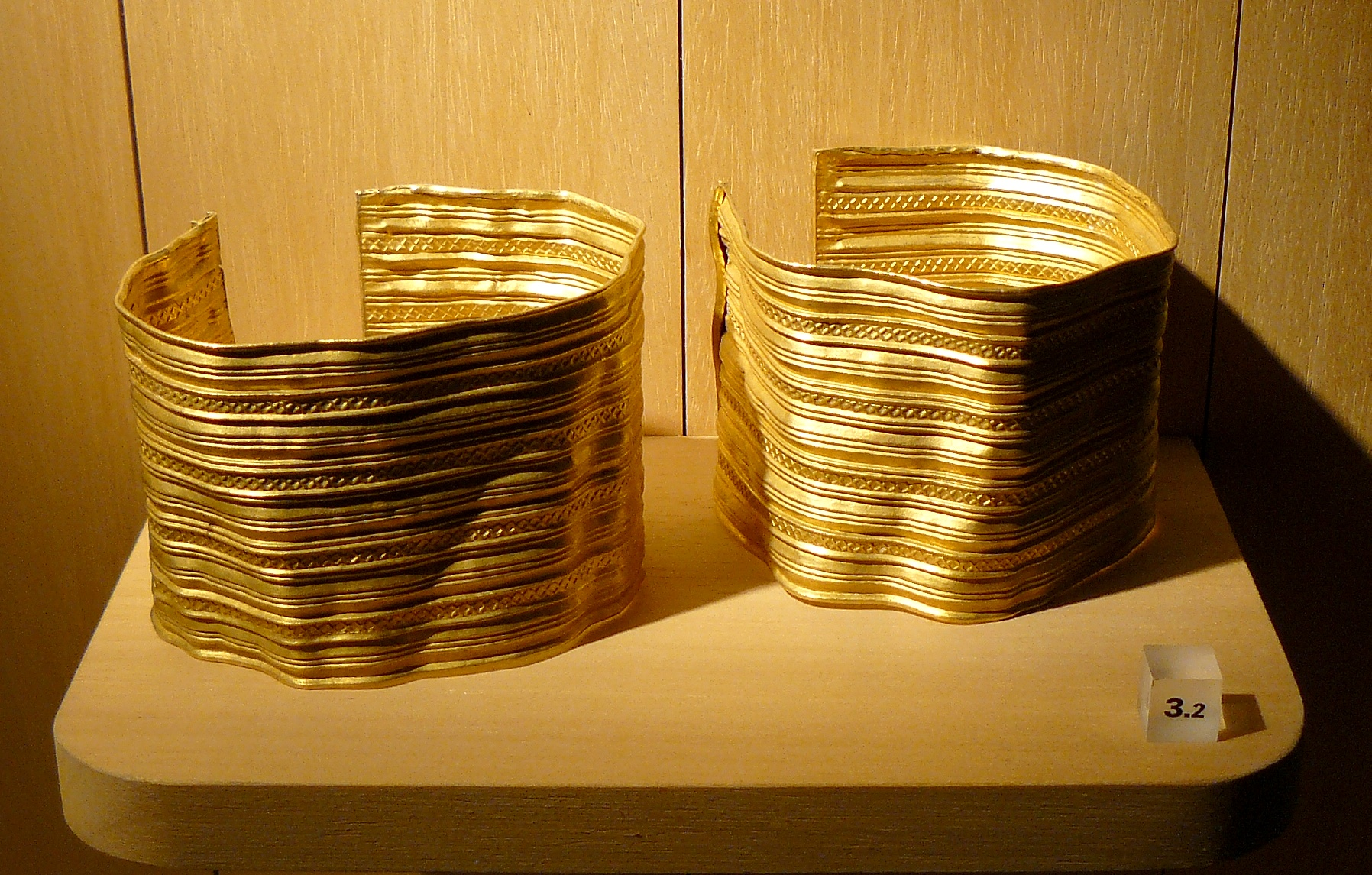
Gold bracelets from Sainte-Colombe-sur-Seine, France

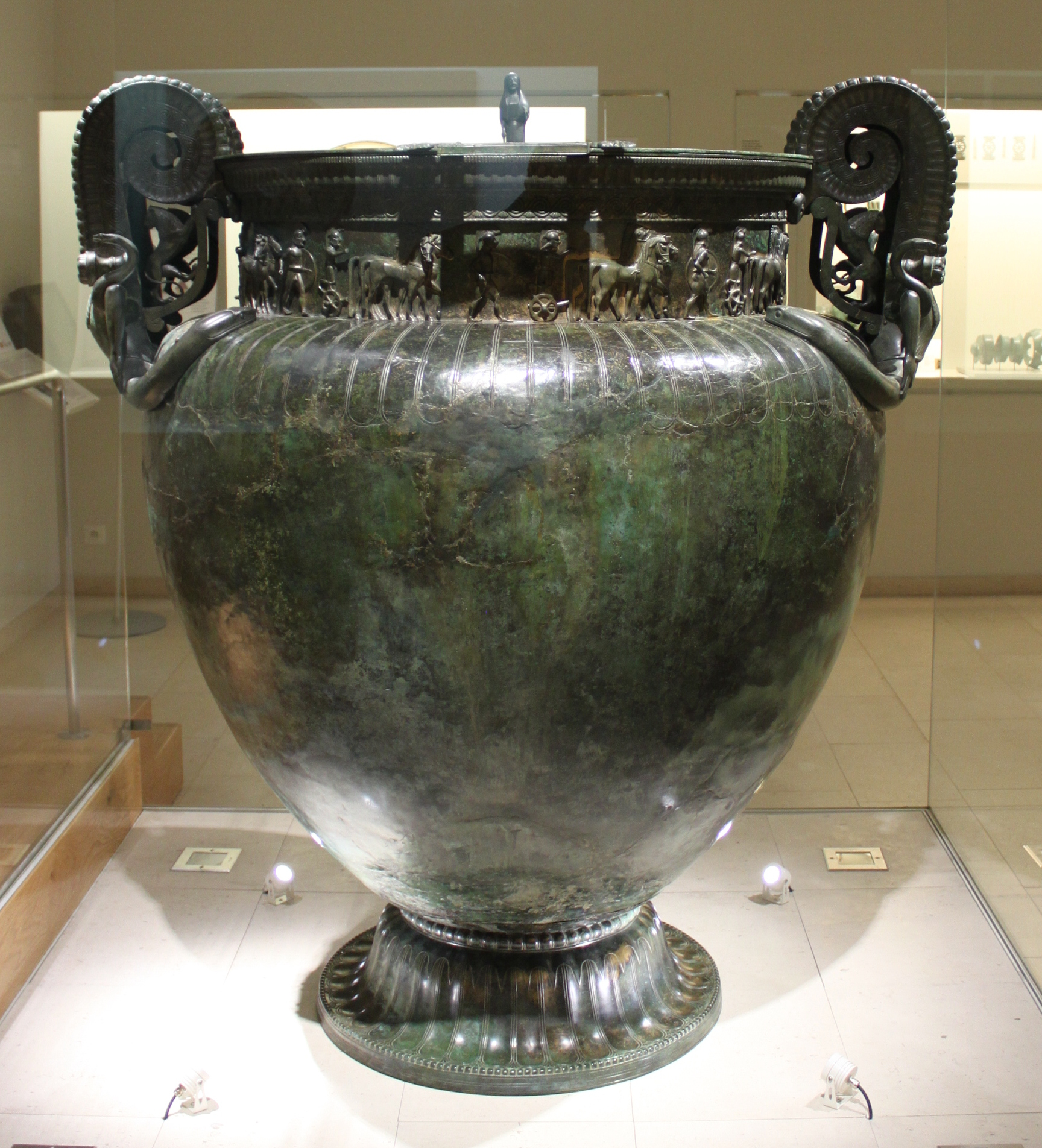
The Vix krater, imported from Greece

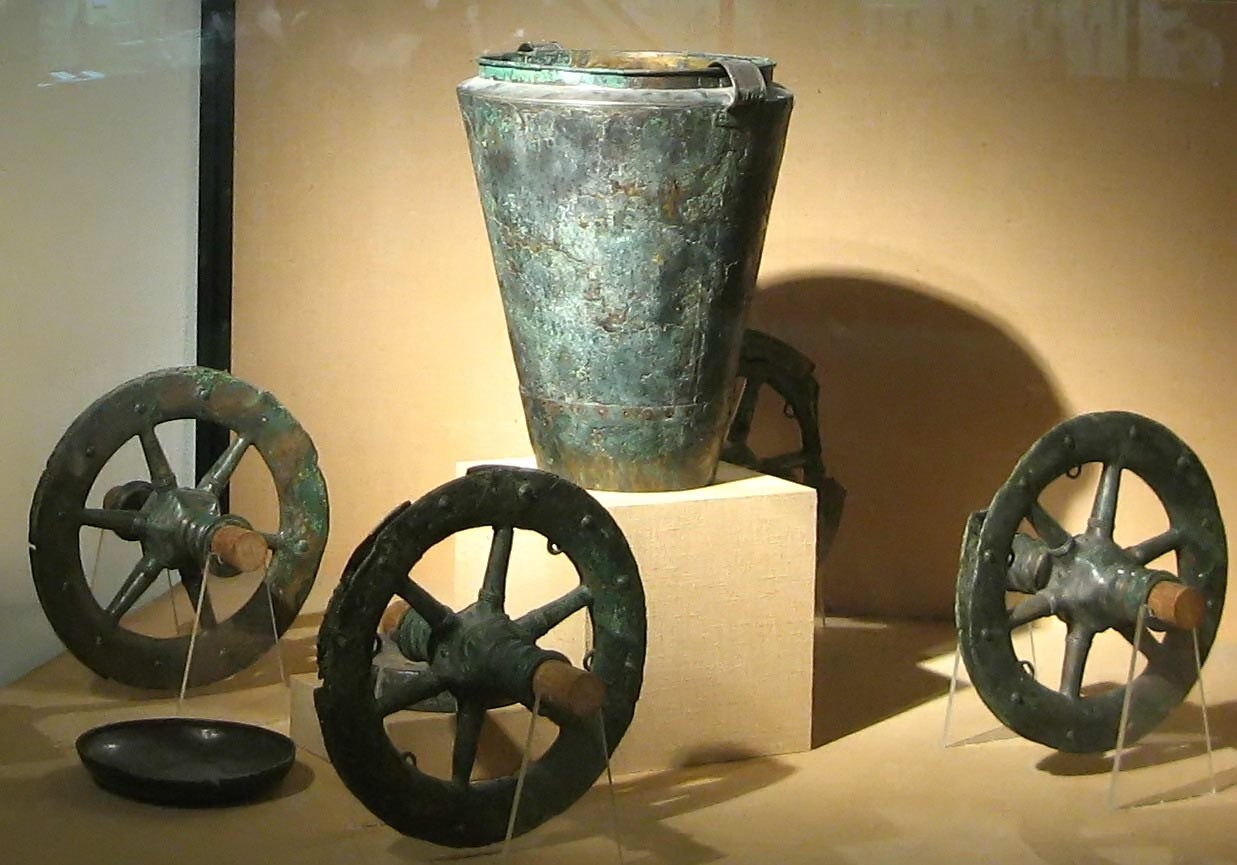
Cult wagon from La Côte-Saint-André, France.

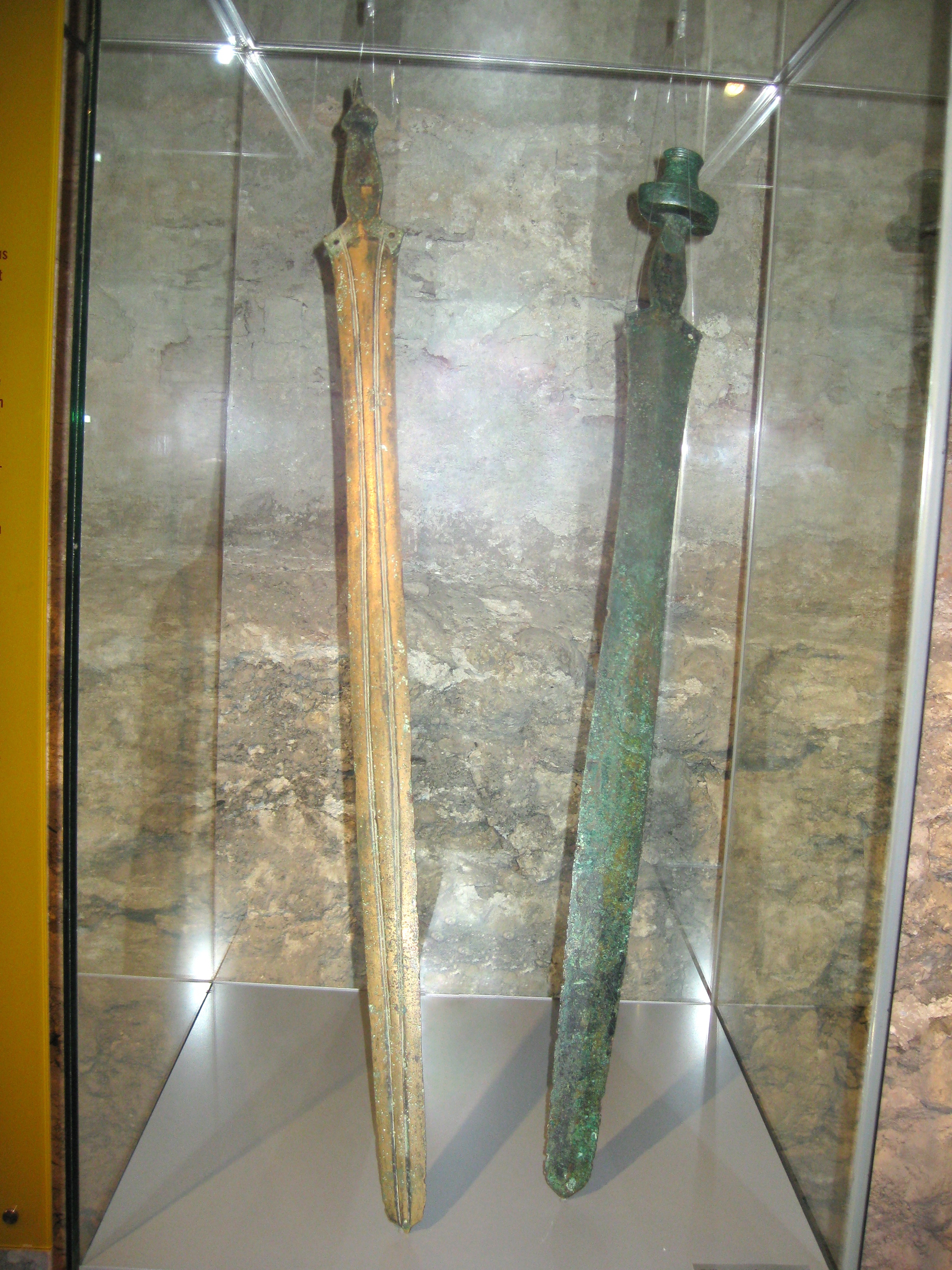
Hallstatt 'C' swords in Wels Museum, Austria.

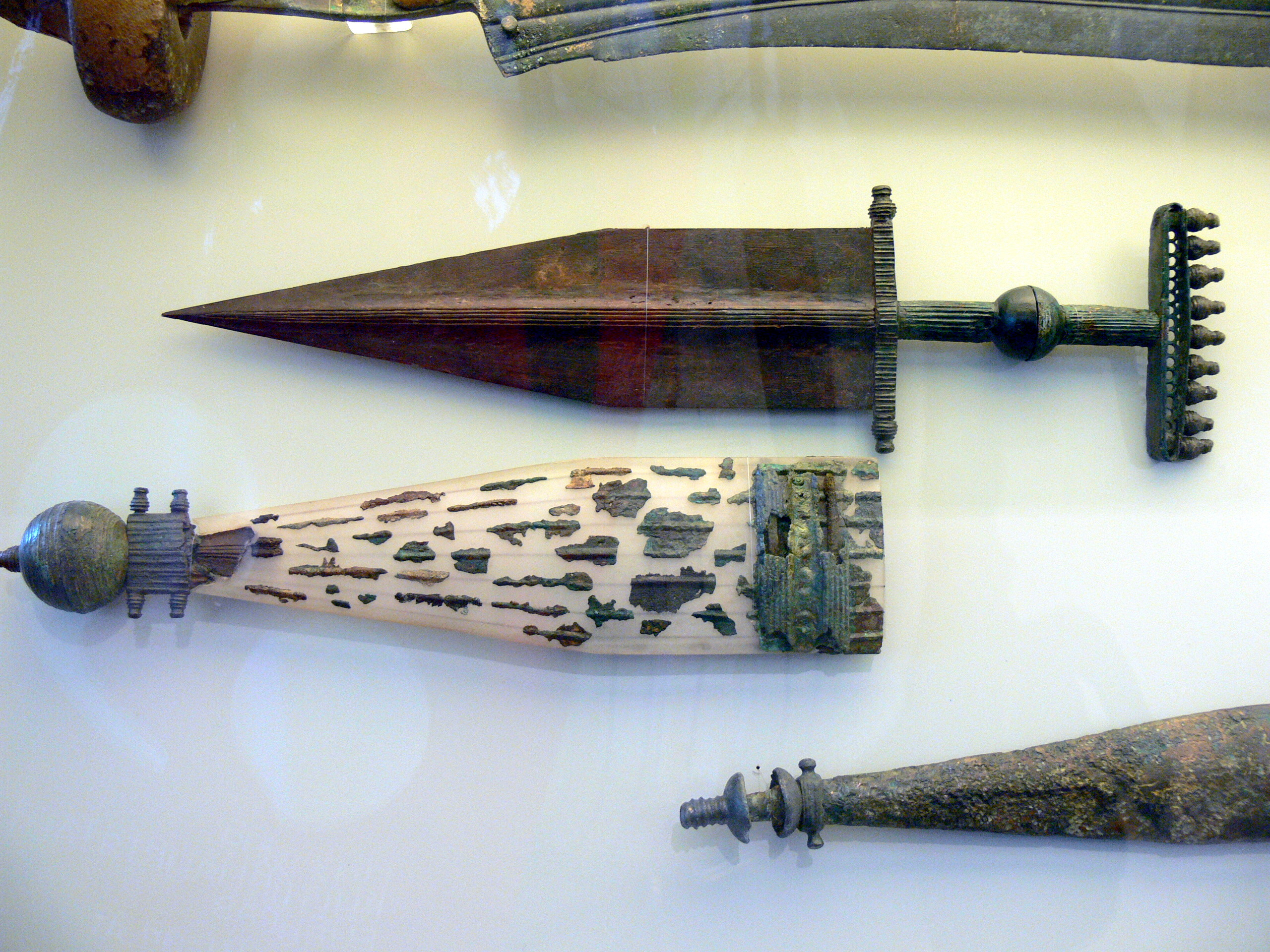
Dagger with "antenna hilt"

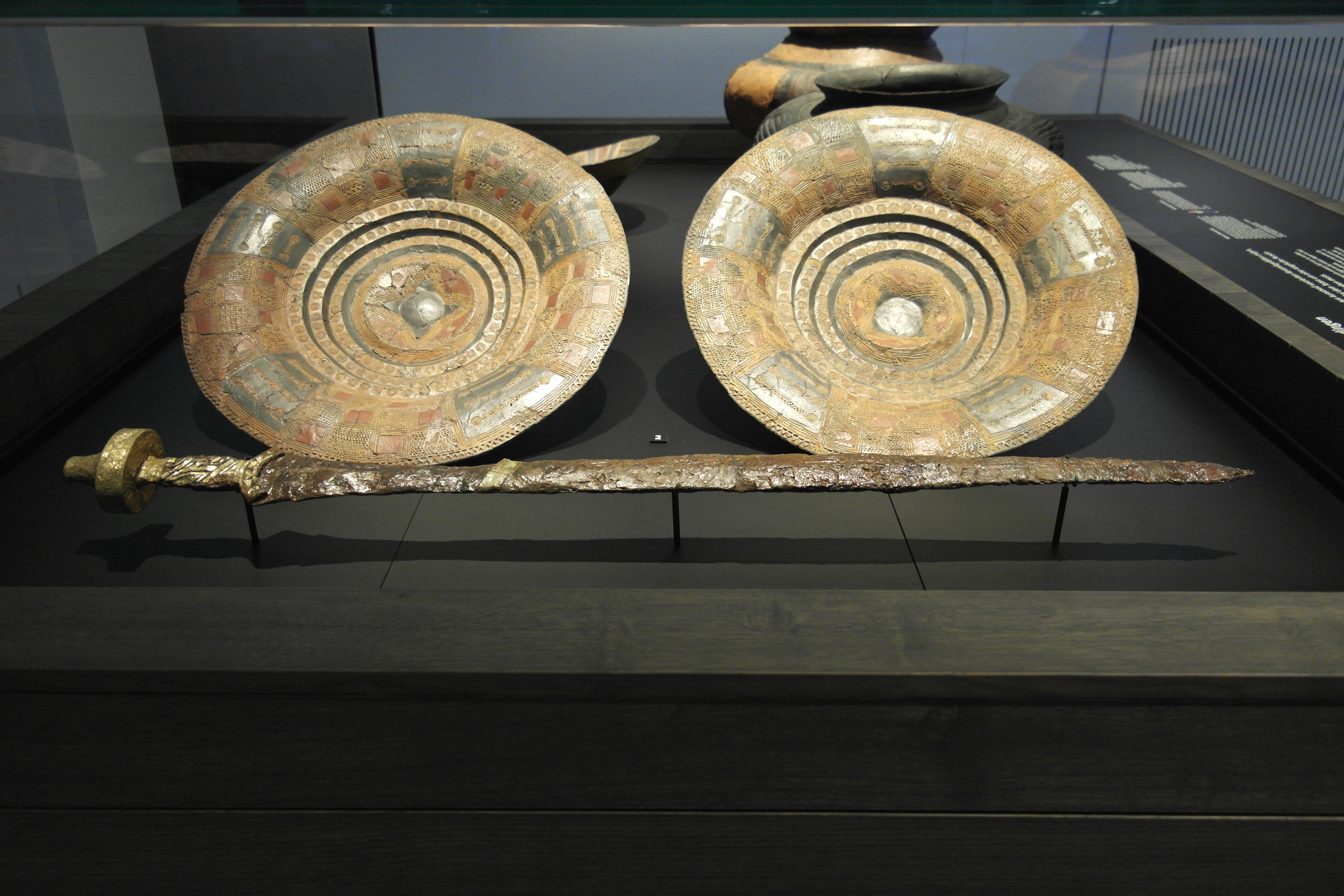
Ceramics and sword with gold hilt from Gomadingen

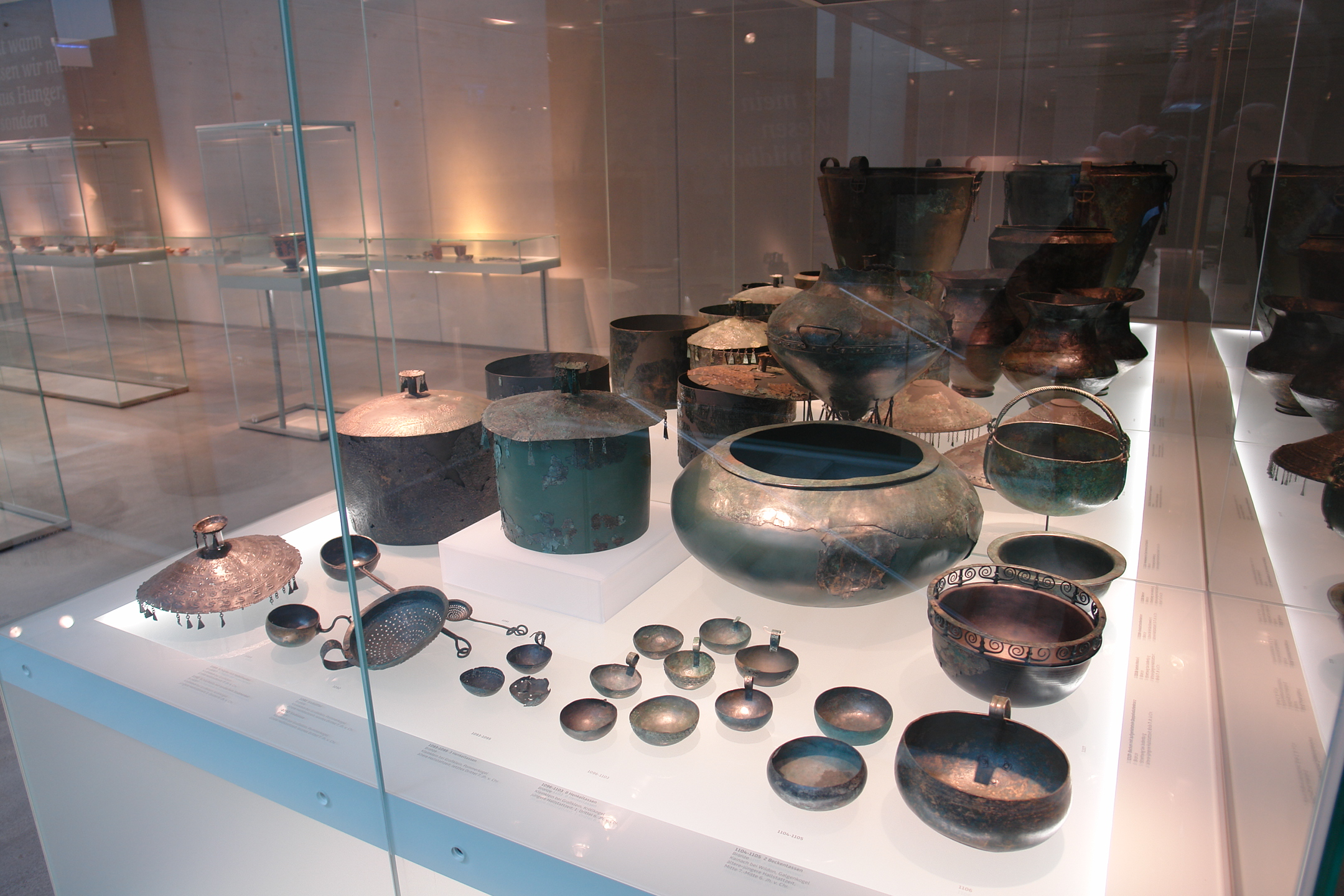
Metal vessels from Kleinklein

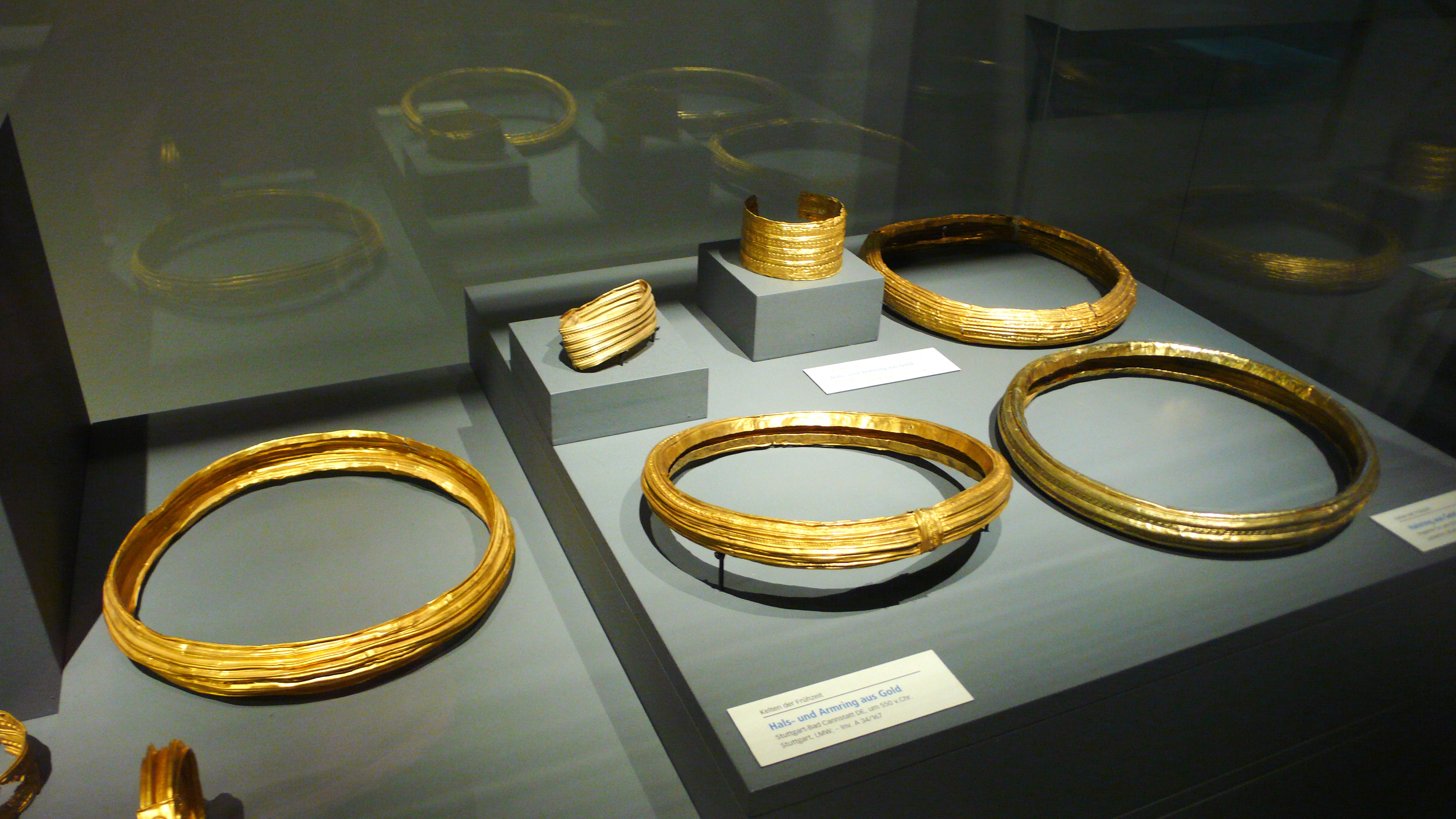
Gold artefacts from the Heuneburg

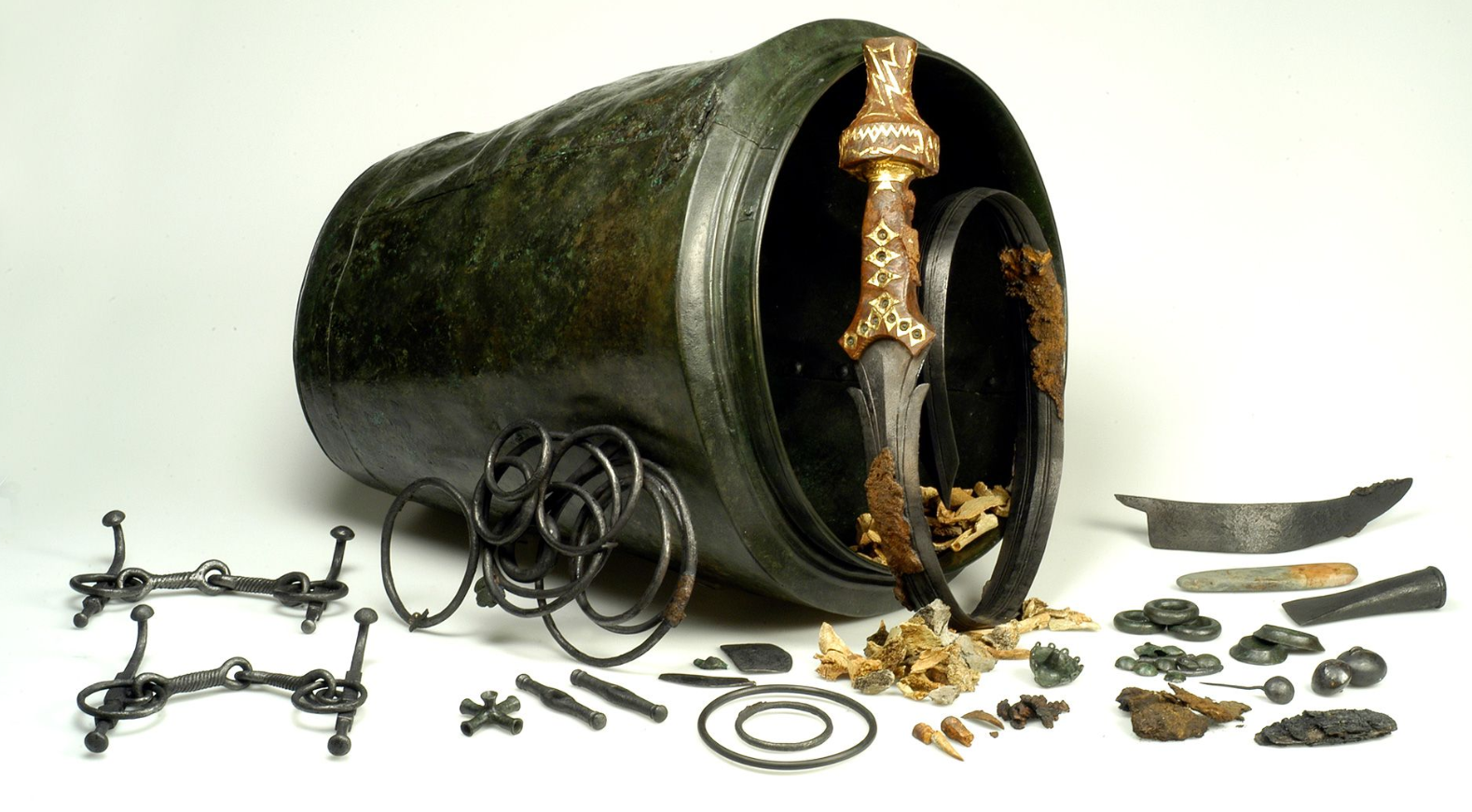
Burial goods from Oss, Netherlands

== Art ==
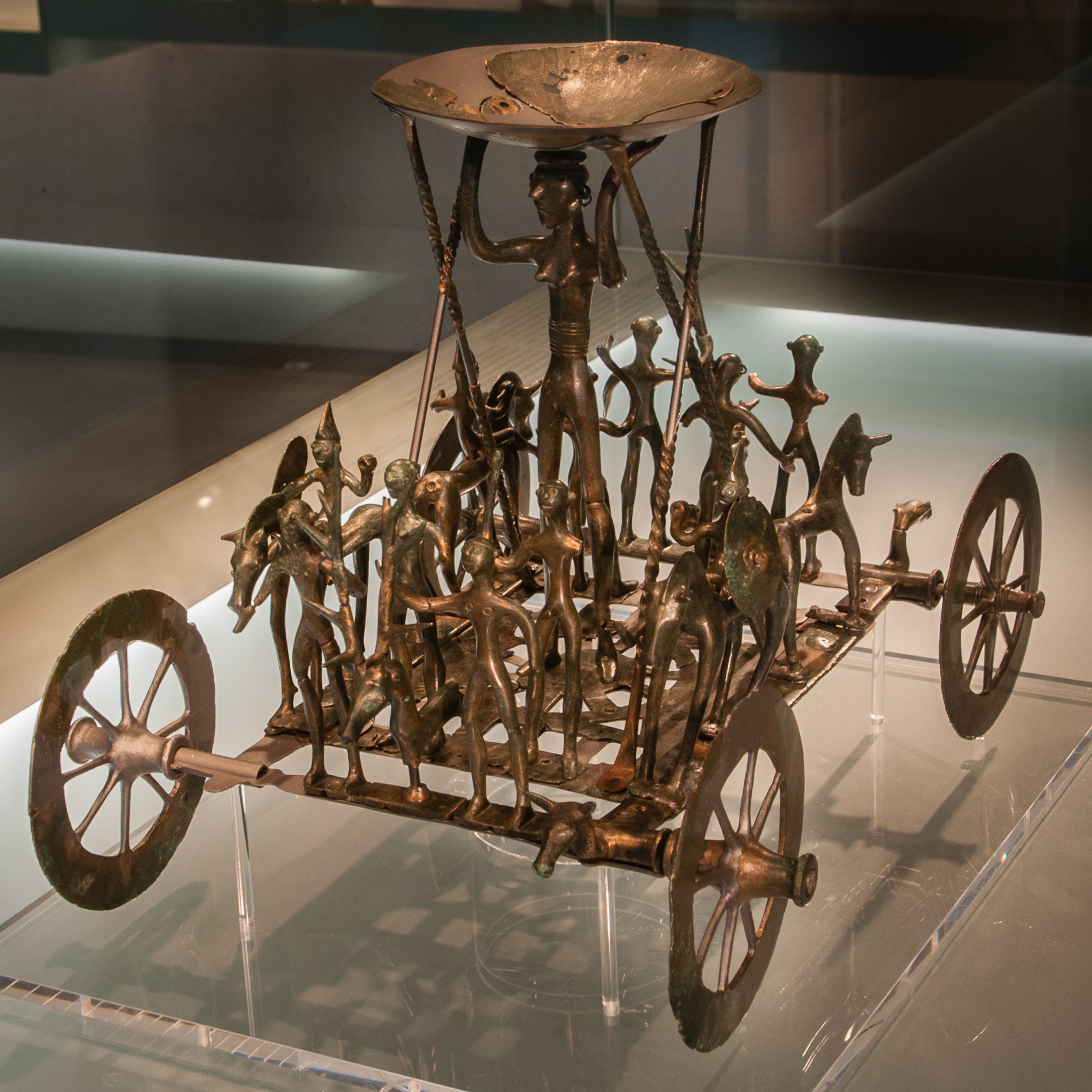
The Strettweg Cult Wagon, Austria, c. 600 BC

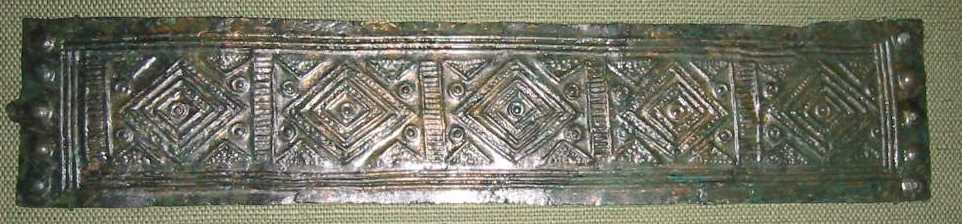
Typical decoration on a belt-plate

At least the later periods of Hallstatt art from the western zone are generally agreed to form the early period of Celtic art. Decoration is mostly geometric and linear, and best seen on fine metalwork finds from graves (see above). Styles differ, especially between the west and east, with more human figures and some narrative elements in the latter. Animals, with waterfowl a particular favourite, are often included as part of other objects, more often than humans, and in the west there is almost no narrative content such as scenes of combat depicted. These characteristics were continued into the succeeding La Tène style.

Imported luxury art is sometimes found in rich elite graves in the later phases, and certainly had some influence on local styles. The most spectacular objects, such as the Strettweg Cult Wagon, the Warrior of Hirschlanden and the bronze couch supported by "unicyclists" from the Hochdorf Chieftain's Grave are one of a kind in finds from the Hallstatt period, though they can be related to objects from other periods.

More common objects include weapons, in Ha D often with hilts terminating in curving forks ("antenna hilts"). Jewellery in metal includes fibulae, often with a row of disks hanging down on chains, armlets and some torcs. This is mostly in bronze, but "princely" burials include items in gold.

The origin of the narrative scenes of the eastern zone, from Hallstatt C onwards, is generally traced to influence from the Situla art of northern Italy and the northern Adriatic, where these bronze buckets began to be decorated in bands with figures in provincial Etruscan centres influenced by Etruscan and Greek art. The fashion for decorated situlae spread north across neighbouring cultures including the eastern Hallstatt zone, beginning around 600 BC and surviving until about 400 BC; the Vače situla is a Slovenian example from near the final period. The style is also found on bronze belt plates, and some of the vocabulary of motifs spread to influence the emerging La Tène style.

According to Ruth and Vincent Megaw, "Situla art depicts life as seen from a masculine viewpoint, in which women are servants or sex objects; most of the scenes which include humans are of the feasts in which the situlae themselves figure, of the hunt or of war". Similar scenes are found on other vessel shapes, as well as bronze belt-plaques. The processions of animals, typical of earlier examples, or humans derive from the Near East and Mediterranean.

Except for the Italian Benvenuti Situla, men are hairless, with "funny hats, dumpy bodies and big heads", though often shown looking cheerful in an engaging way. The Benvenuti Situla is also unusual in that it seems to show a specific story.

The Strettweg cult wagon from Austria (c. 600 BC) has been interpreted as representing a deer goddess or 'Great Nature Goddess' similar to Artemis.

Hallstatt culture musical instruments included harps, lyres, zithers, woodwinds, panpipes, horns, drums and rattles.

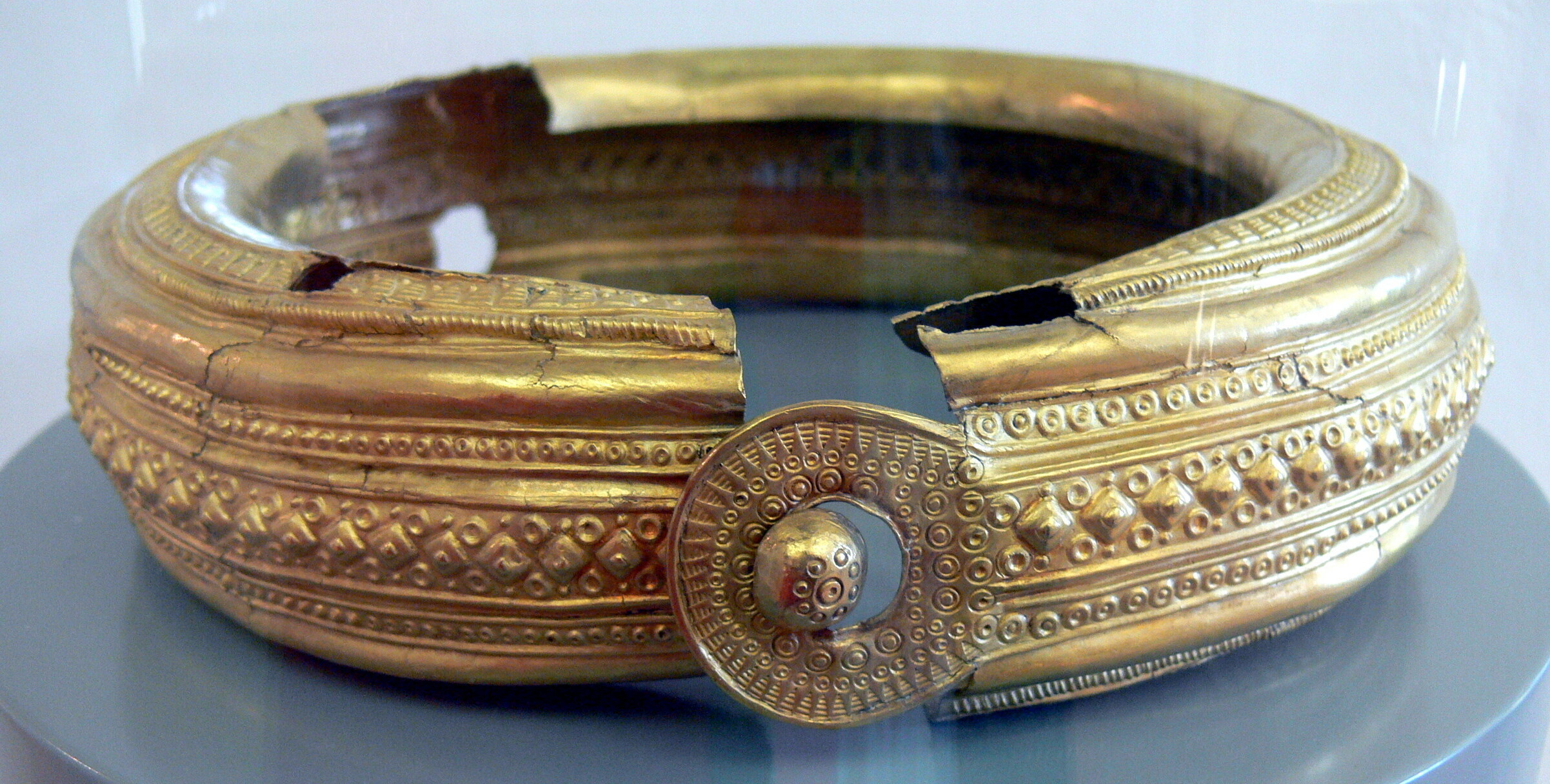
Gold collar from Austria, c. 550 BC

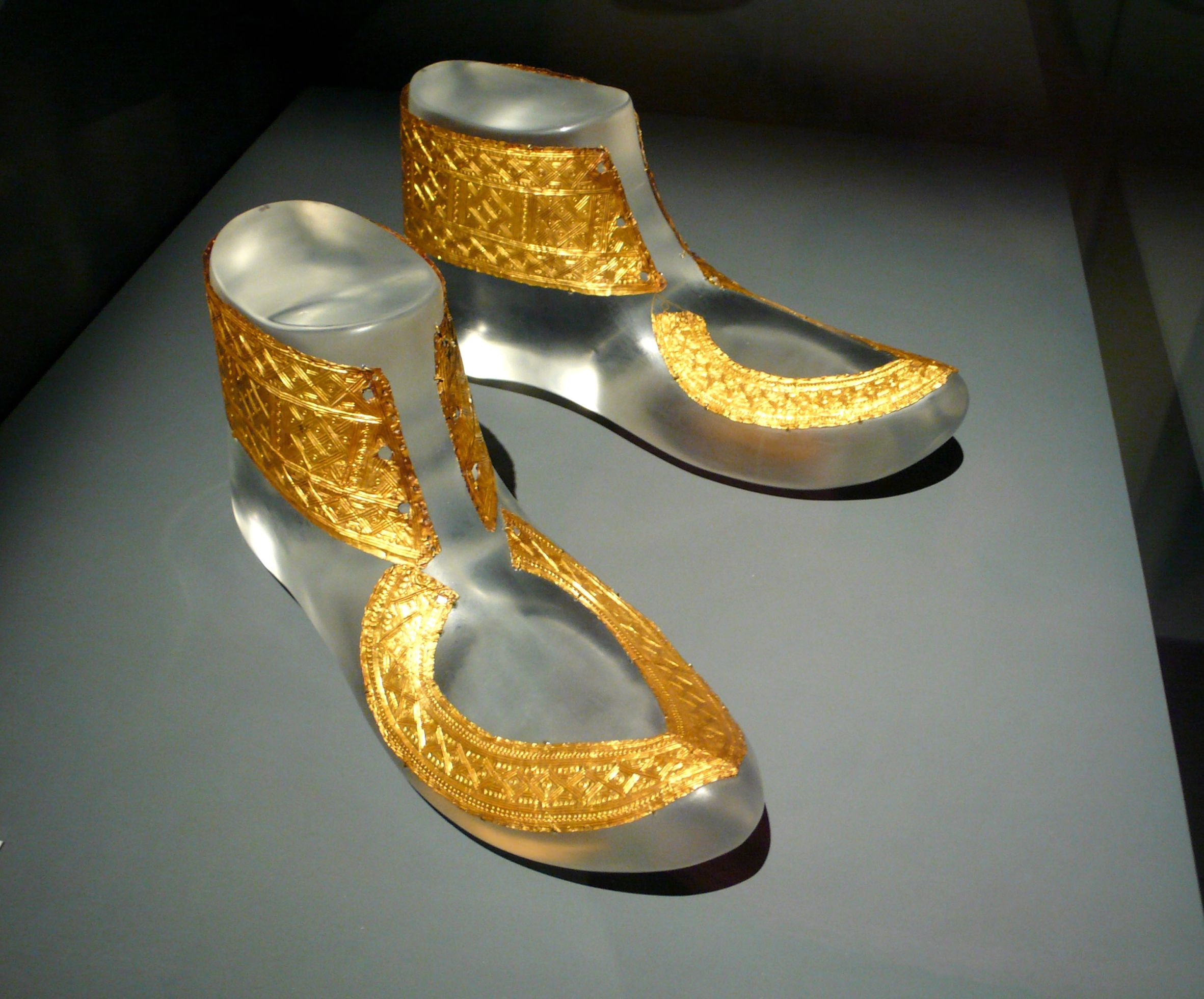
Gold shoe plaques from Hochdorf

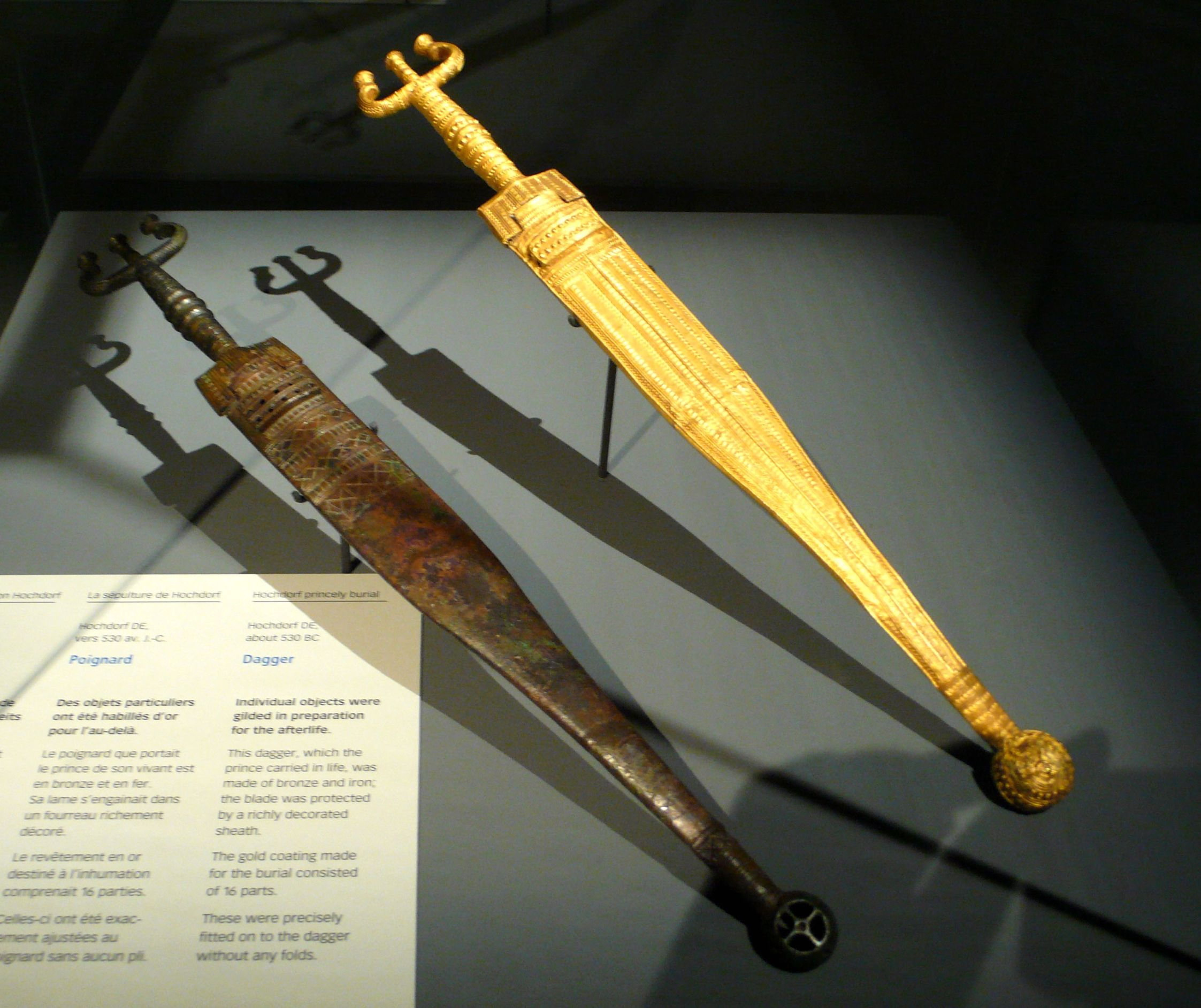
Dagger with gold foil added for burial, Hochdorf

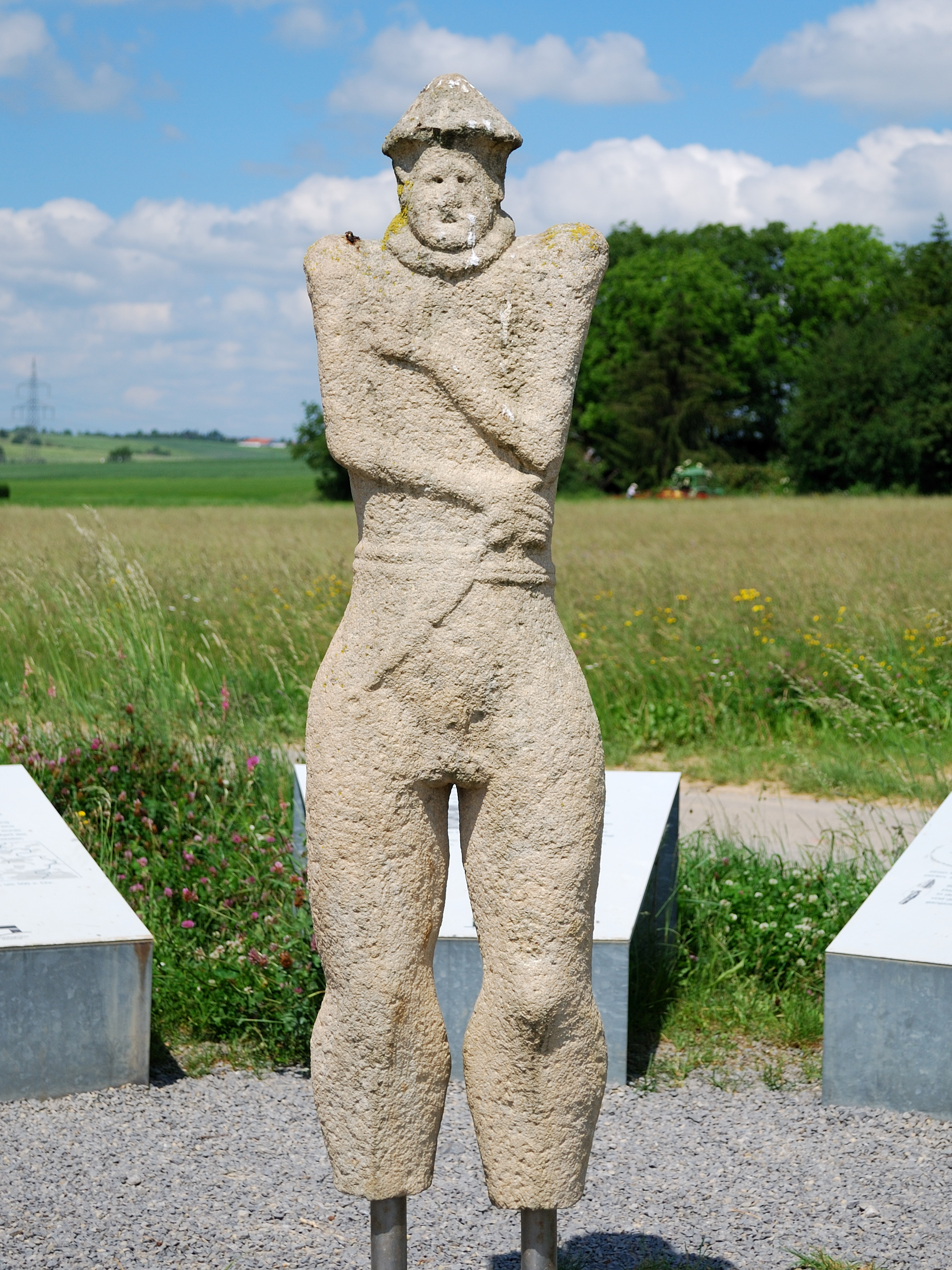
Replica of the Warrior of Hirschlanden

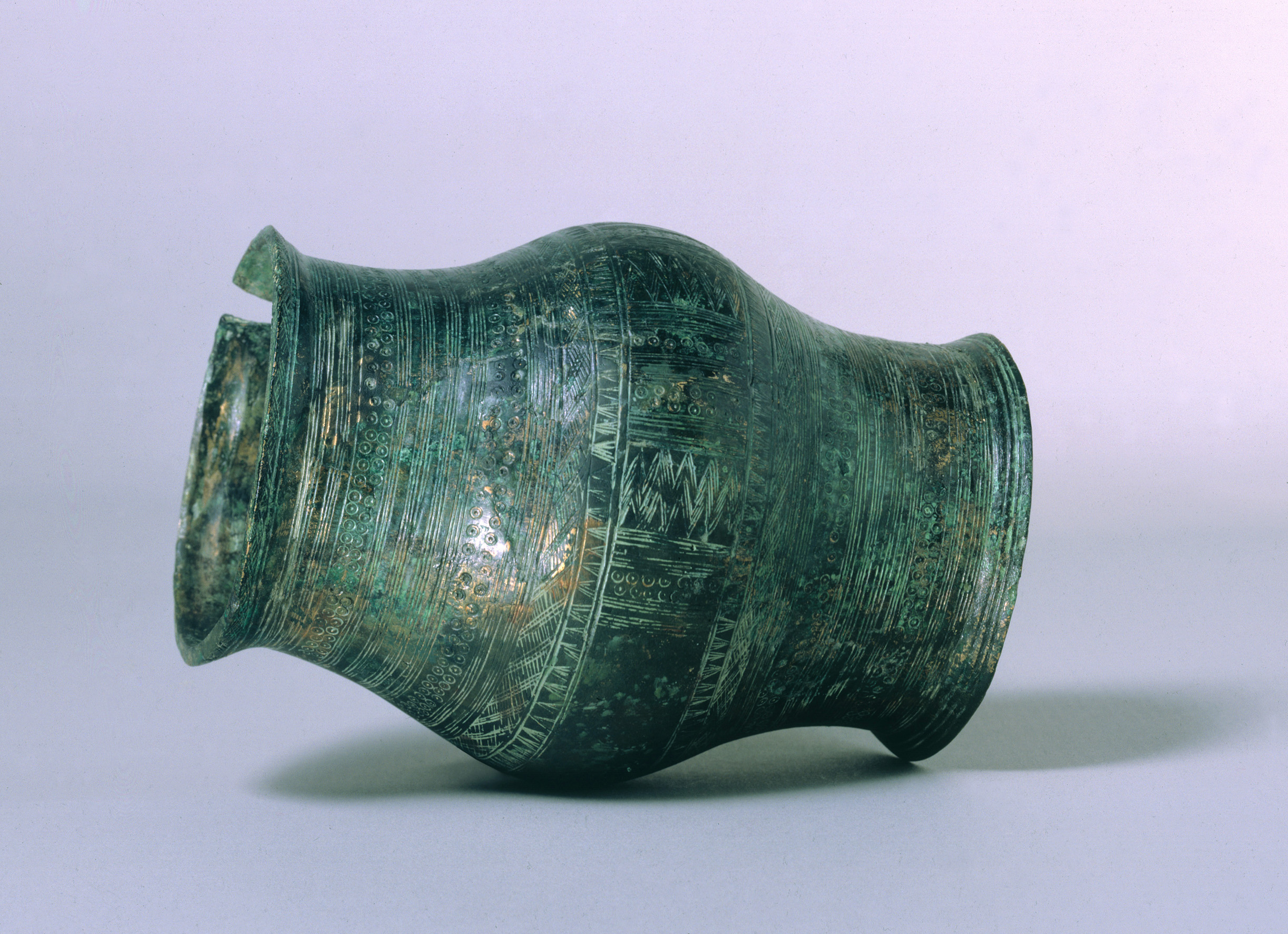
Armband with engraved decoration

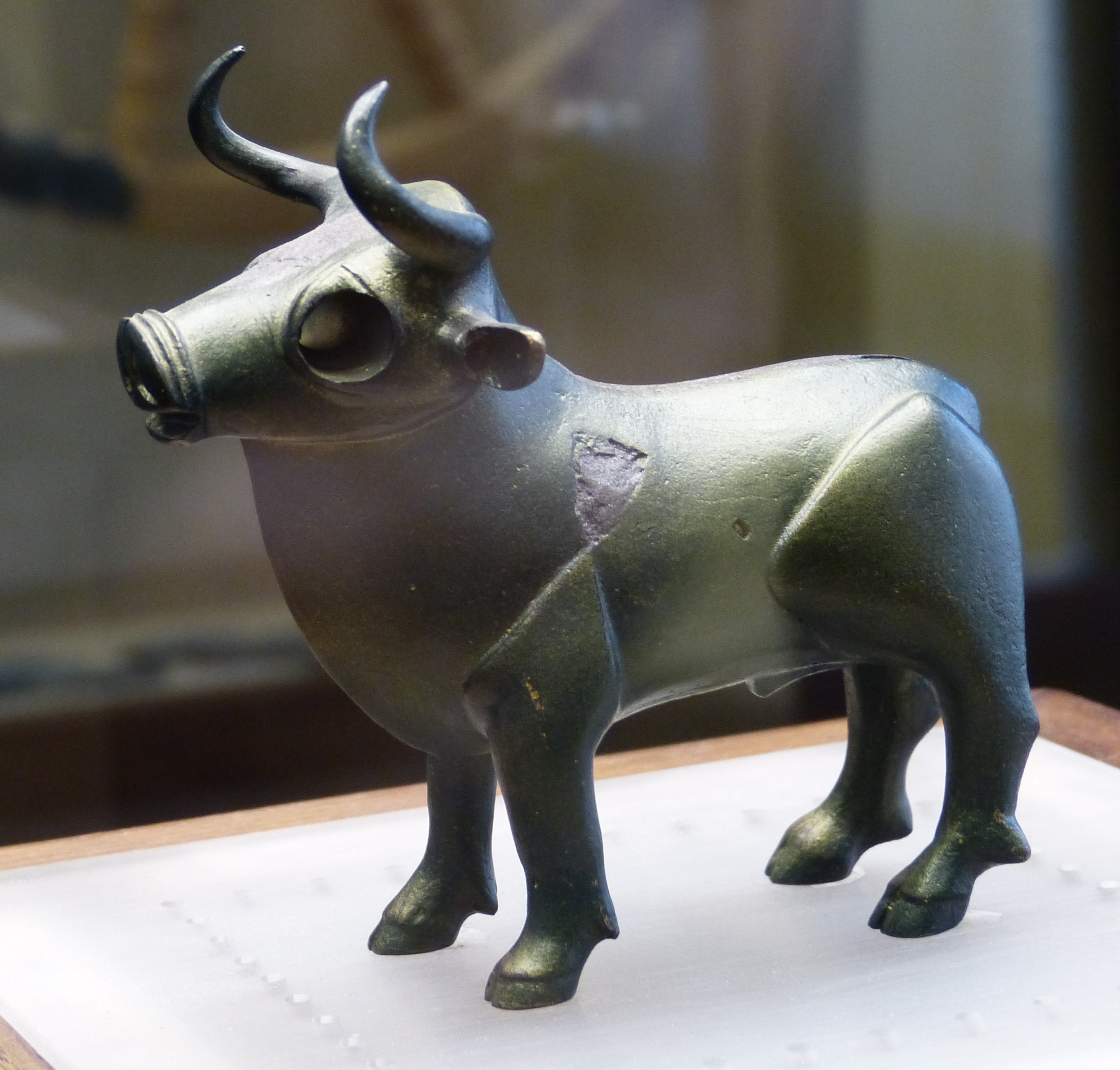
Bull from Býčí skála Cave, Czech Republic

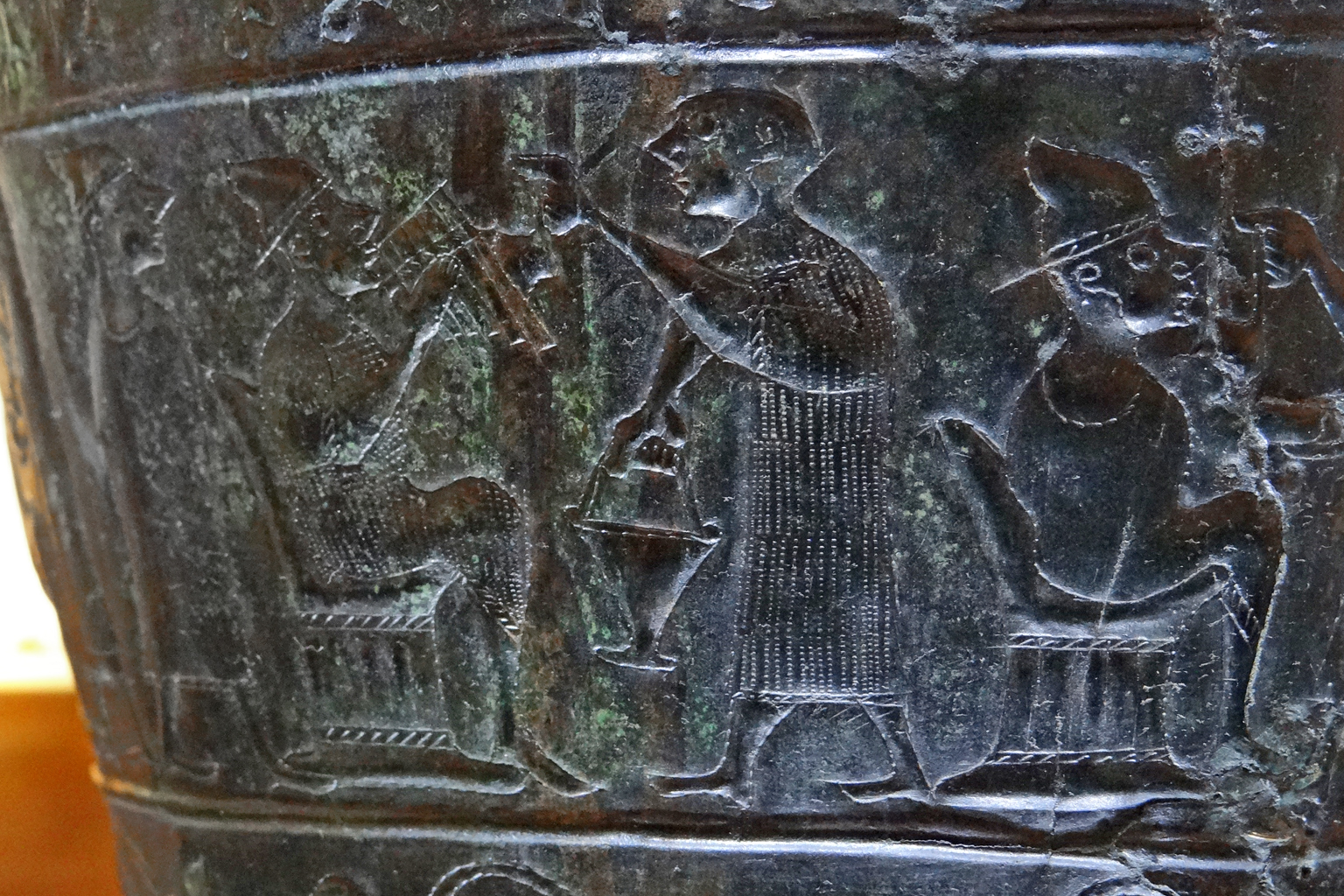
Panpipe player, from the Vače situla, Slovenia

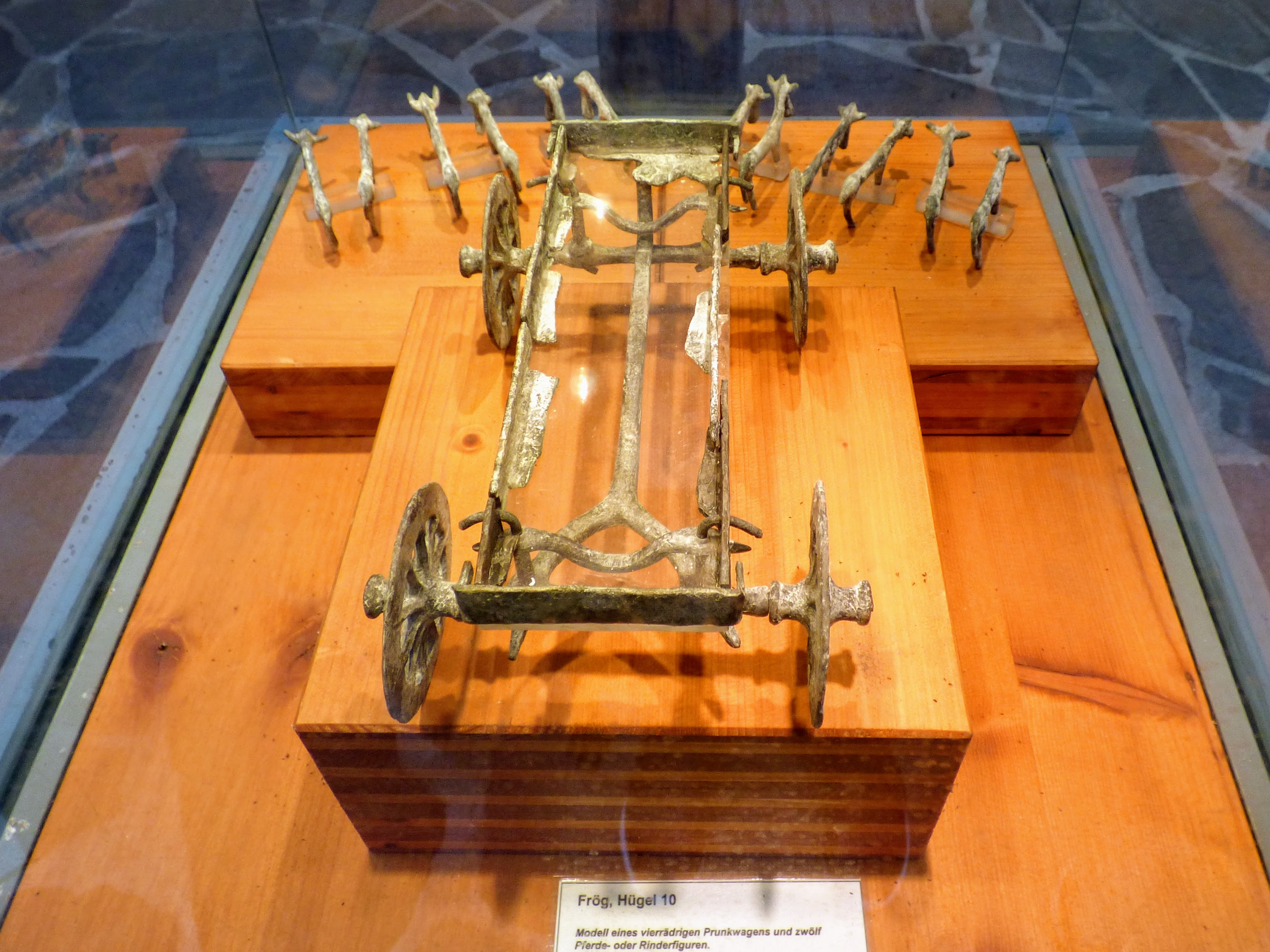
Wagon model from Frög, Austria

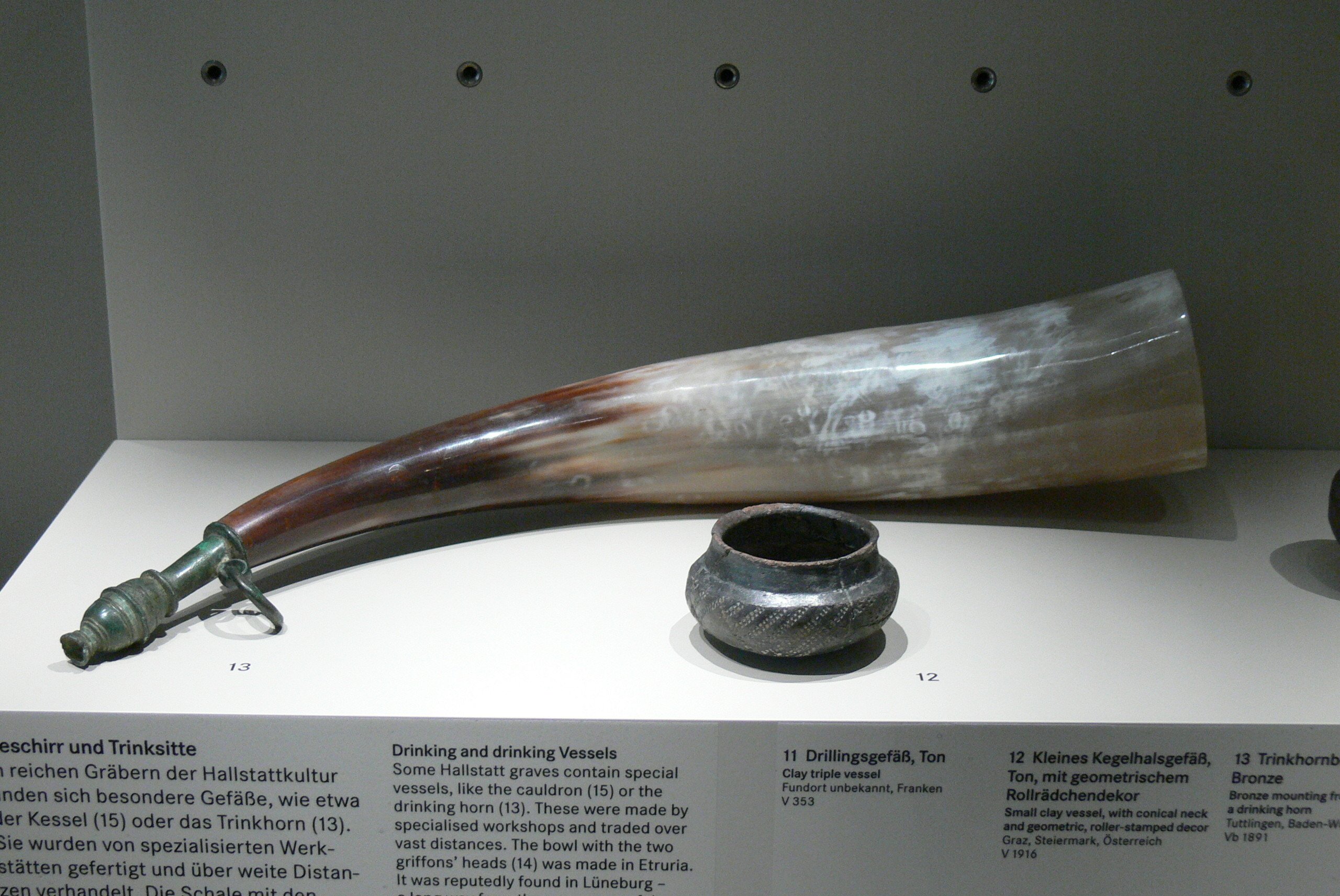
Drinking horn from Tuttlingen, Germany

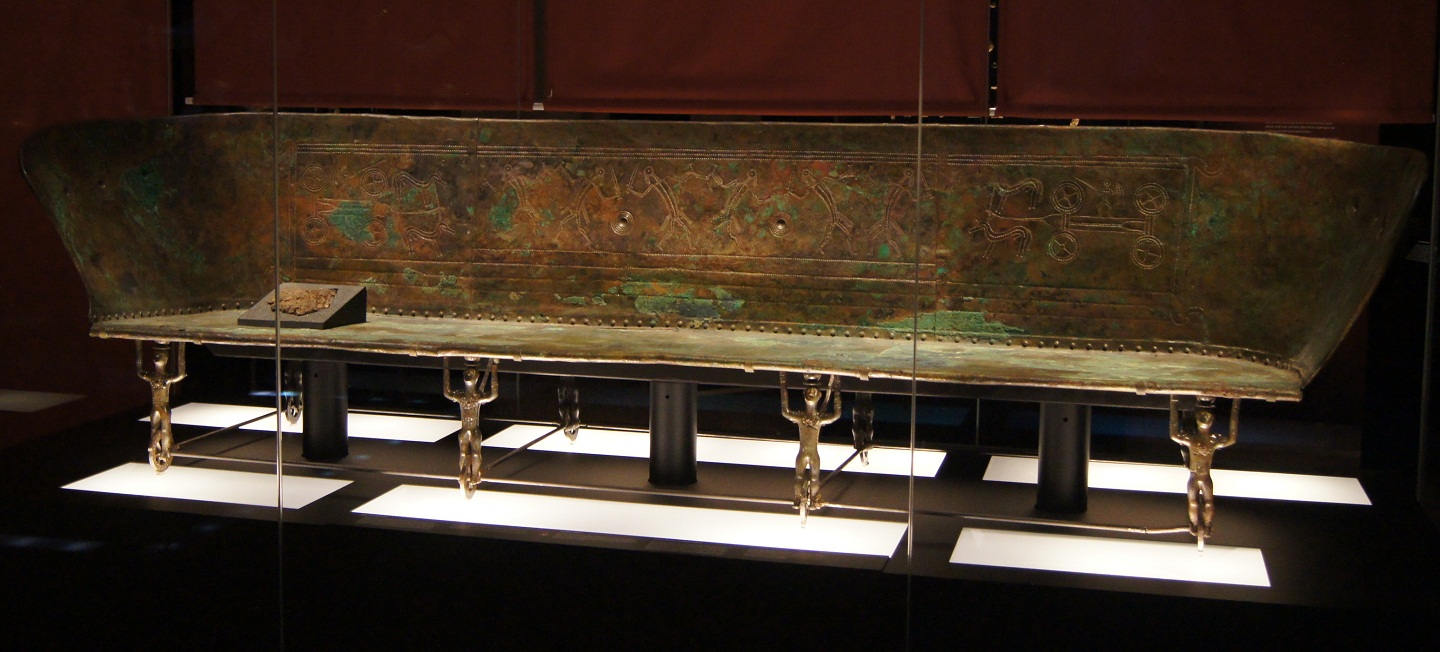
Bronze recliner from Hochdorf

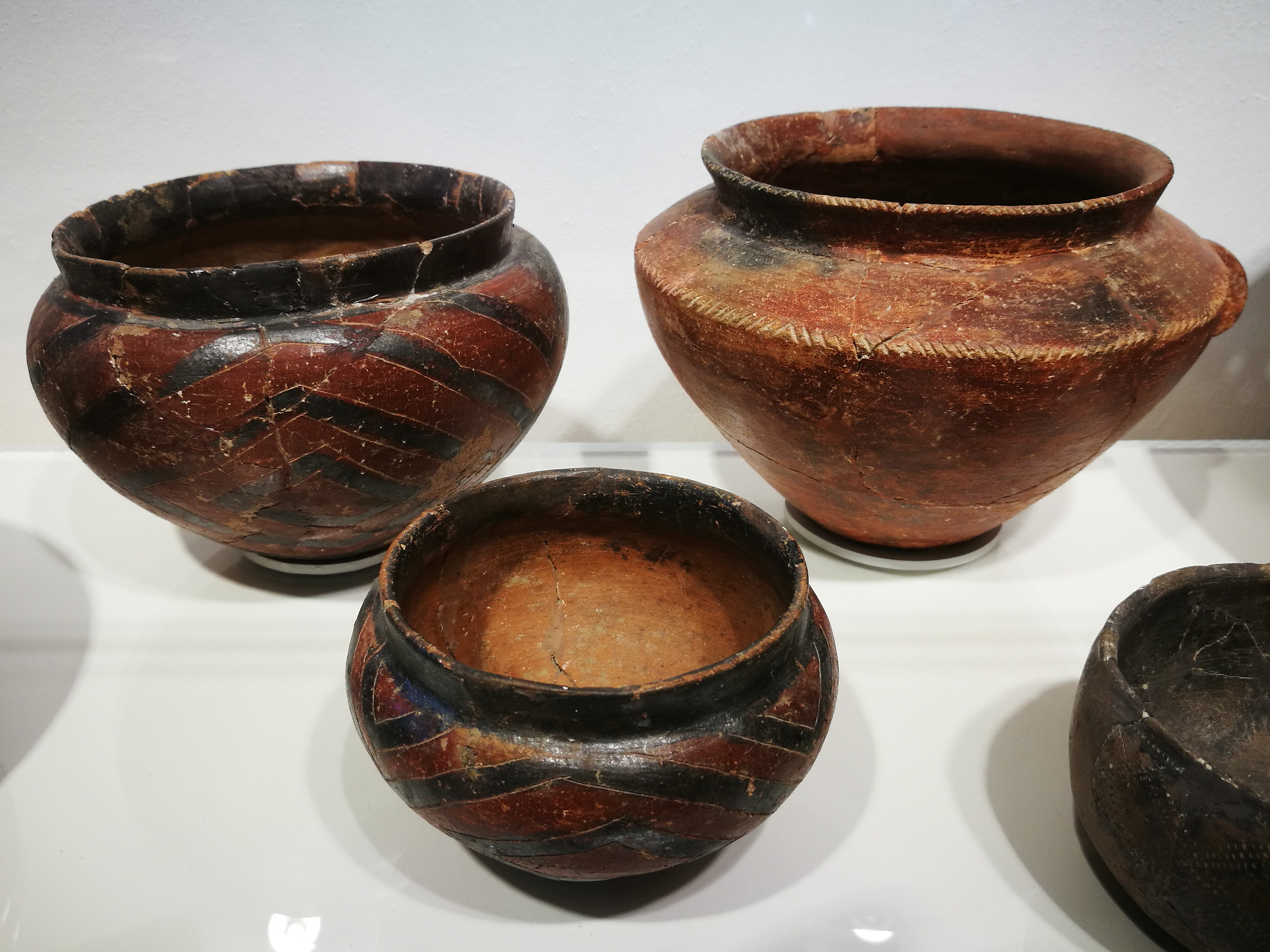
Pottery from Hegau, Germany

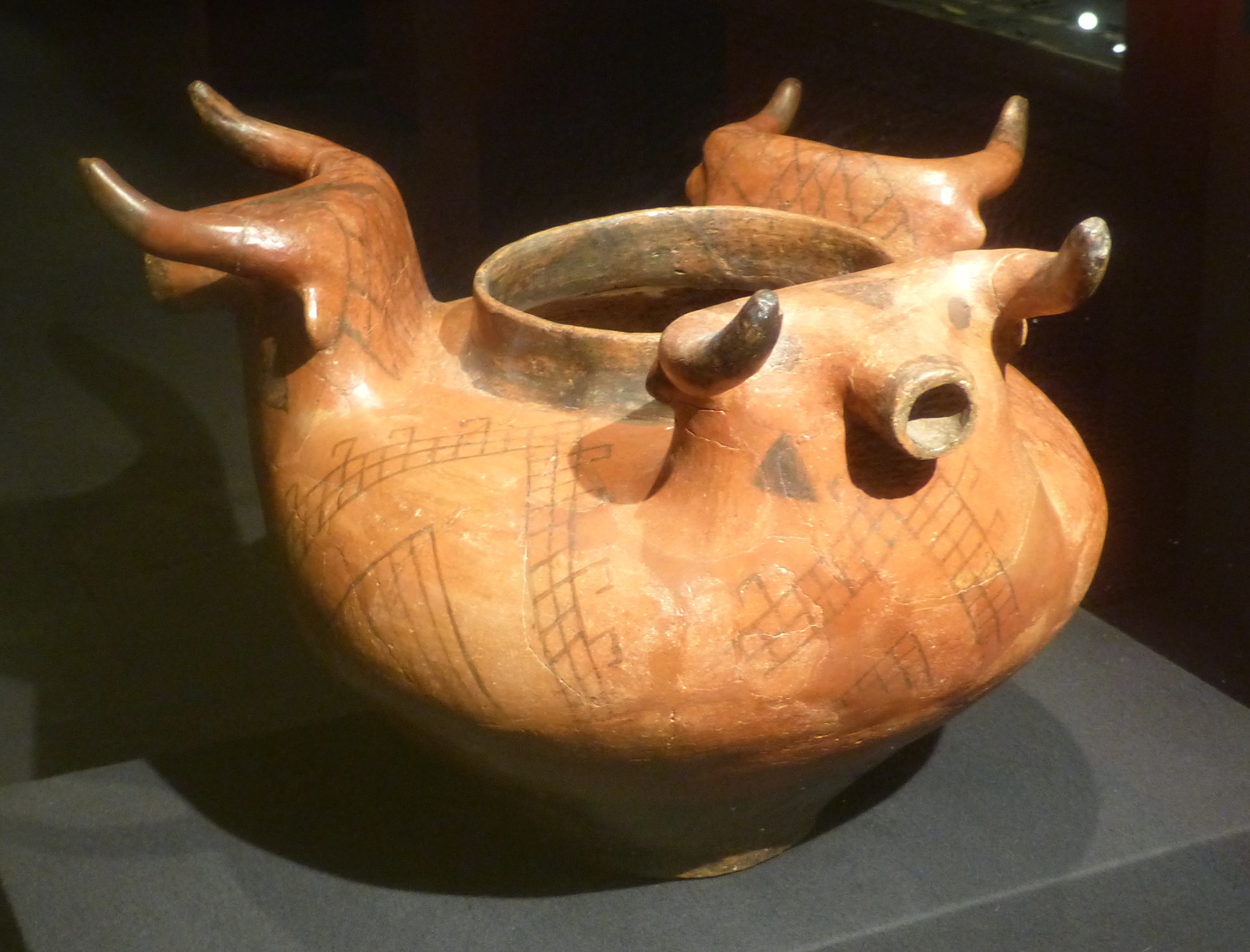
Ceramic vessel from Donnerskirchen, Austria

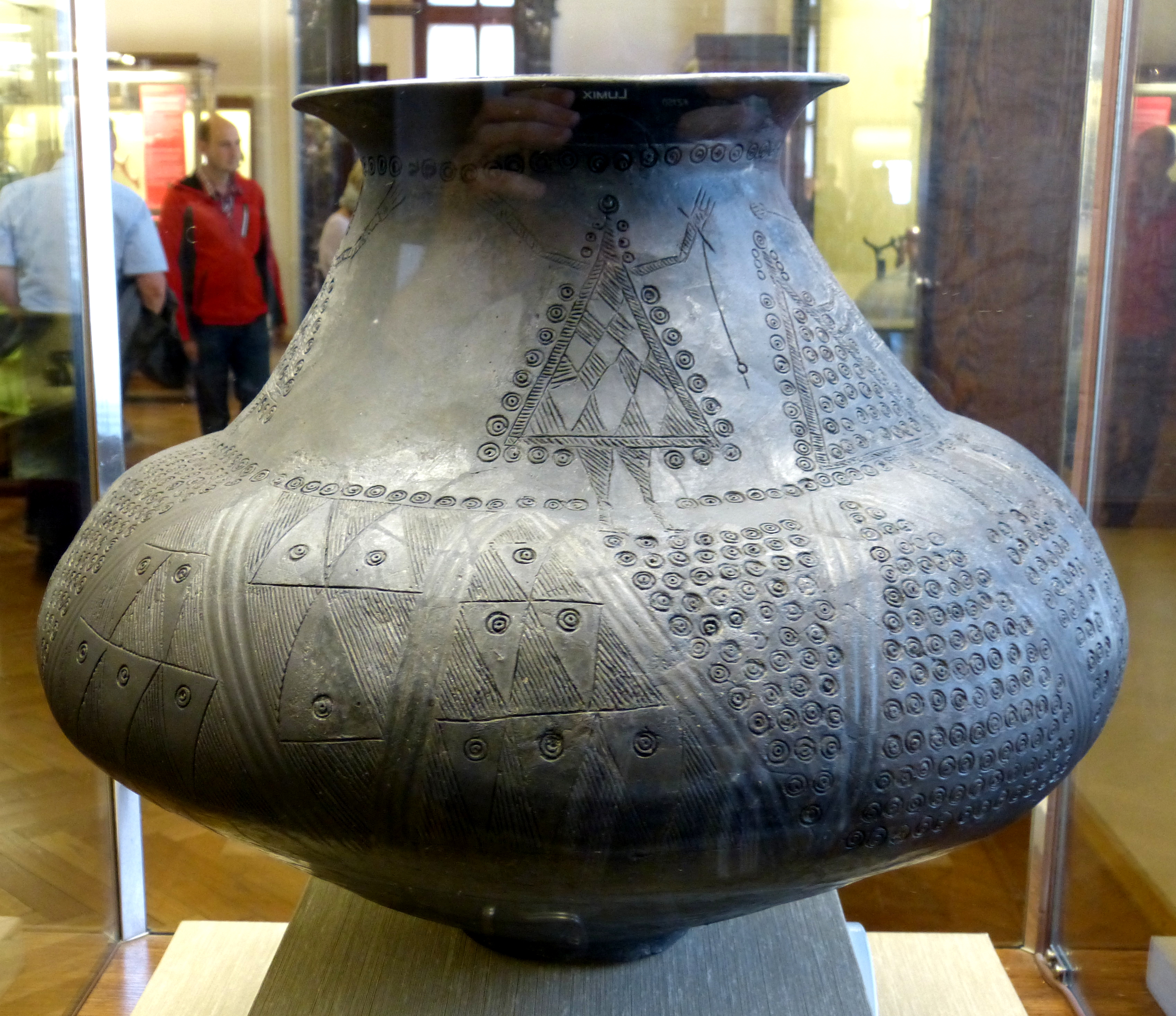
Pottery from Hungary, 7th century BC.

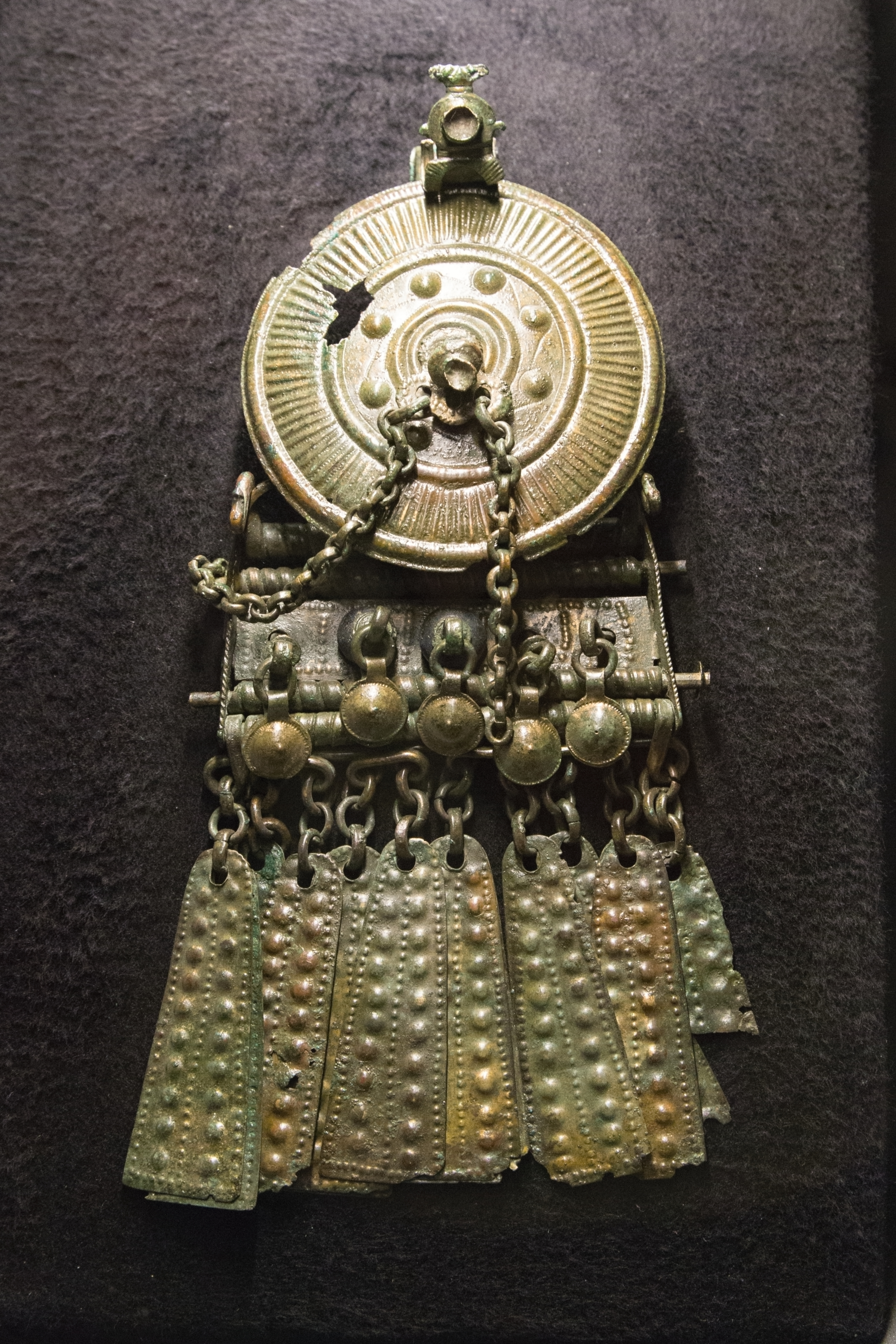
Bronze fibula brooch, late Hallstatt

== Inscriptions ==
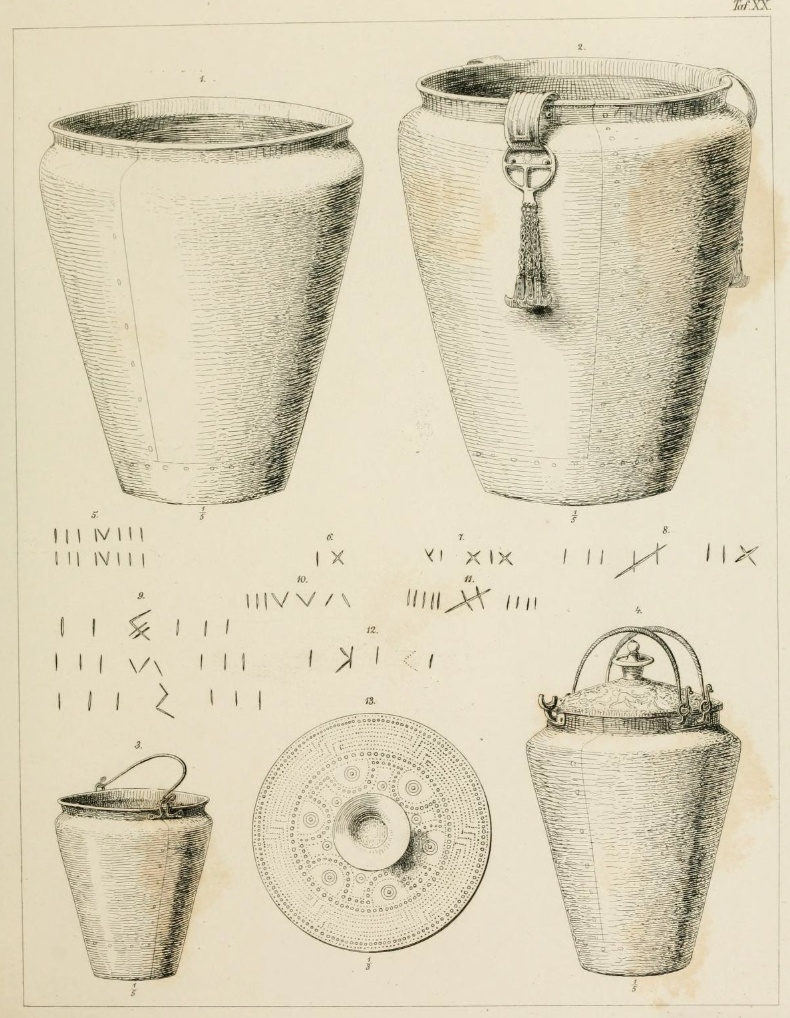
Markings on situlas from Hallstatt, c. 800-500 BC.

A small number of inscriptions have been recovered from Hallstatt culture sites. Markings or symbols inscribed on iron tools from Austria dating from the early Iron Age (Ha C, 800-650 BC) show continuity with symbols from the Bronze Age Urnfield culture, and are thought to be related to mining and the metal trade. Inscriptions engraved on situlas or cauldrons from the Hallstatt cemetery in Austria, dating from c. 800-500 BC, have been interpreted as numerals, letters and words, possibly related to Etruscan or Old Italic scripts. Weights from Bavaria dating from the 7th to early 6th century BC bear signs possibly resembling Greek or Etruscan letters. A single-word inscription (possibly a name) on a locally produced ceramic sherd from Montmorot in eastern France, dating from the late 7th to mid-6th century BC, has been identified as either Gaulish or Lepontic, written in either a 'proto-Lepontic' or Etruscan alphabet. A fragment of an inscription painted on local pottery has also been recovered from the late Hallstatt site of Bragny-sur-Saône in eastern France, dating from the 5th century BC. A letter inscribed on a gold cup was deposited in a princely tomb at Apremont in eastern France, dating from c. 500 BC.

Another fragmentary inscription on pottery was found in a princely burial near Bergères-les-Vertus in north-eastern France, dating from late 5th century BC (at the beginning of La Tène A). The inscription has been identified as the Celtic word for "king", written in the Lepontic alphabet. According to Olivier (2010), "this graffito represents one of the earliest attested occurrences of the word rîx which designates the "king" in the Celtic languages. ... It would also seem to represent the first co-occurrence in the Celtic world of a funerary archaeological context and a contemporaneous linguistic qualification as 'royal'." According to Verger (1998) the 7th-6th century BC inscription from Montmorot "is at the beginning of a still limited series of documents attesting to the use of alphabetic signs and the use of writing in Eastern Gaul during the entire period characterised by the appearance, development and end of the Hallstattian 'princely phenomenon'. ... The first transmission of the alphabet north of the Alps, at the end of the 7th or in the first half of the 6th century, seems to be only the beginning of a process that was regularly renewed until the second half of the fifth century."

== Calendar ==
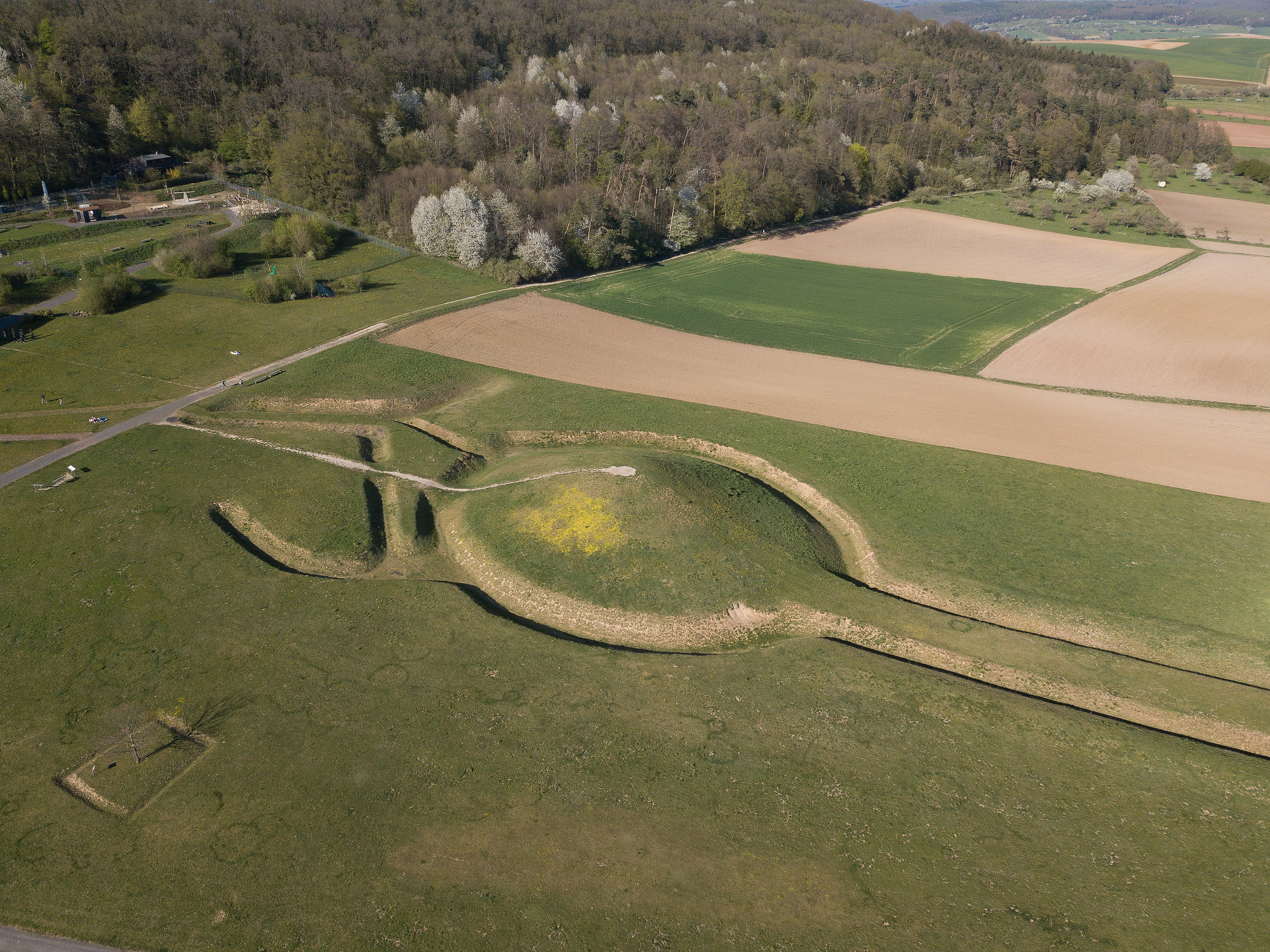
Glauberg burial mound, earthworks and 'processional road' (right)

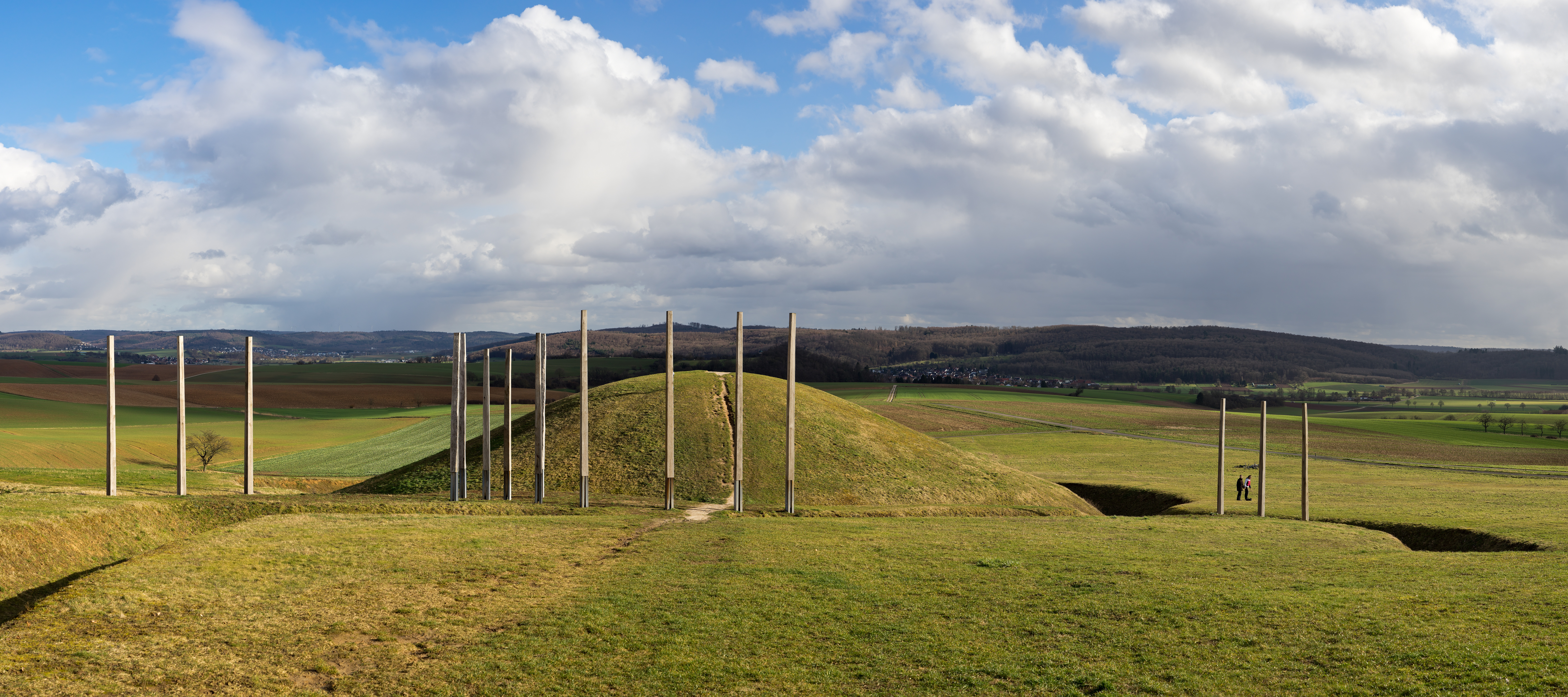
Glauberg burial mound and reconstructed posts

The monumental burial mounds at Glauberg and Magdalenenberg in Germany featured structures aligned with the point of the major lunar standstill, which occurs every 18.6 years. At Glauberg this took the form of a 'processional avenue' lined by large ditches, whilst at Magdalenenberg the alignment was marked with a large timber palisade. The knowledge required to create these alignments would have required long-term observation of the skies, possibly over several generations. At Glauberg other ditches and postholes associated with the mound may have been used to observe astronomical phenomena such as the solstices, with the whole ensemble functioning as a calendar. According to the archaeologist Allard Mees, the numerous burials within the Magdalenenberg mound were positioned to mirror the constellations as they appeared at the time of the summer solstice in 618 BC. Mees argues that the Magdalenenberg represented a lunar calendar and that knowledge of the 18.6 year lunar standstill cycle would have enabled the prediction of lunar eclipses. According to Mees many other burial mounds in this period were also aligned with lunar phenomena. An analysis of Hallstatt period burials by Müller-Scheeßel (2005) similarly suggested that they were oriented towards specific constellations. According to Gaspani (1998) the diagonals of the rectangular Hochdorf burial chamber were also aligned with the major lunar standstill.

Further evidence for knowledge of lunar eclipse cycles in this period comes from Fiskerton in England, where an analysis of a wooden causeway used to make ritual depositions into the Witham river found that the causeway timbers were felled at intervals corresponding to Saros lunar eclipse cycles, indicating that the builders were able to predict these cycles in advance. According to the archaeologists who studied this site, similar evidence can be found at other locations in the British Isles and Central Europe dating from the Late Bronze Age through to the Late Iron Age, suggesting that knowledge of lunar eclipse cycles may have been widespread in this period. Knowledge of Saros cycles may also be numerically encoded on the Late Bronze Age Berlin Gold Hat.

The mountain peaks around Hallstatt may have also functioned as a large sundial and visual calendar. A similar system is thought to have existed in the Vosges mountains during the Iron Age (the Belchen system) which incorporated dates associated with major Celtic festivals such as Beltane.

Kruta (2010) interprets a large decorated brooch from Hallstatt, dating from the 6th century BC, as representing a simple calendar or "symbolic summary of the course of the year". Depictions on the brooch of waterfowl (representing night and winter) and horses (representing day and summer) are placed above a solar boat (representing the sun's journey from one winter solstice to the next), whilst twelve circular pendants represent the lunar months.

According to Garrett Olmsted (2001) the Celtic Coligny calendar, dating from the 1st-2nd centuries AD, has origins dating back to the Hallstatt period or Late Bronze Age, indicating that calendrical knowledge was transmitted through a long oral tradition.

The archaeologist Stuart Piggott has suggested that elite individuals such as the Lady of Vix and the Hochdorf chieftain could be a representative of a priestly class and possible forerunners of the druids of the later Iron Age, who were described by classical authors as having a knowledge of astronomy that was passed down orally through memorisation and recitation. The archaeologist Barry Cunliffe has similarly suggested that the origins of the druids may date back to the Bronze Age.

A 5th century BC sandstone statue from Glauberg may depict a ruler who also held the role of priest or druid. He is depicted with type of short sword that has been found at a number of contemporary sites across central and western Europe, which feature inlaid lunar symbols on their blades that are thought to represent different stages of the lunar cycle or lunar eclipses, and have been associated with a class of priests or druids. Similarities between these symbols and the later Coligny calendar have also been suggested. Some of these swords have also been compared to the much earlier Nebra Sky Disc associated with the Early Bronze Age Únětice culture.

== Geography ==
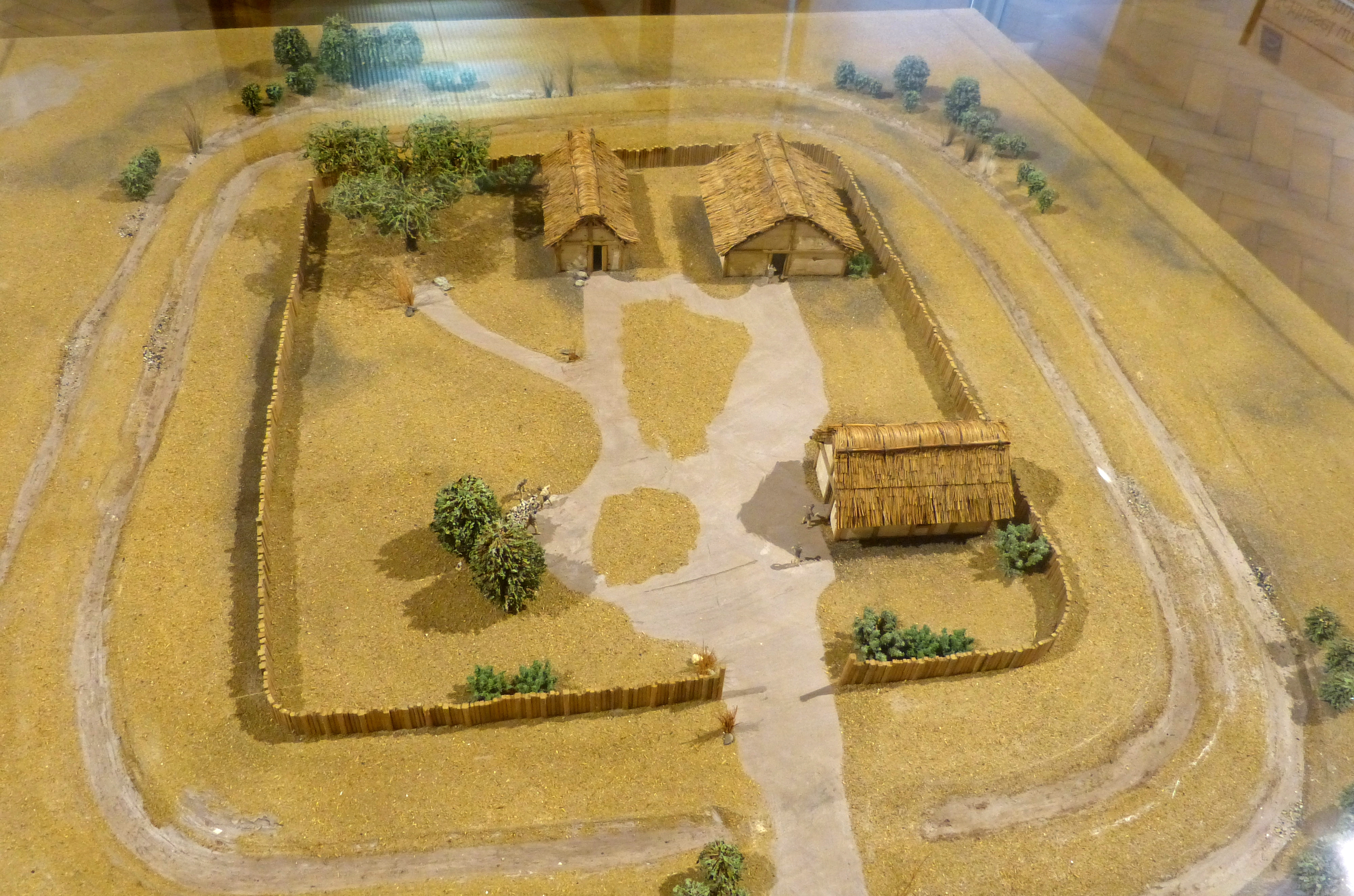
Model of a Hallstatt era farm, Gäuboden Museum

Two culturally distinct areas, an eastern and a western zone are generally recognised. There are distinctions in burial rites, the types of grave goods, and in artistic style. In the western zone, members of the elite were buried with sword (HaC) or dagger (HaD), in the eastern zone with an axe. The western zone has chariot burials. In the eastern zone, warriors are frequently buried with helmet and a plate armour breastplate. Artistic subjects with a narrative component are only found in the east, in both pottery and metalwork. In the east the settlements and cemeteries can be larger than in the west.

The approximate division line between the two subcultures runs from north to south through central Bohemia and Lower Austria at about 14 to 15 degrees eastern longitude, and then traces the eastern and southern rim of the Alps to Eastern and Southern Tyrol.

=== Western Hallstatt zone ===
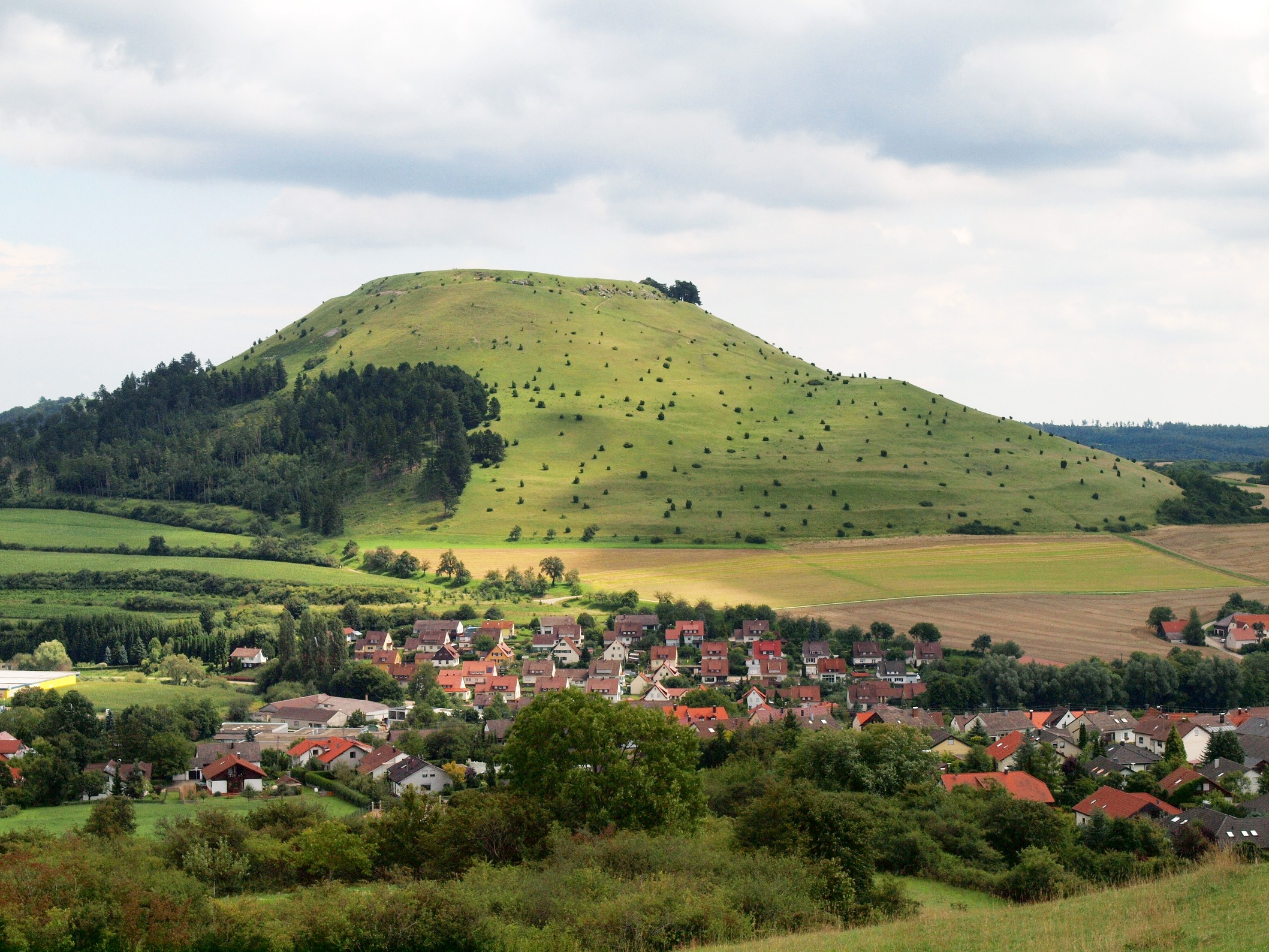
Ipf hillfort in Germany

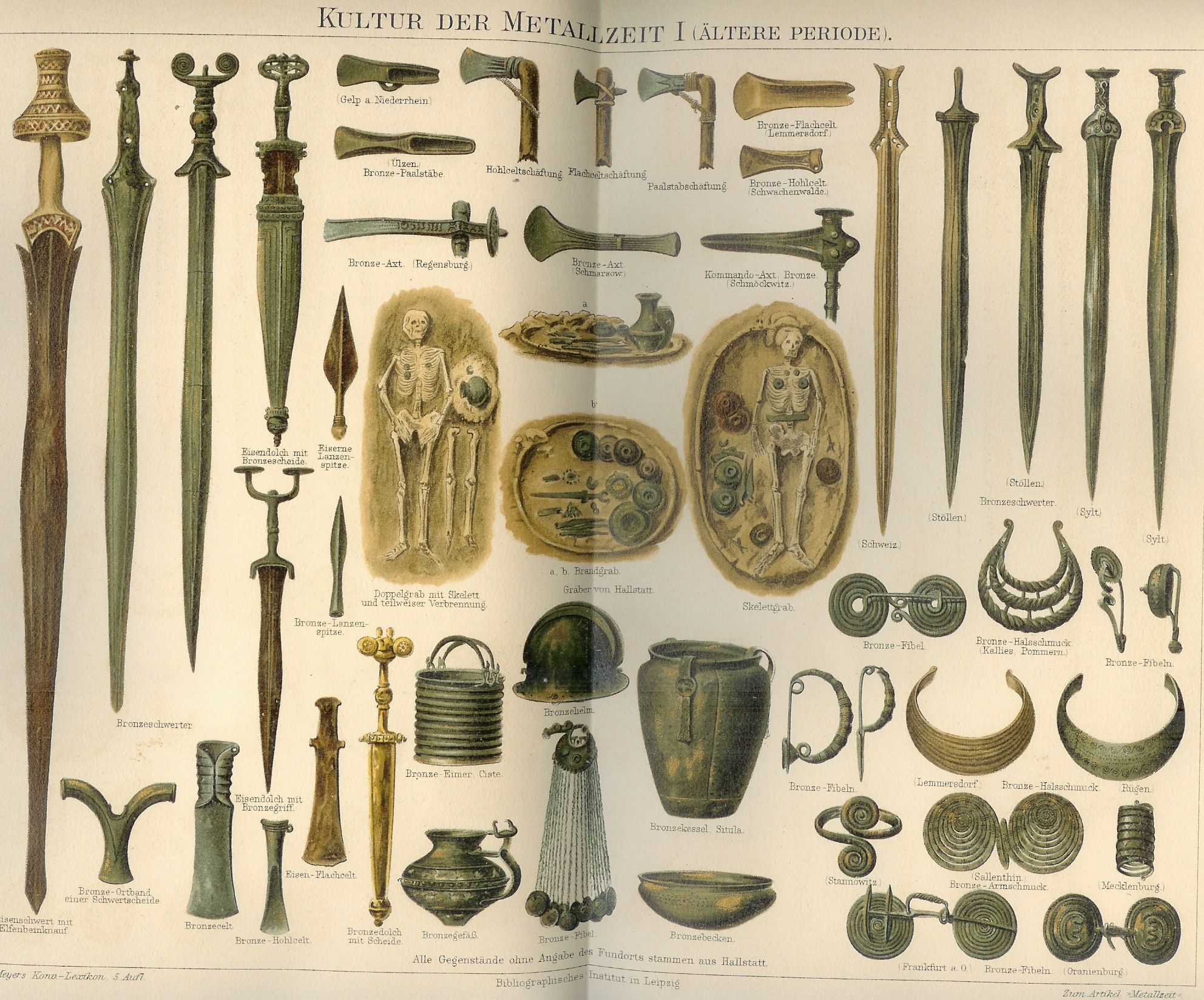
Hallstatt culture finds

Taken at its most generous extent, the western Hallstatt zone includes:

- northeastern France: Burgundy, Franche-Comté, Champagne-Ardenne, Lorraine, Alsace
- northern Switzerland: Swiss Plateau
- Southern Germany: much of Swabia and Bavaria
- western Czech Republic: Bohemia
- western Austria: Vorarlberg, Tyrol, Salzkammergut

West Hallstatt influence is also later perceptible in the rest of France, in England and Ireland, in northern Italy and in central, northern and western Iberia.

While Hallstatt is regarded as the dominant settlement of the western zone, a settlement at the Burgstallkogel in the central Sulm valley (southern Styria, west of Leibnitz, Austria) was a major centre during the Hallstatt C period. Parts of the huge necropolis (which originally consisted of more than 1,100 tumuli) surrounding this settlement can be seen today near Gleinstätten, and the chieftain's mounds were on the other side of the hill, near Kleinklein. The finds are mostly in the Landesmuseum Joanneum at Graz, which also holds the Strettweg Cult Wagon.

=== Eastern Hallstatt zone ===
The eastern Hallstatt zone includes:

- eastern Austria: Lower Austria, Upper Styria
- eastern Czech Republic: Moravia
- southwestern Slovakia: Danubian Lowland
- western Hungary: Little Hungarian Plain
- eastern Slovenia: Hallstatt Archaeological Site in Vače (at the border between Lower Styria and Lower Carniola regions), Novo Mesto
- western Slovenia: Svetolucijska Hallstatt culture Most na Soči, Notranjsko kraška Slovene Littoral
- northern Croatia: Hrvatsko Zagorje, Istria
- northern and central Serbia
- parts of southwestern Poland
- northern and western Bulgaria

Trade, cultural diffusion, and some population movements spread the Hallstatt cultural complex (western form) into Britain, and Ireland.

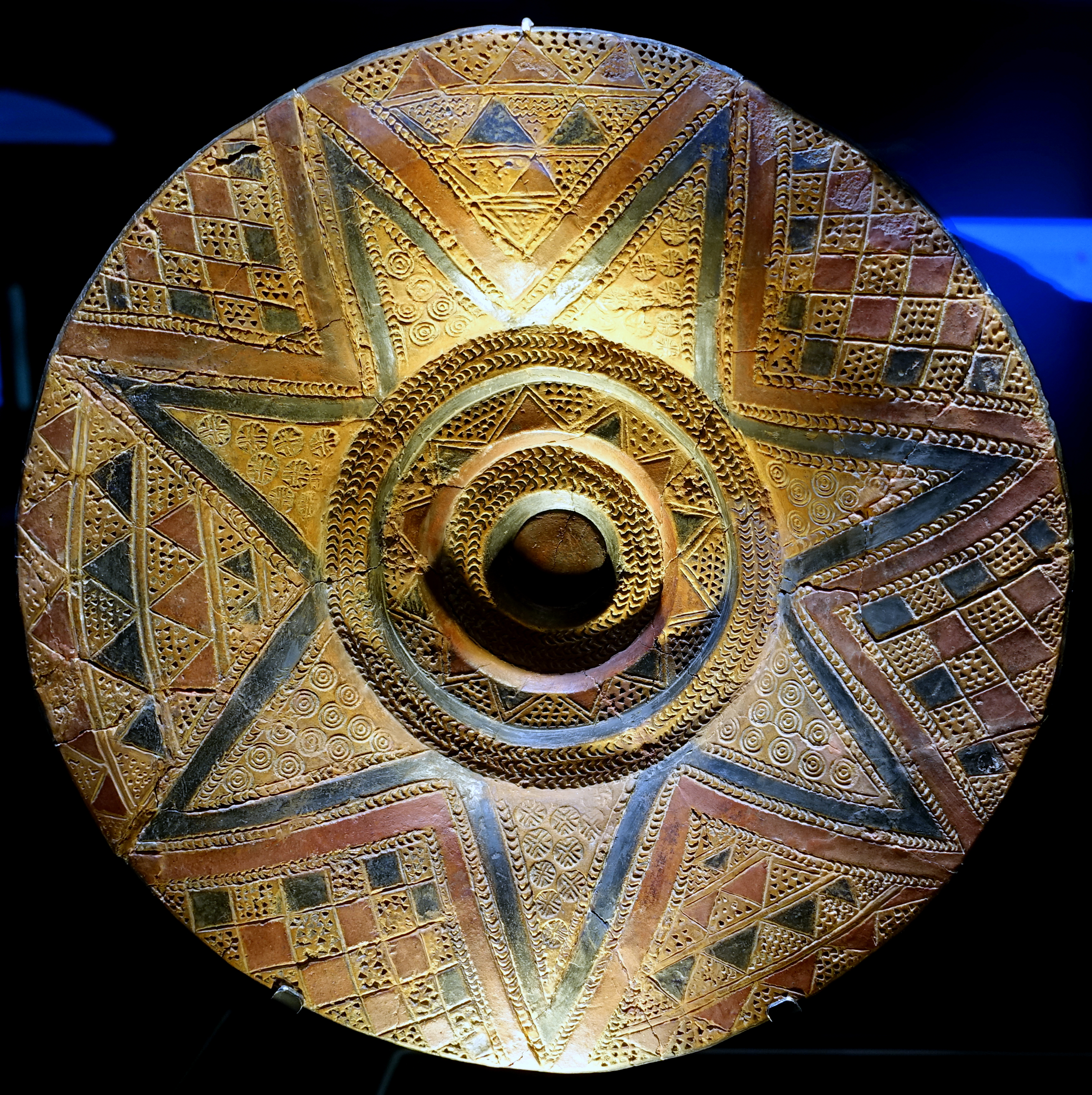
Ceramic plate, 8th-7th century BC

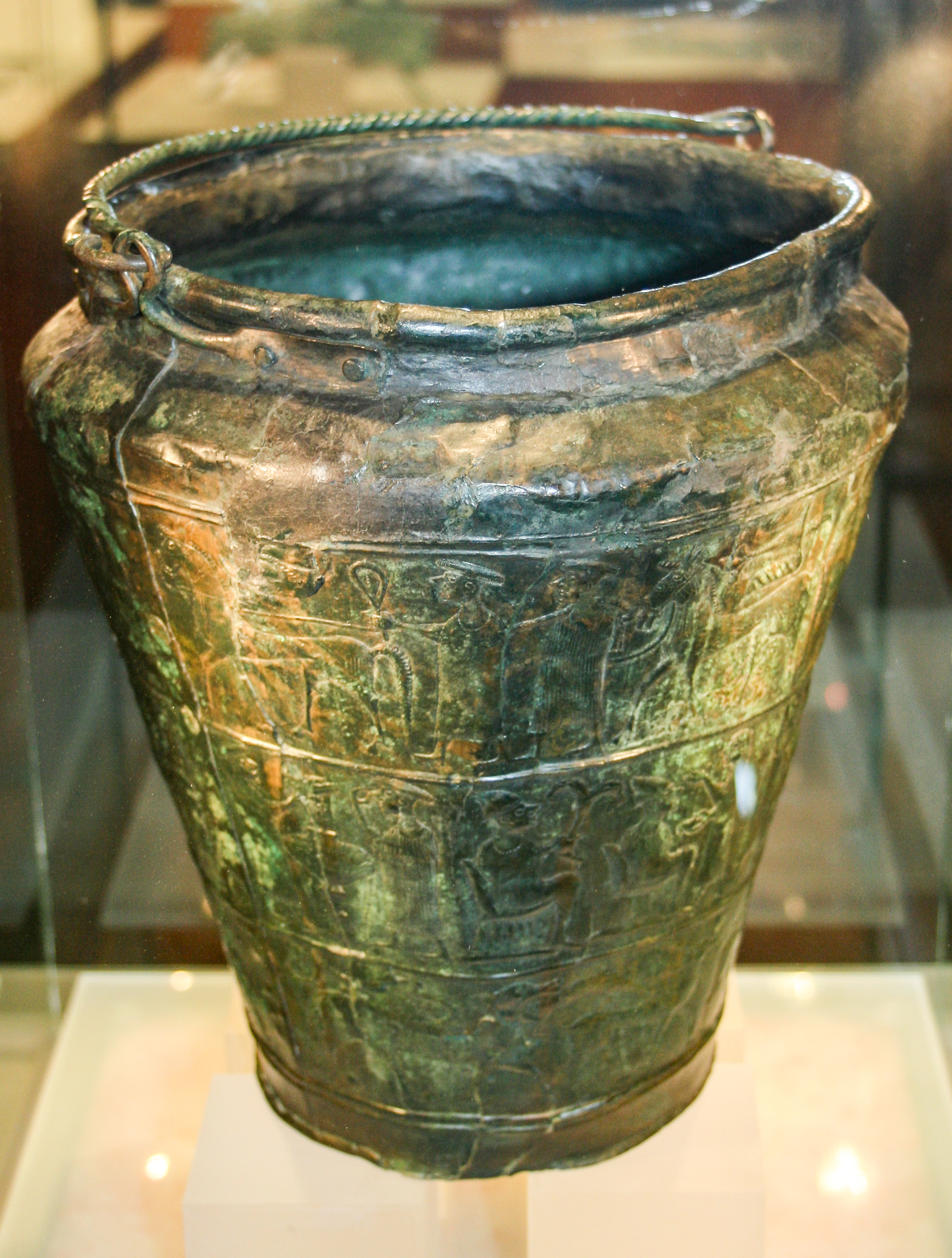
The Vače Situla, Slovenia

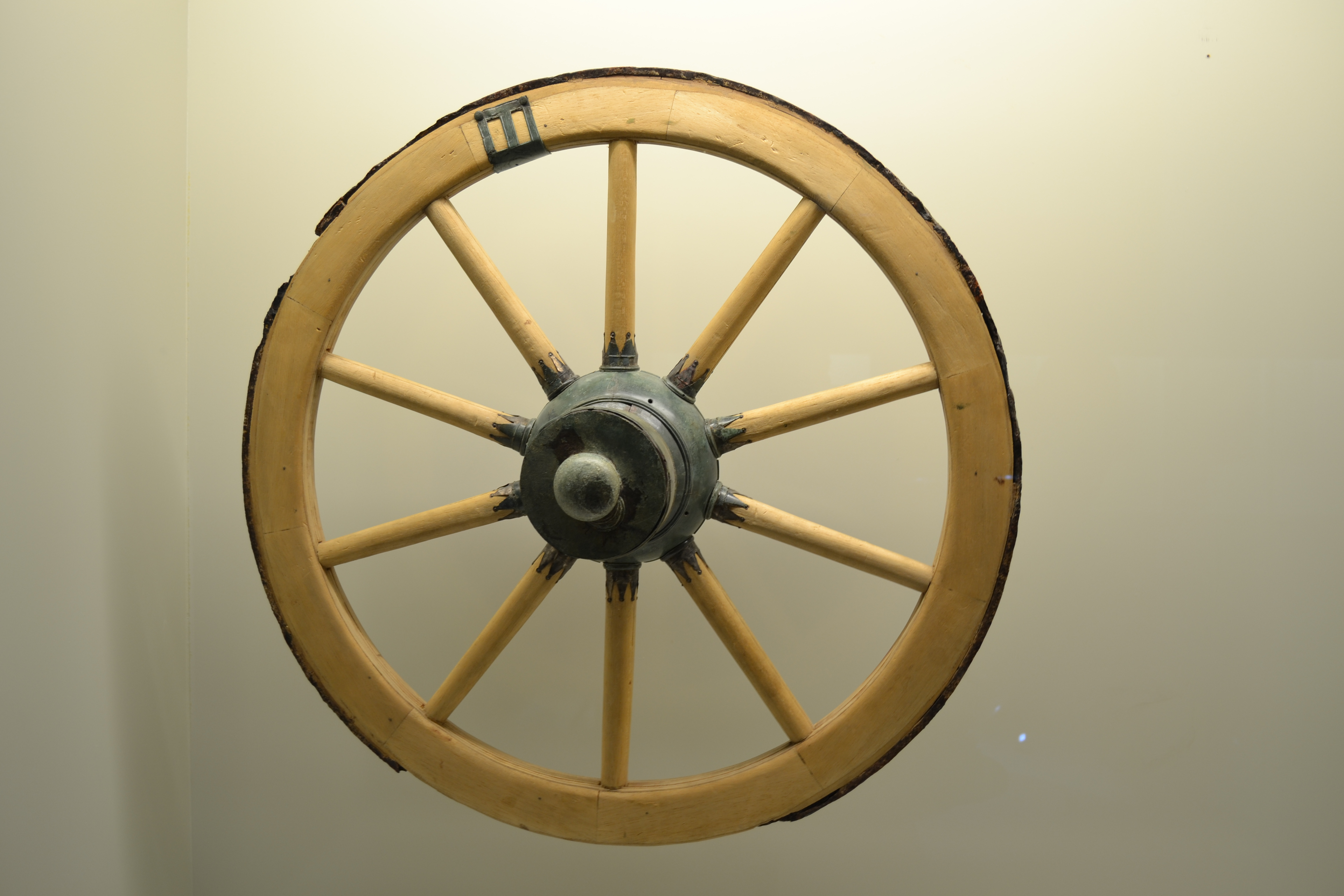
Wagon wheel, Vix Grave, France

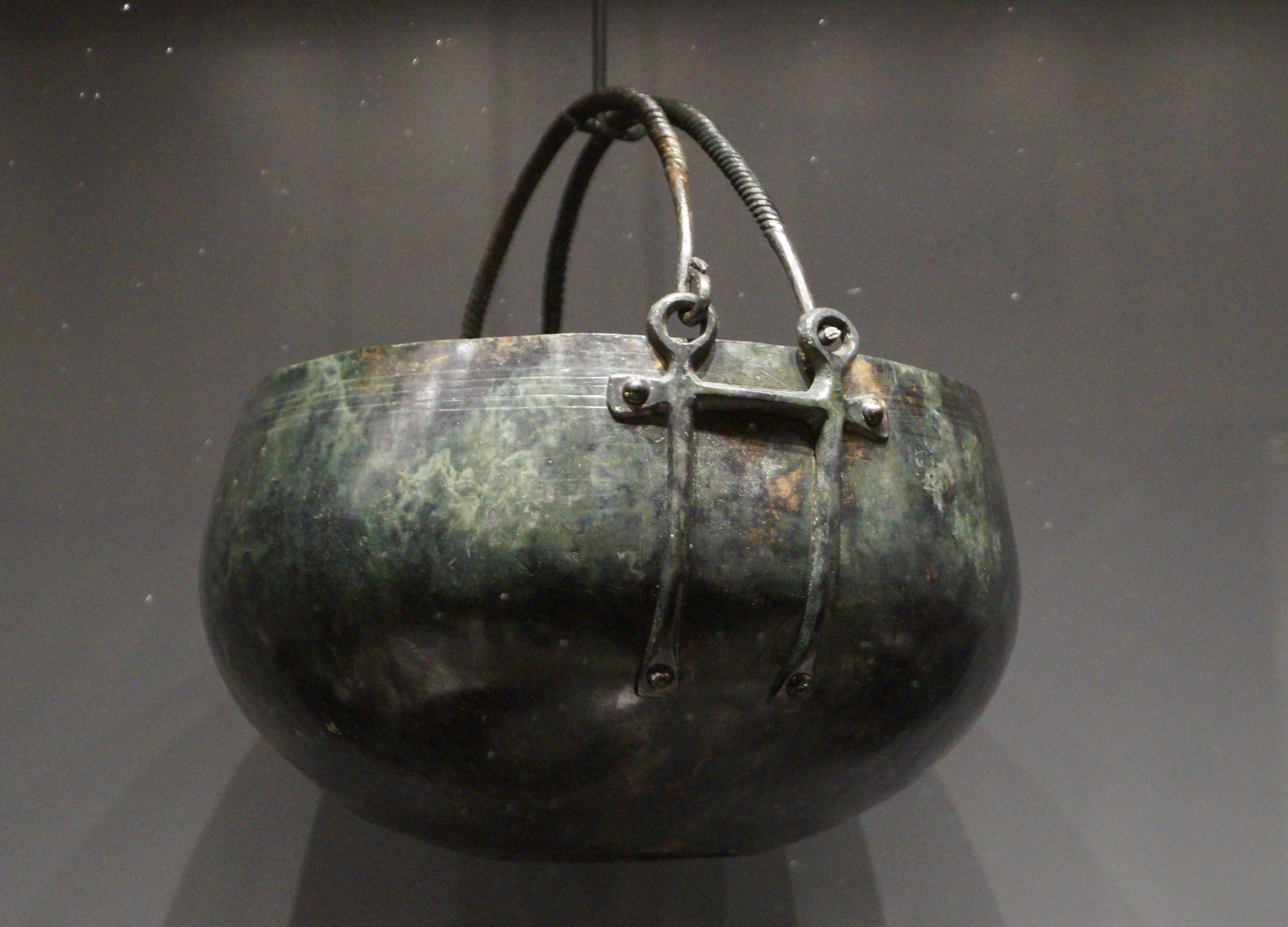
Bronze cauldron, c. 800 BC

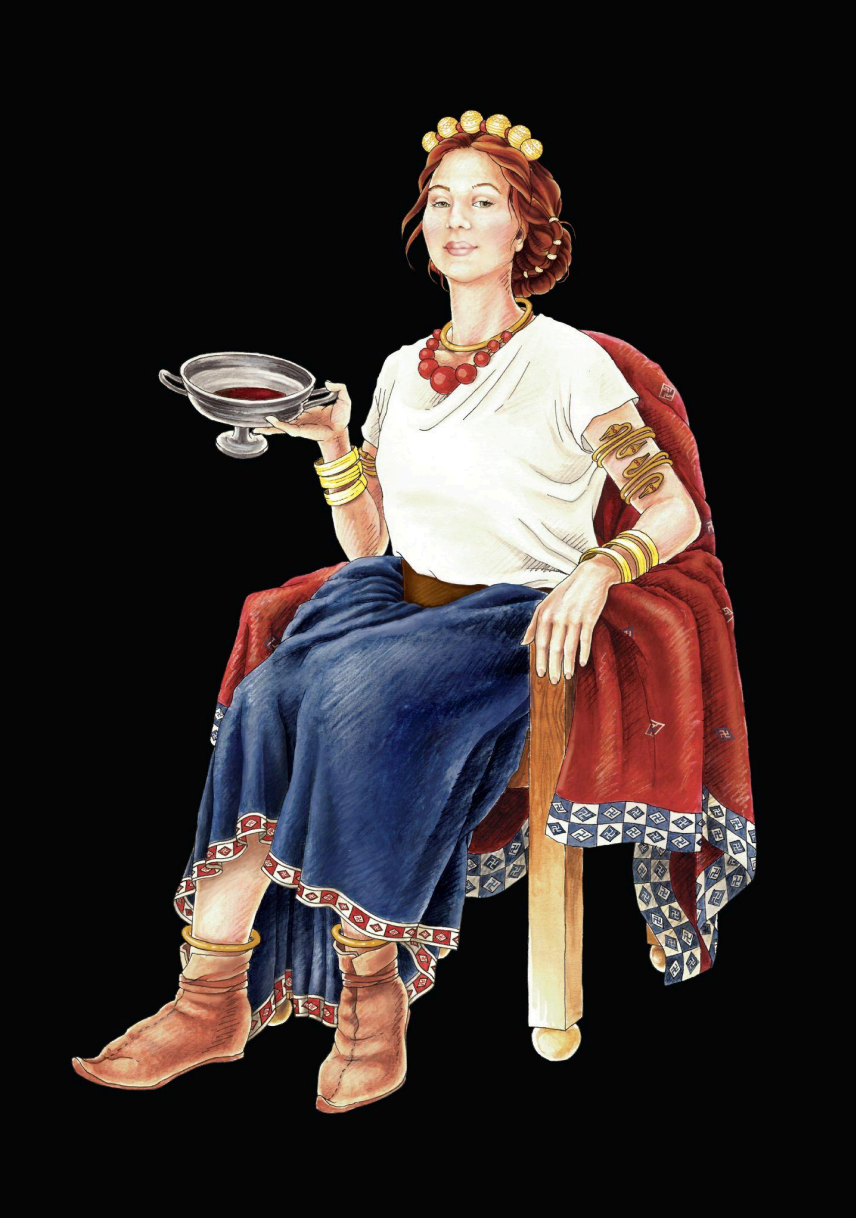
The Lady of Ditzingen-Schöckingen, Germany

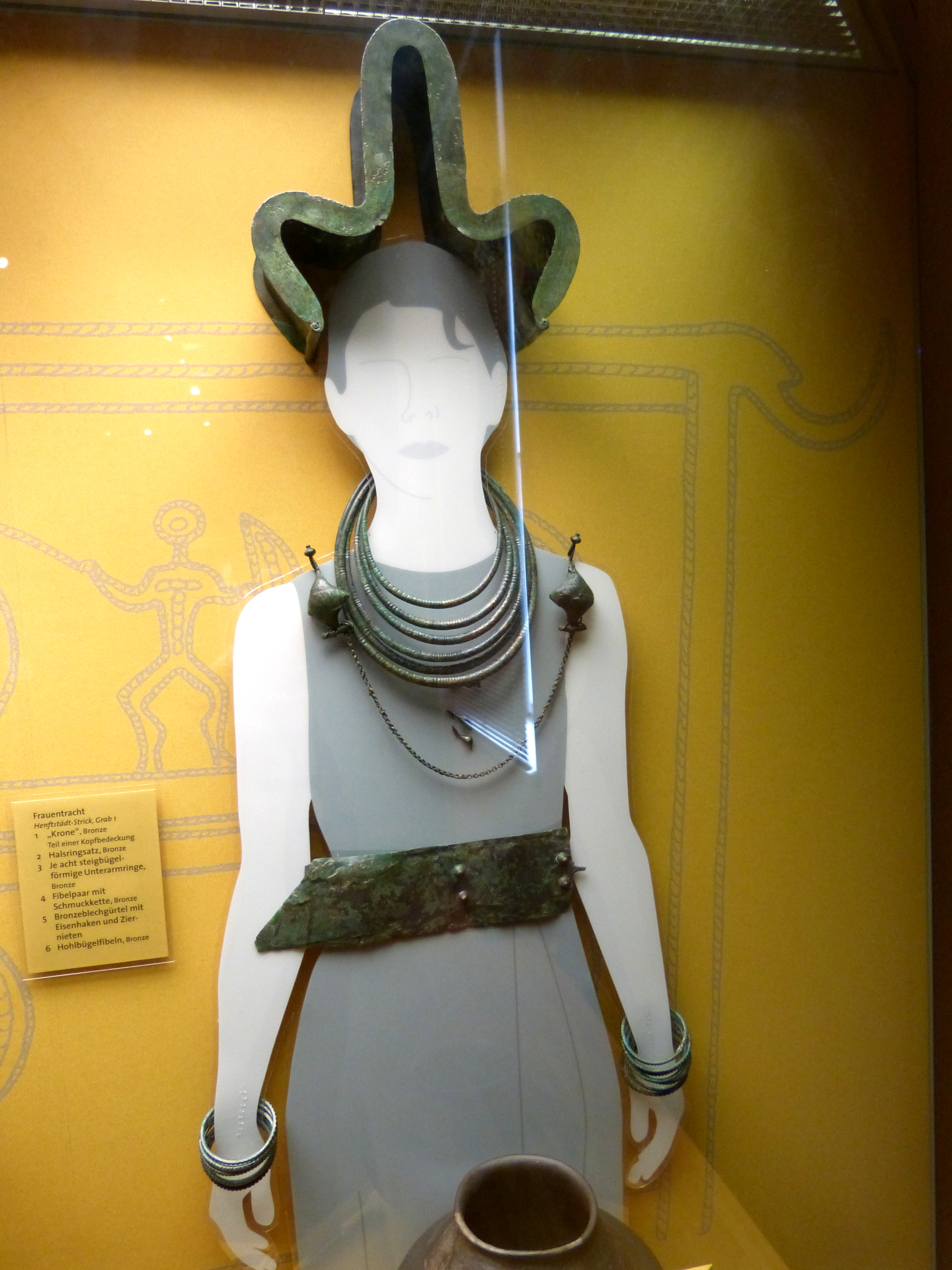
Jewellery and headdress, Germany, 6th century BC

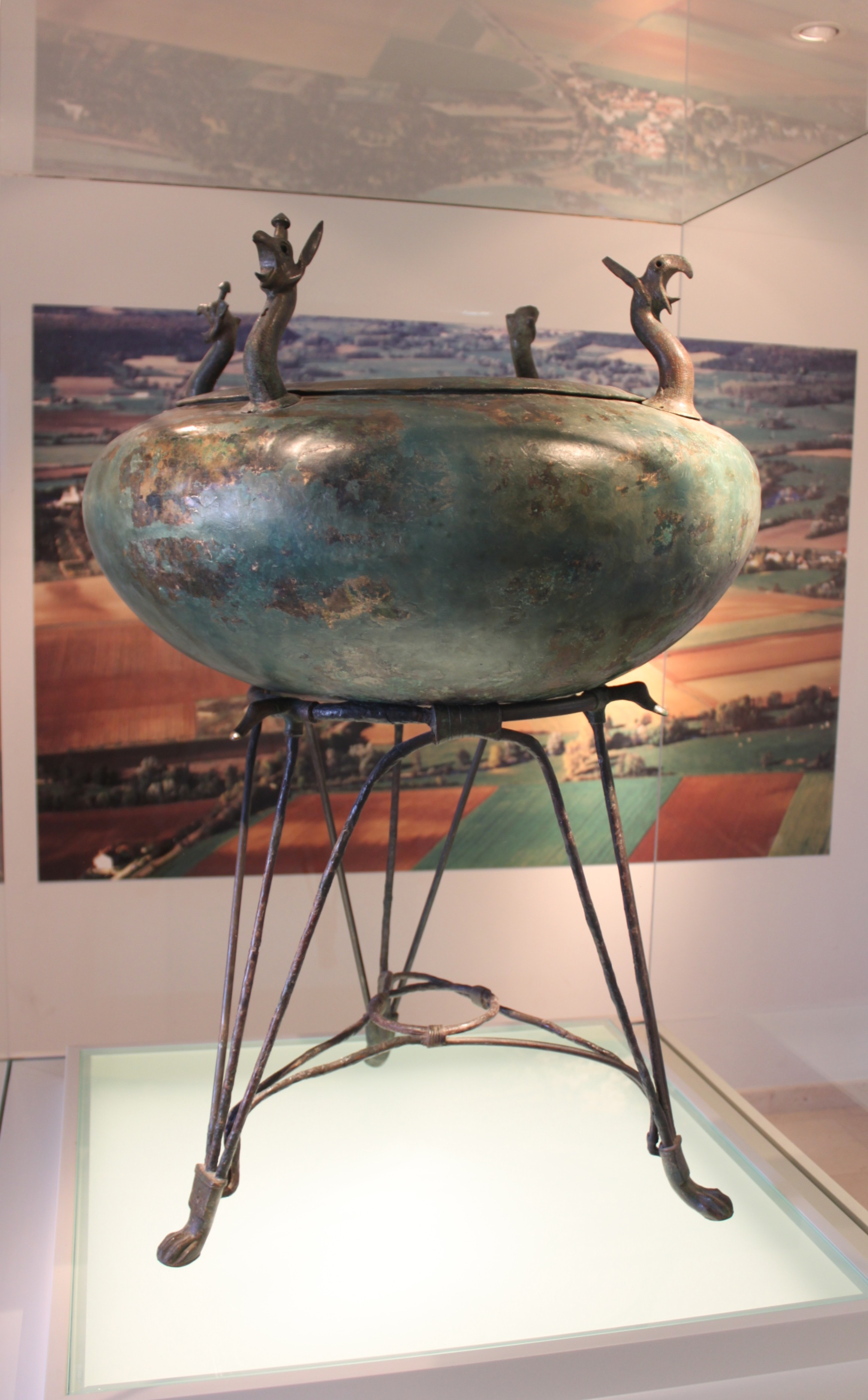
Etruscan lebes from Sainte-Colombe-sur-Seine

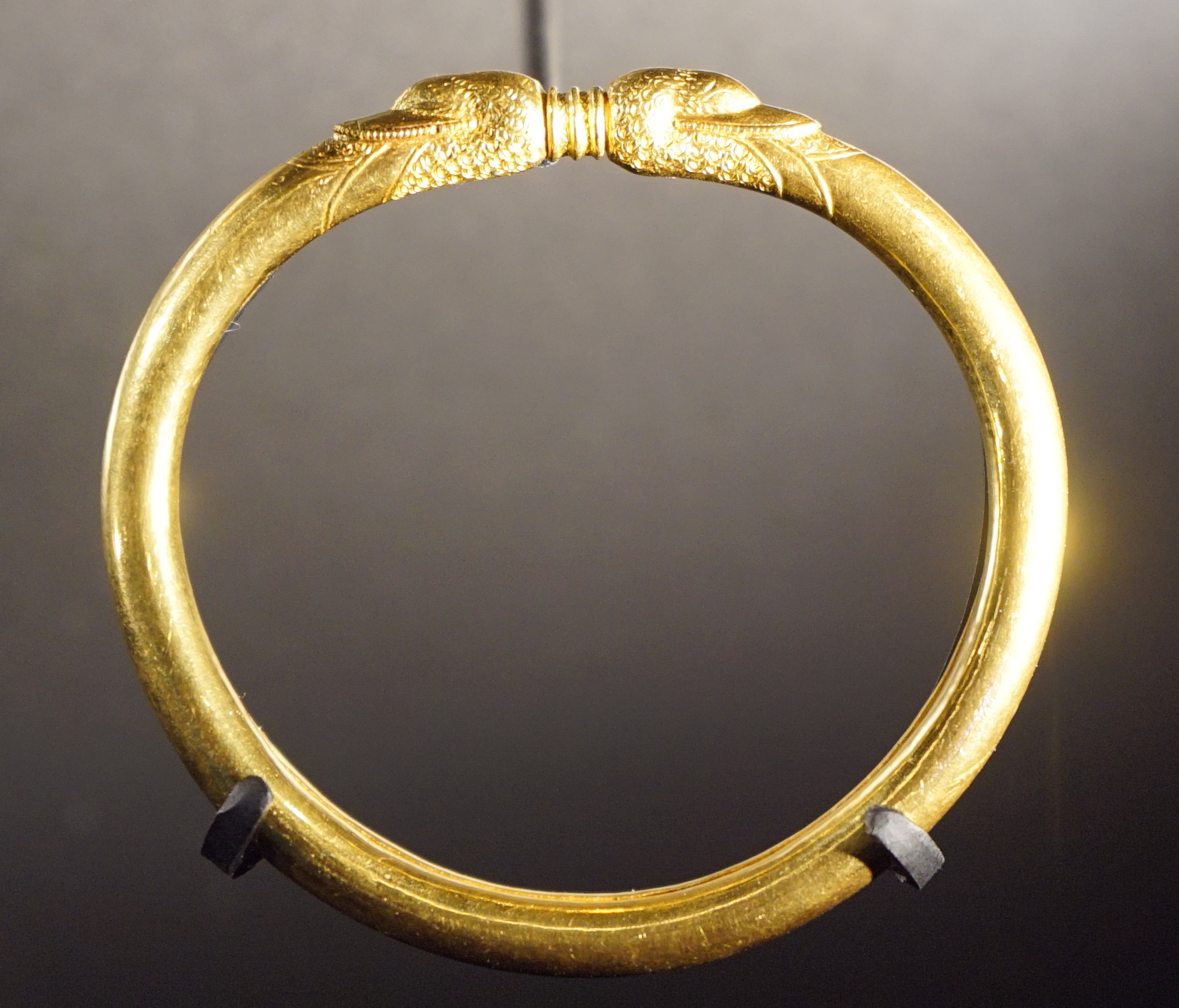
Late Hallstatt gold bracelet from Lavau Grave, France

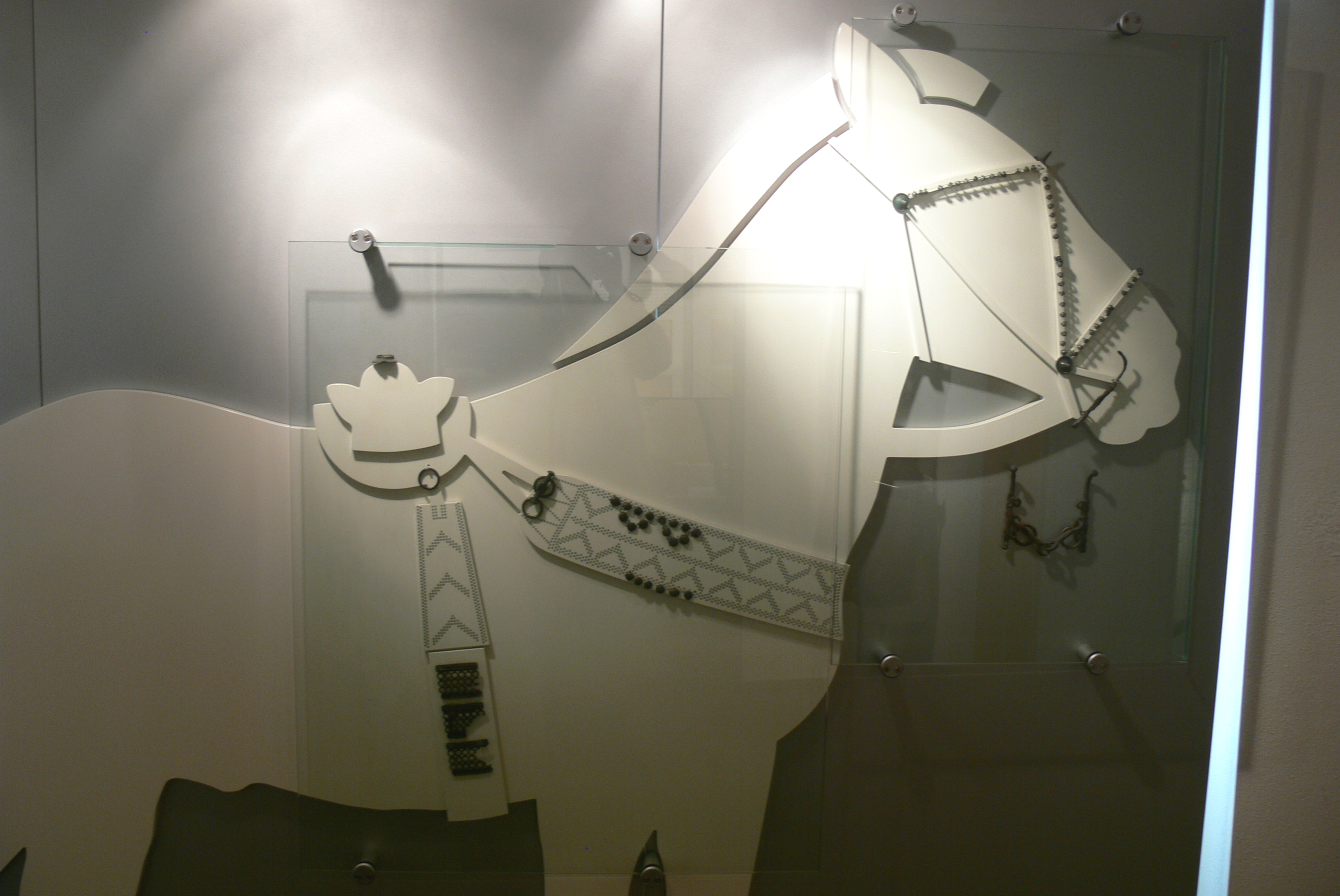
Horse equipment from Alfershausen, Germany

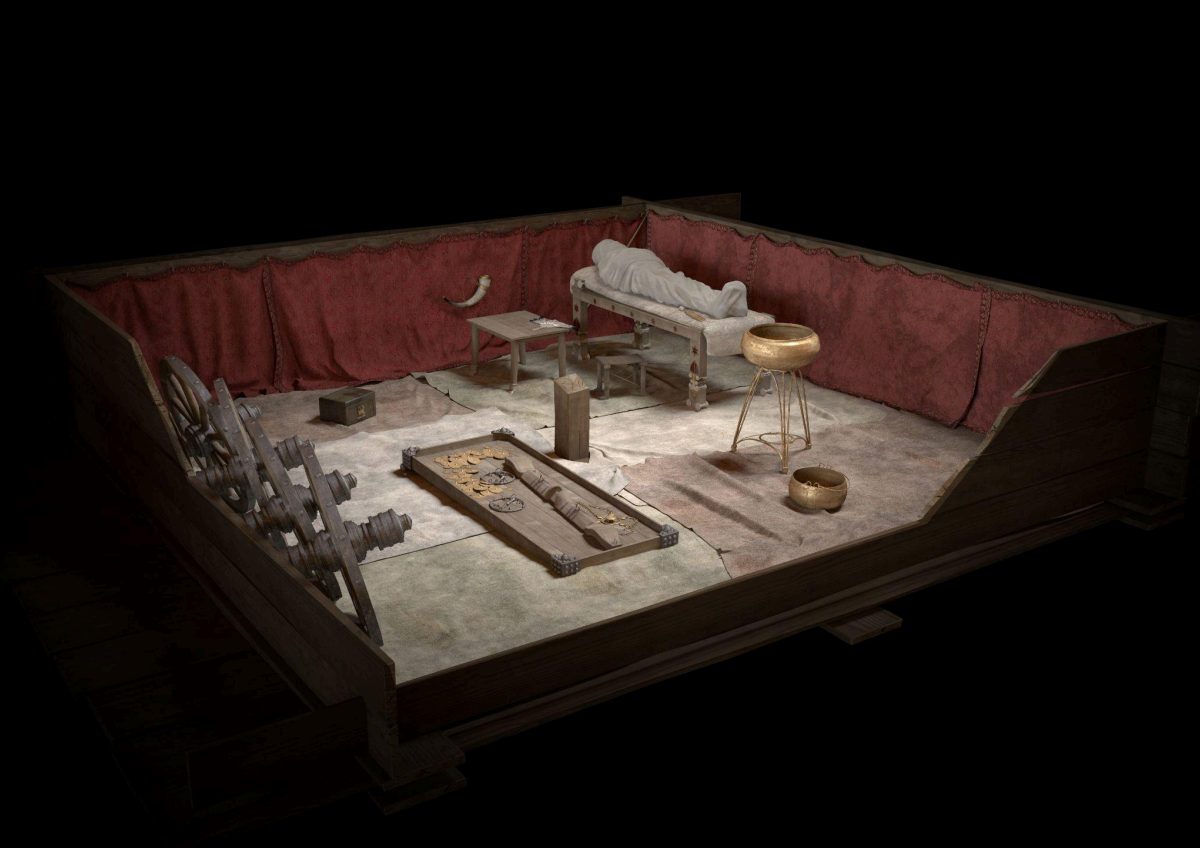
The Grafenbühl grave, Hohenasperg, Germany

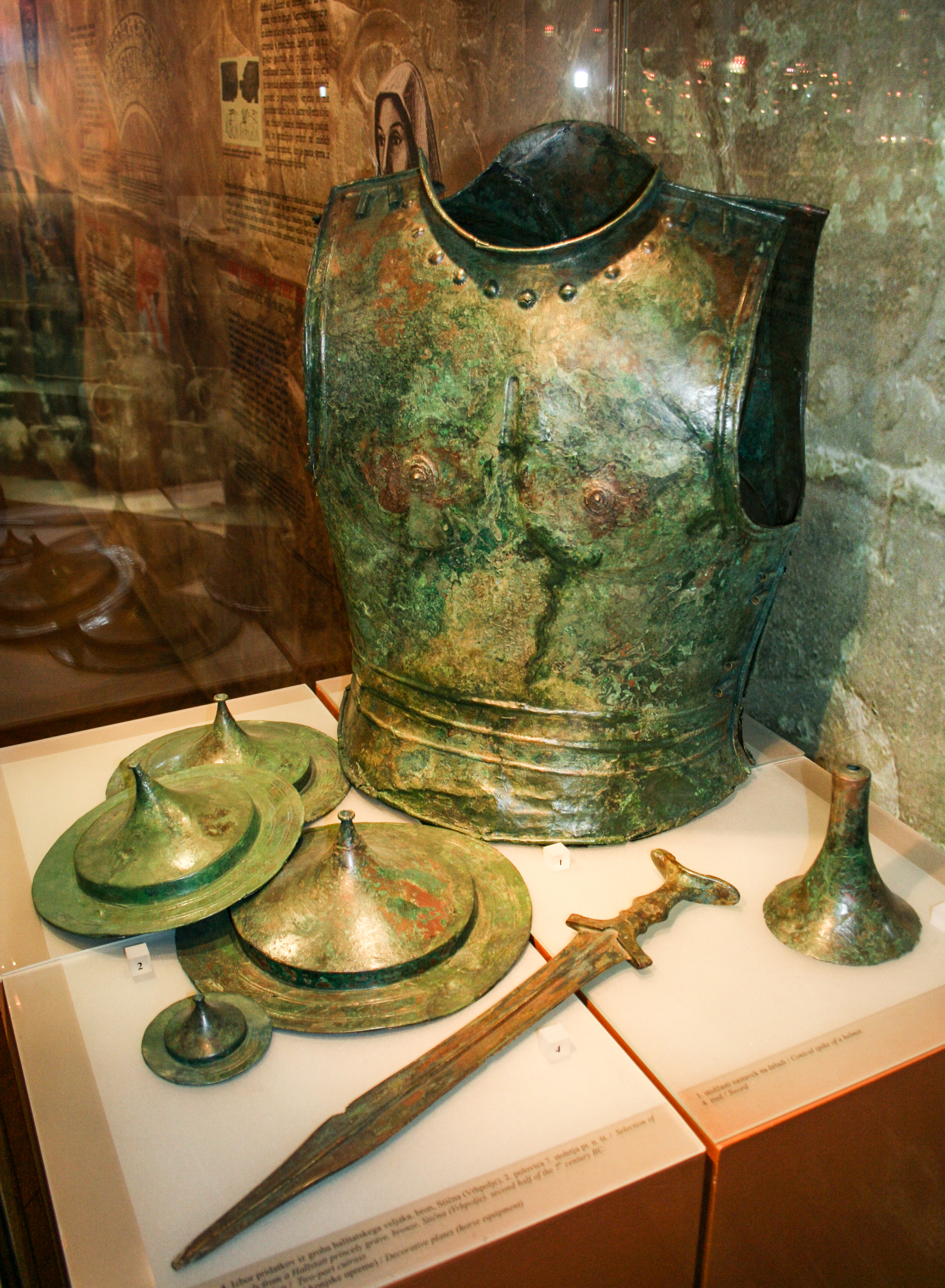
Warrior equipment from Slovenia, c.600 BC

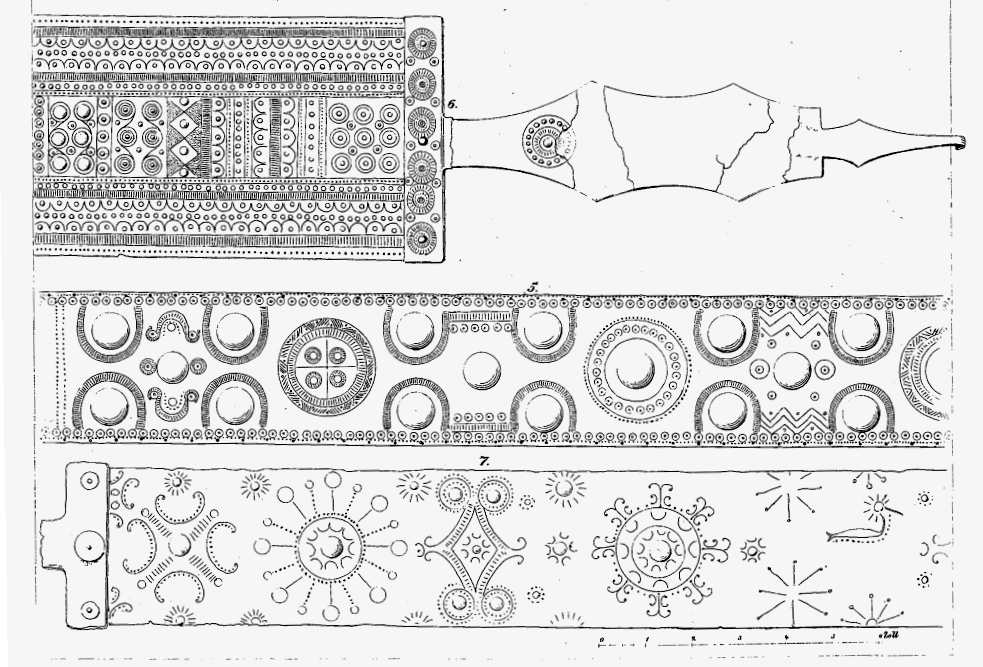
Belt-plate decorations from Hallstatt

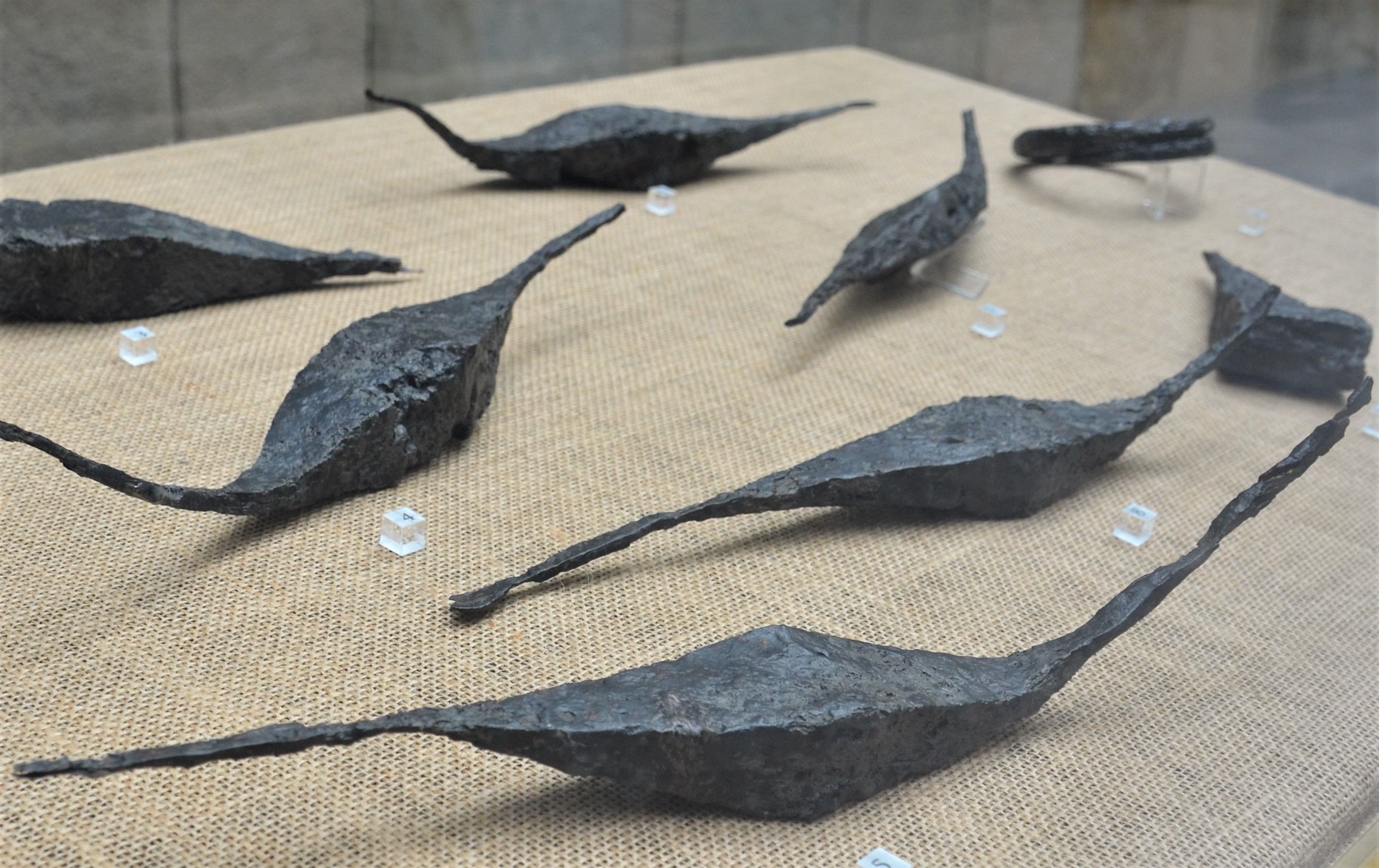
Bipyramidal iron bars used as ingots

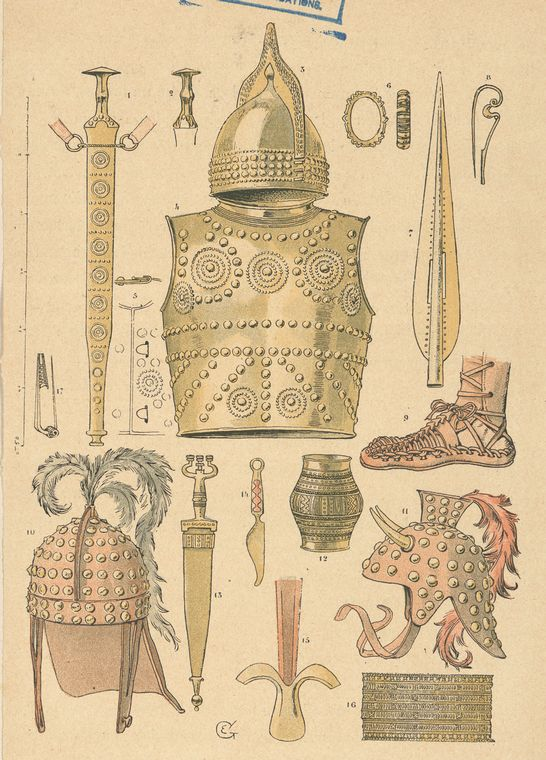
Hallstatt culture artefacts

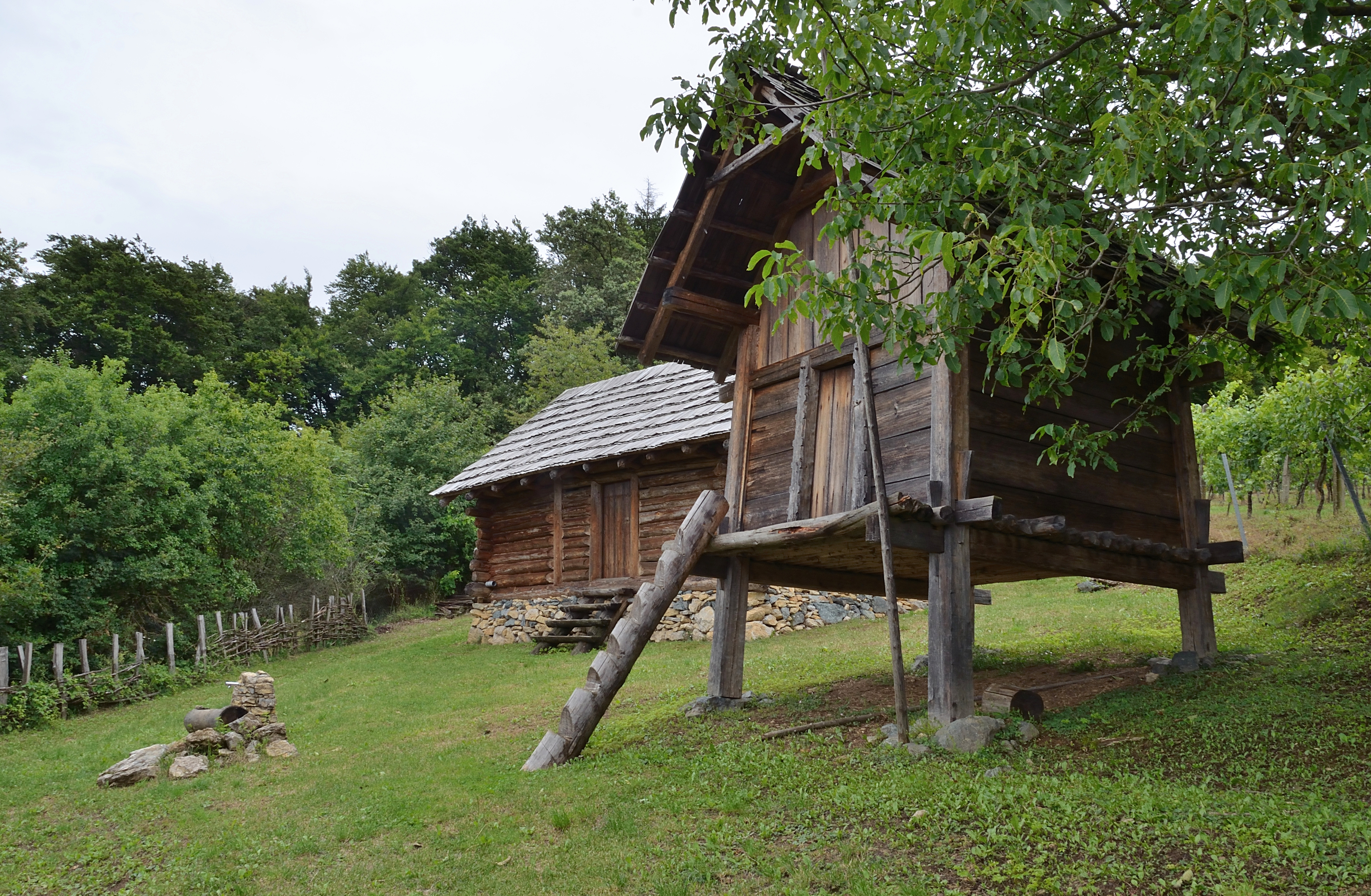
Reconstruction of a house (left) and granary (right) at Burgstallkogel, Austria

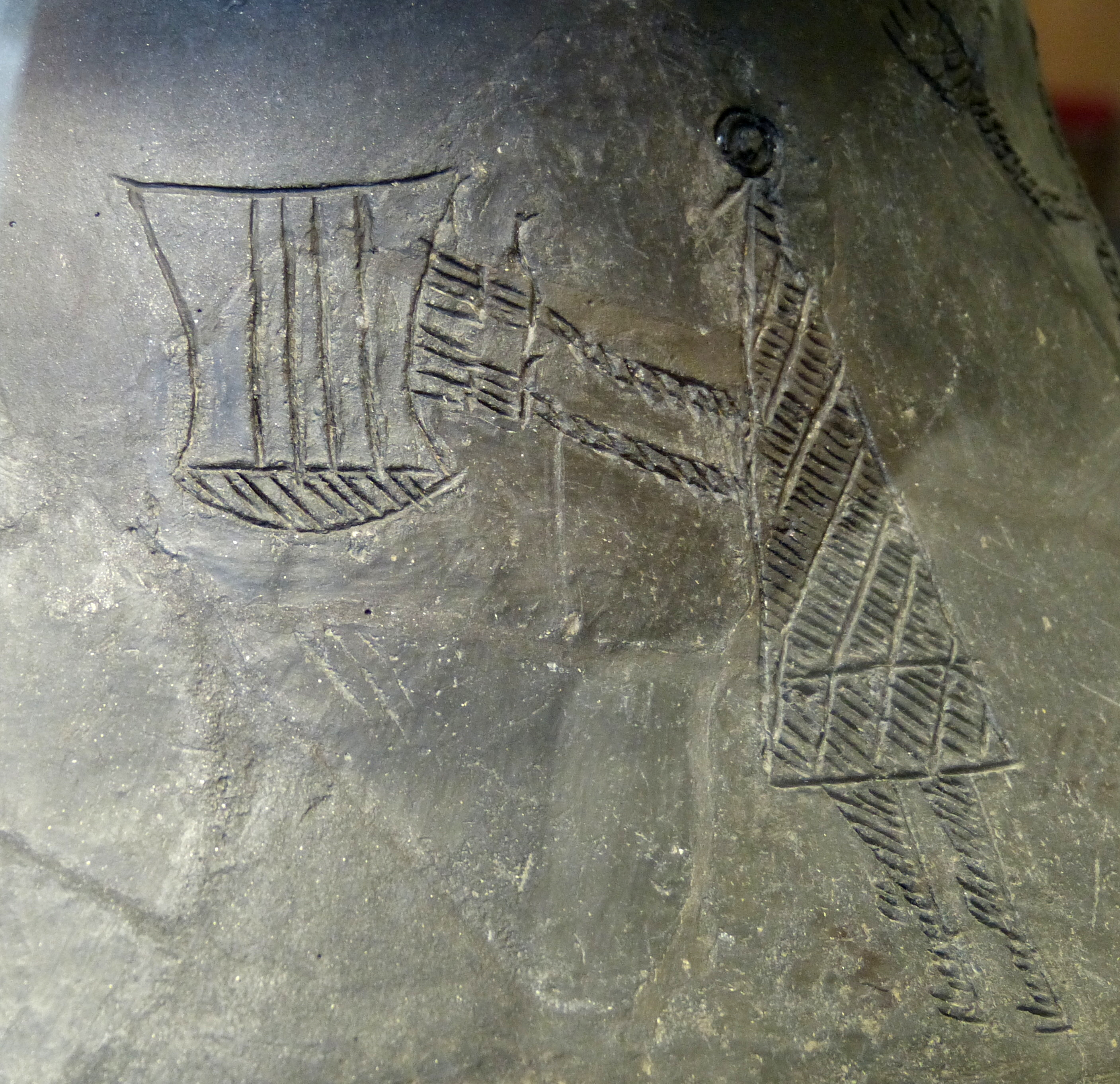
Depiction on pottery of a lyre-player, Hungary, c. 700 BC

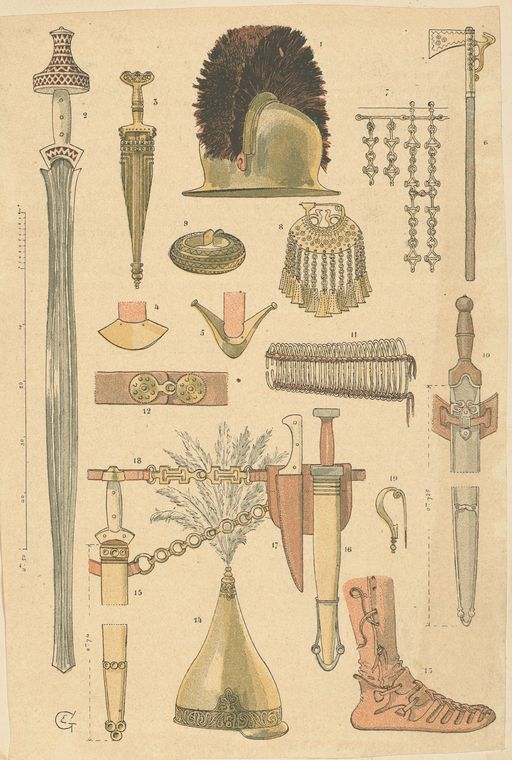
Hallstatt culture artefacts

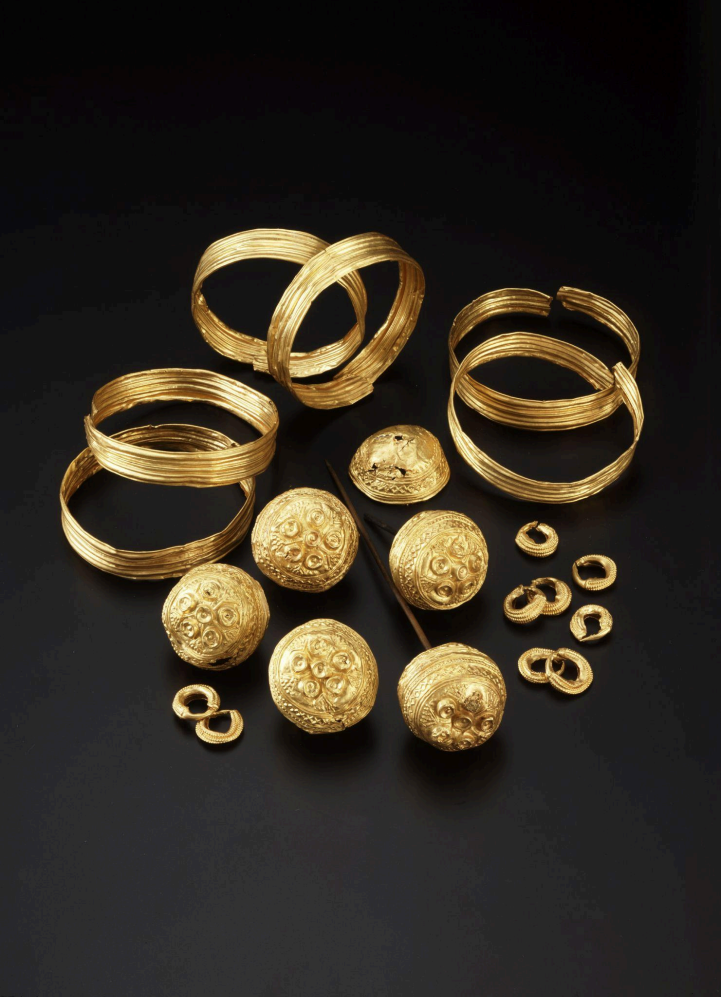
Gold jewllery from Schöckingen, Germany

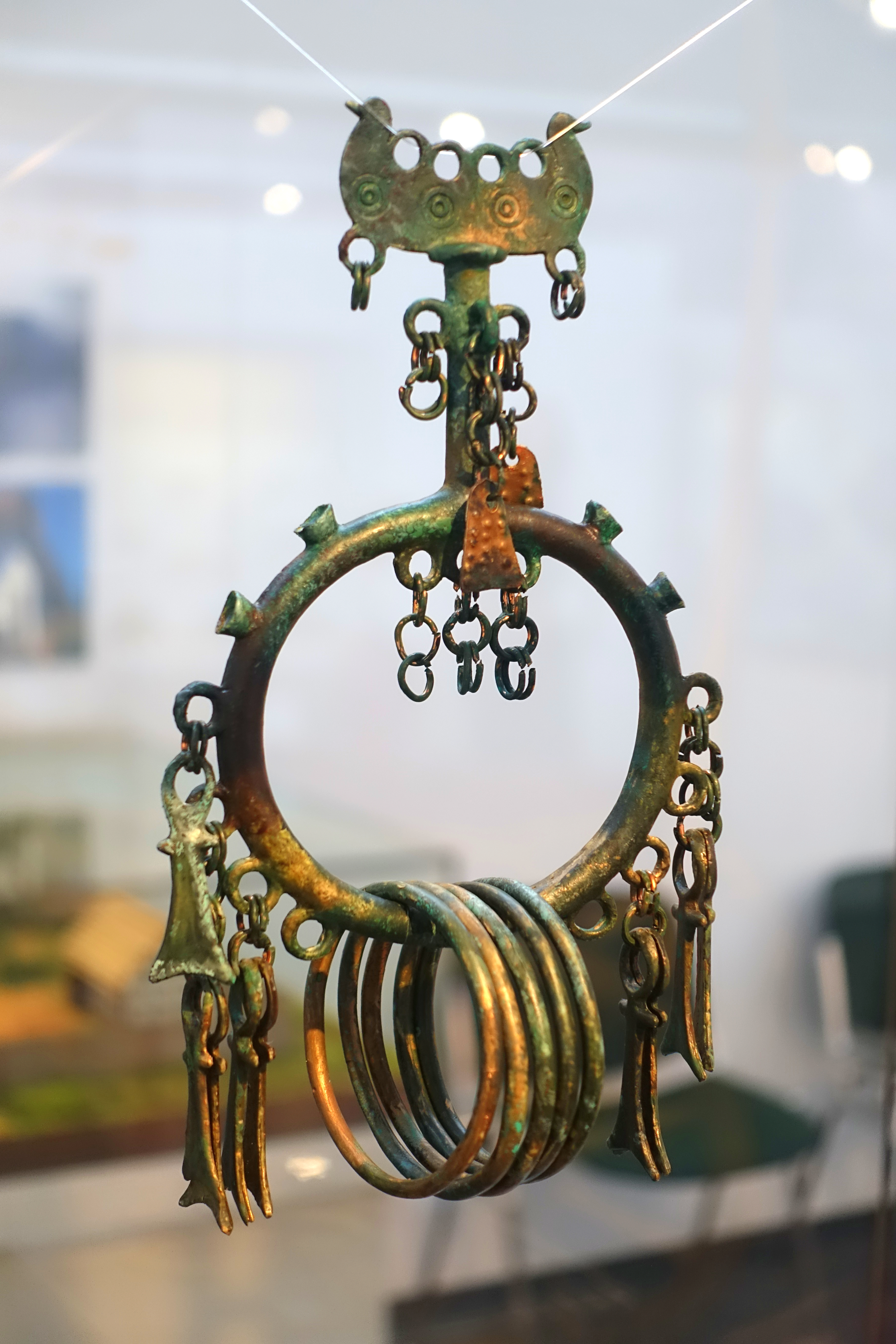
Bronze ornament, Germany

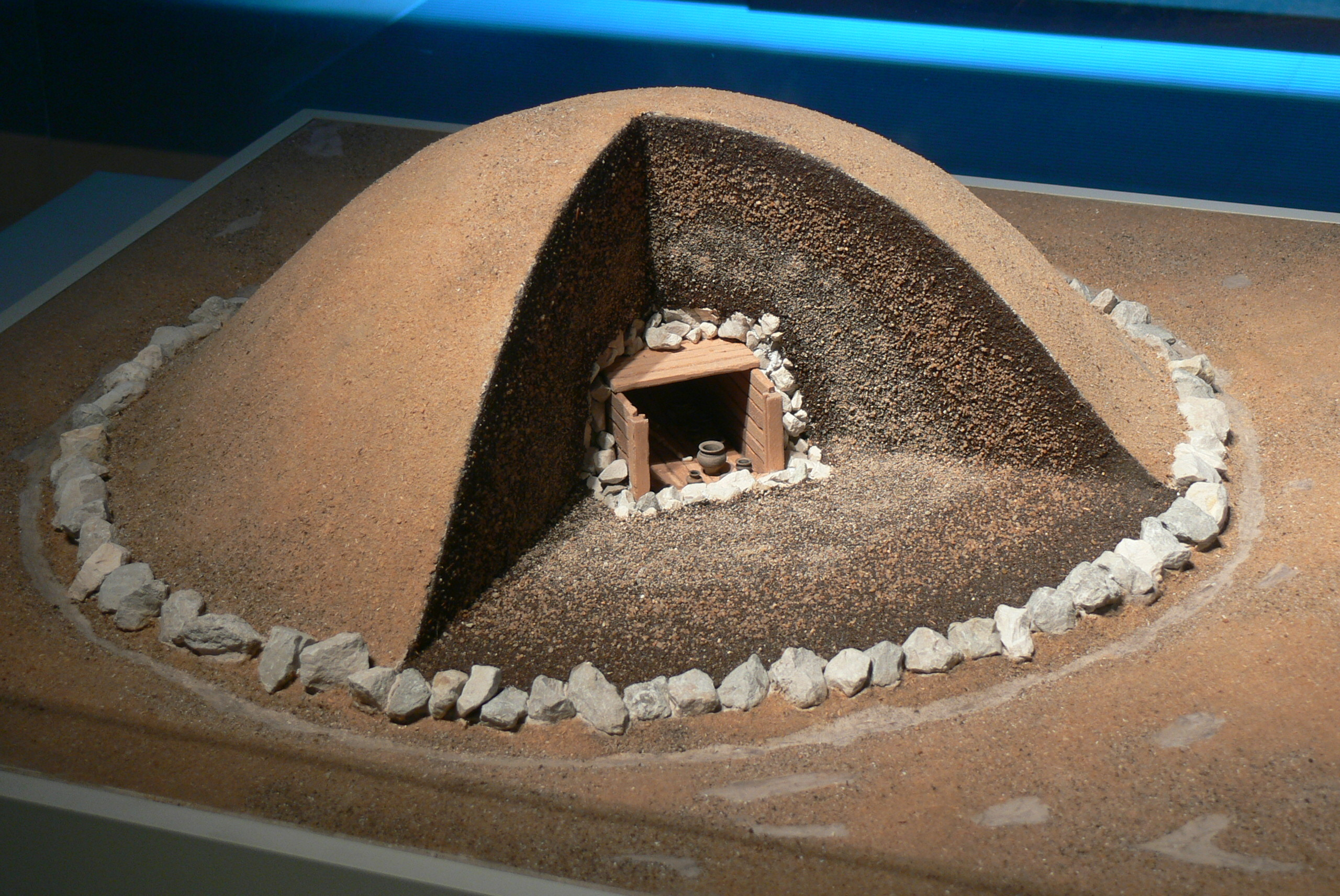
Model of a Hallstatt barrow grave, Germanisches Nationalmuseum

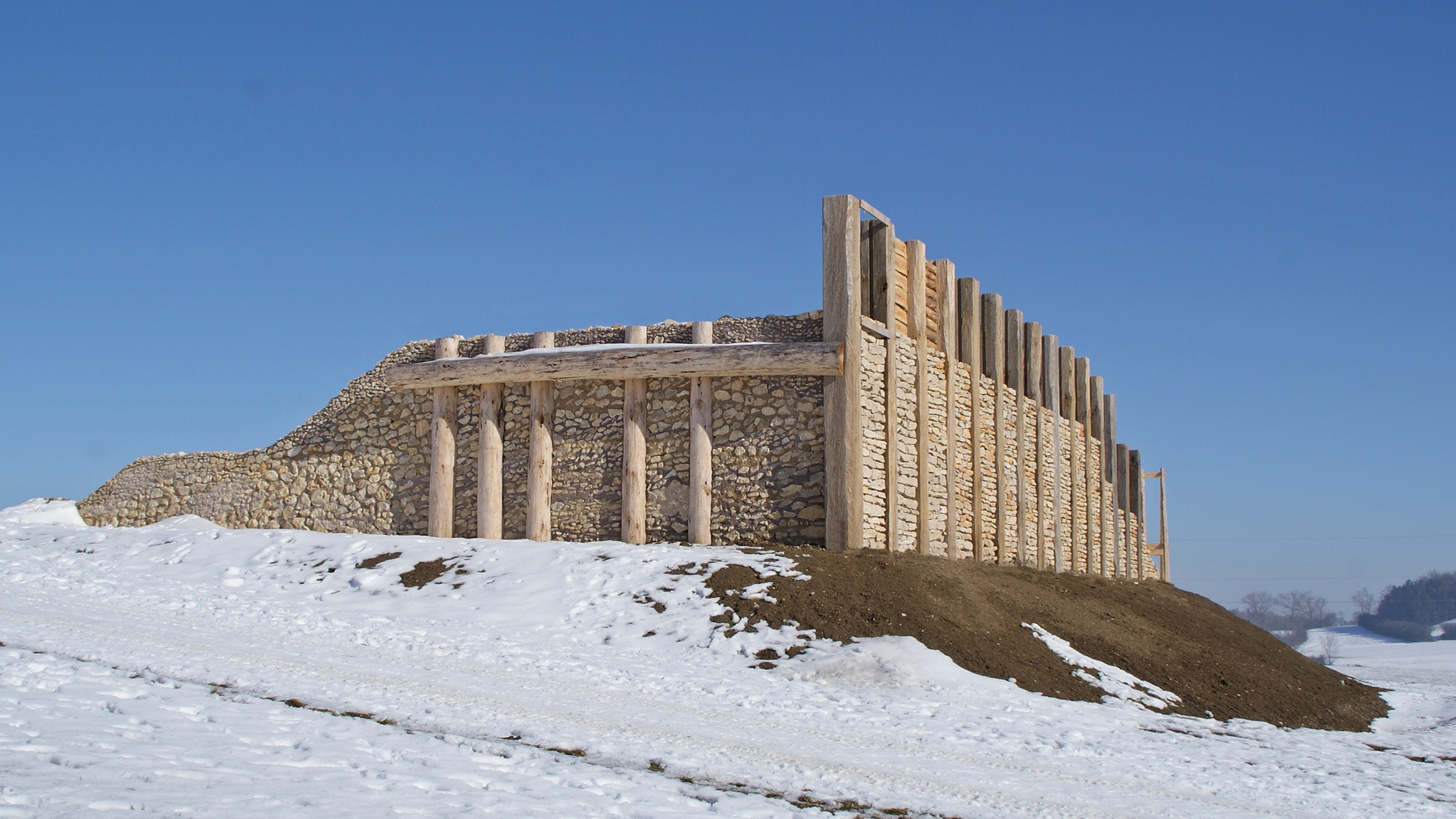
Reconstructed pfostenschlizmauer fortification at the Ipf hillfort

== Genetics ==
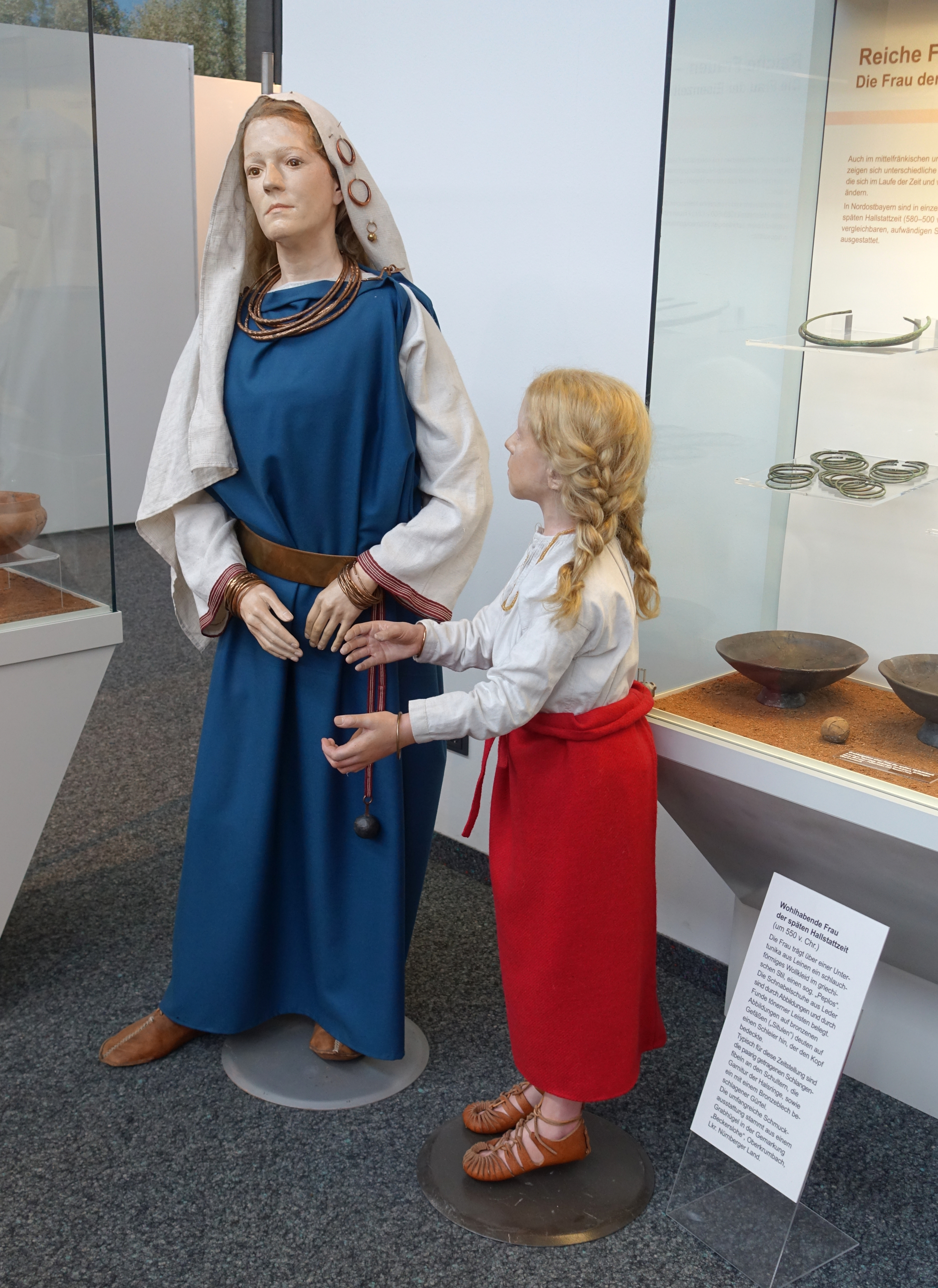
Hallstatt culture dress, reconstruction

Damgaard et al. (2018) analyzed the remains of a male and female buried at a Hallstatt cemetery near Litoměřice, Czech Republic between ca. 600 BC and 400 BC. The male carried paternal haplogroup R1b and the maternal haplogroup H6a1a. The female was a carrier of the maternal haplogroup HV0. Damgaard further examined the remains of 5 individuals ascribed to either Hallstatt C or the early La Tène culture. The one male carried Y-haplogroup G2a. The five females carried mt-haplogroups K1a2a, J1c2o, H7d, U5a1a1 and J1c-16261. The examined individuals of the Hallstatt culture and La Tène culture displayed genetic continuity with the earlier Bell Beaker culture, and carried about 50% steppe-related ancestry.

The next study, Fischer et al. (2022), examined 49 genomes from 27 sites in Bronze Age and Iron Age France. The study found of strong genetic continuity between the two periods, particularly in southern France. The samples from northern and southern France were highly homogenous. The northern French samples were distinguished from the southern ones by elevated levels of steppe-related ancestry. R1b was by far the most dominant paternal lineage, while H was the most common maternal lineage. They displayed links to contemporary samples from Great Britain and Sweden. Southern samples displaying links to Celtiberians. The Iron Age samples resembled those of modern-day populations of France, Great Britain and Spain. The evidence suggested that the Celts of the Hallstatt culture largely evolved from local Bronze Age populations.

Gretzinger et al. (2024) examined 31 individuals in the context of Hallstatt culture in southern Germany, dating between 616 and 200 BC, and found that the Hallstatt Y-chromosome gene pool is dominated by R1b-M269 and G2a-P303 lineages, with subhaplogroup G2a-L497 accounting for 37% of the haplotypes in the sample.

== See also ==
- Glauberg
- Hohenasperg
- Ipf (mountain)
- Mont Lassois (commune of Vix)
- Burgstallkogel
- Alte Burg
- Vorstengraf (Oss)
- Grafenbühl grave
- Bronze and Iron Age Poland
- Celtic warfare
- Iron Age sword
- Iron Age France
- Iron Age Switzerland
- Noric steel
- Irschen
- Zollfeld
- The Collection of Pre- and Protohistoric Artifacts at the University of Jena
- Archaeology of Northern Europe

== Documentary ==
- Klaus T. Steindl: MYTHOS HALLSTATT - Dawn of the Celts. TV-Documentary featuring new findings and reporting on the state of archaeological research on the Celts (2018)

== Sources ==
- Barth, F.E., J. Biel, et al. Vierrädrige Wagen der Hallstattzeit ("The Hallstatt four-wheeled wagons" at Mainz). Mainz: Römisch-Germanisches Zentralmuseum; 1987. ISBN 3-88467-016-6
- Brunel, Samantha; et al. (June 9, 2020). "Ancient genomes from present-day France unveil 7,000 years of its demographic history". Proceedings of the National Academy of Sciences of the United States of America. 117 (23). National Academy of Sciences: 12791–12798. Bibcode:2020PNAS..11712791B. doi:10.1073/pnas.1918034117. PMC 7293694. PMID 32457149.
- Damgaard, P. B.; et al. (May 9, 2018). "137 ancient human genomes from across the Eurasian steppes". Nature. 557 (7705): 369–373. Bibcode:2018Natur.557..369D. doi:10.1038/s41586-018-0094-2. hdl:1887/3202709. PMID 29743675. S2CID 13670282.
- Fischer, Claire-Elise; et al. (2022). "Origin and mobility of Iron Age Gaulish groups in present-day France revealed through archaeogenomics". iScience. 25 (4) 104094. Cell Press. Bibcode:2022iSci...25j4094F. doi:10.1016/j.isci.2022.104094. PMC 8983337. PMID 35402880.
- Leskovar, Jutta (2006). "Hallstat [2] the Hallstat culture". In Koch, John T (ed.). Celtic Culture: A Historical Encyclopedia. ABC-CLIO. ISBN 1-85109-440-7.
- Laing, Lloyd and Jenifer. Art of the Celts, Thames and Hudson, London 1992 ISBN 0-500-20256-7
- McIntosh, Jane, Handbook to Life in Prehistoric Europe, 2009, Oxford University Press (USA), ISBN 9780195384765
- Megaw, Ruth and Vincent, Celtic Art, 2001, Thames and Hudson, ISBN 0-500-28265-X
- Sandars, Nancy K., Prehistoric Art in Europe, Penguin (Pelican, now Yale, History of Art), 1968 (nb 1st edn.)
