= Pyrene (disambiguation) =

Pyrene is a chemical compound.

Pyrene may also refer to:

- The Pyrene Company Limited, a manufacturer of firefighting equipment
  - Brand name for Carbon tetrachloride used in Pyrene extinguishers
- Pyrene (mythology), consort of Ares and the mother of Cycnus in Greek mythology
- Pyrene (gastropod), a genus of sea snails from the family Columbellidae
- Pyrena, the pit or stone inside some fruits
- Pyrenees, a mountain range between France and Spain
- Pyrene, a Celtic city near the sources of the Danube mentioned by Herodotus: see Heuneburg

== See also ==
- Pirene (disambiguation)
- Pyrenoid, a stone-like structure within the chloroplast of hornworts and some algae
