= Pirene =

Pirene may refer to:

- Pirene (fountain), in Corinth
- Pirene (mythology), a nymph in Greek mythology
- Pirene, one of the daughters of Danaus

== See also ==
- Pyrene, a chemical compound
