= Heuneburg =

Prehistoric hillfort in southern Germany

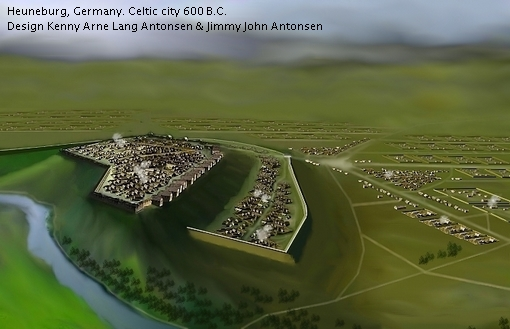
- Reconstructed Celtic Heuneburg in 600 B.C.

- Location in Baden-Württemberg Location in Germany
- 48°05′41″N 09°24′43″E
- Type: Hillfort, burial mounds
- Periods: Iron Age
- Cultures: Celts, Hallstatt culture, La Tène culture
- Location: Near Herbertingen, Baden-Württemberg
- Region: Germany

History
- Built: Main structure 7th century BC
- Built by: Celts
- Abandoned: 5th century BC

Site notes
- Material: Wood, earth
- Public access: Yes

The Heuneburg is a prehistoric Celtic hillfort by the river Danube in Hundersingen near Herbertingen, between Ulm and Sigmaringen, Baden-Württemberg, in the south of Germany, close to the modern borders with Switzerland and Austria. It is considered to be one of the most important early Celtic centres in Central Europe, particularly during the Iron Age Hallstatt culture period. Apart from the fortified citadel, there are extensive remains of settlements and burial areas spanning several centuries.

The fortified citadel measures about 300 by 150 m (980 by 490 ft). It stood on a strategically positioned mountain spur that rises steeply 40 m (130 ft) above the Danube. It is at the centre of a fertile river plain, surrounded by rolling hill country. During the Iron Age the Heuneburg is thought to have controlled a surrounding area of over 1,000 km^{2} (390 sq mi) including other hilltop settlements, hamlets, villages, roads, cemeteries and cult or gathering places.

The settlement has been called "oldest city north of the alps", and has been identified with the Celtic city of Pyrene mentioned by Herodotus.

..."The Istros river arises among the Celts and the polis of Pyrene, cutting Europe across the middle" — Herodotus (c.484–c.425 BC). (Note: Extract from Histories — Herodotus (c.484–c.425 BC).)

== Discovery and excavations ==
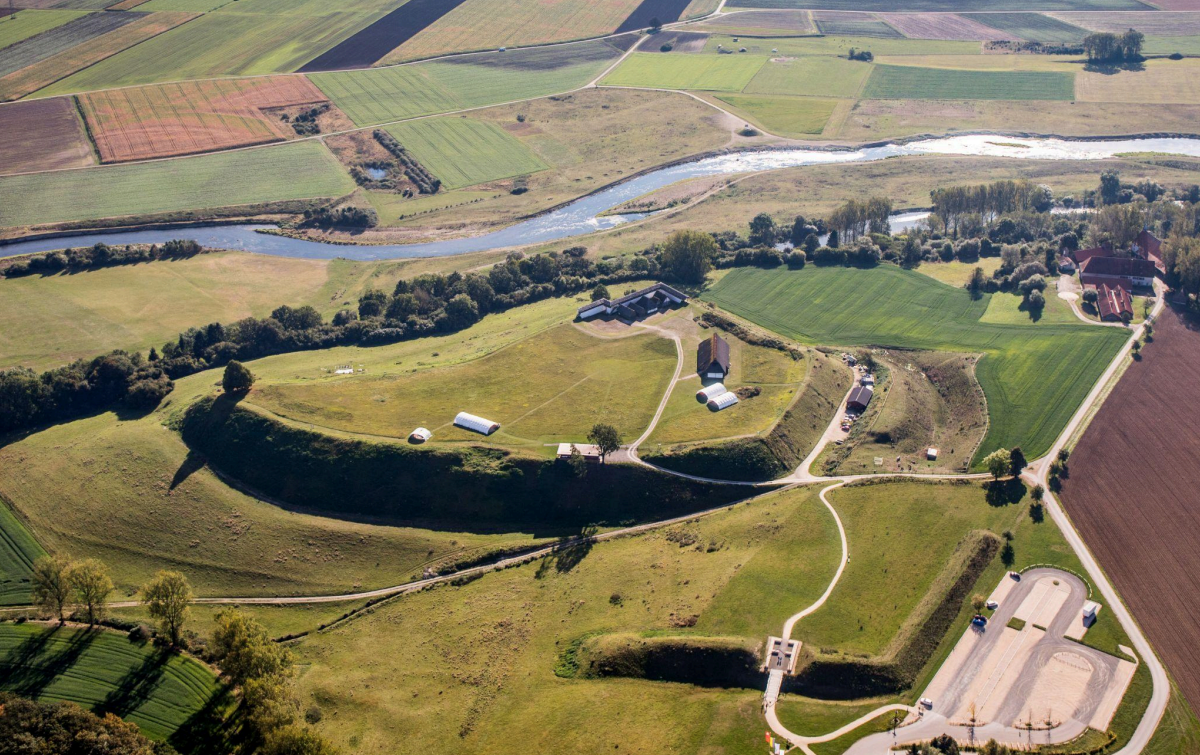
Aerial view of the Heuneburg on the Danube with today's open-air museum

The site was first noted in the 1820s. In 1882, Eduard Paulus recognised its importance and correctly identified it as a prehistoric fortification. He misidentified the lower fortifications as medieval. Some of the nearby burial mounds were opened in the 19th century.

Sporadic excavation on the citadel began in the 1920s. In the 1930s, the Hohmichele mound was examined (see below). A systematic excavation programme took place from 1950 to 1979, directed successively by Adolf Rieth, Kurt Bittel, Egon Gersbach and Wolfgang Kimmig.

Since 2003, the Heuneburg is one of the foci of a multi-disciplinary research project on early Celtic centres undertaken by the Deutsche Forschungsgemeinschaft. New excavations began in 2004.

== History ==
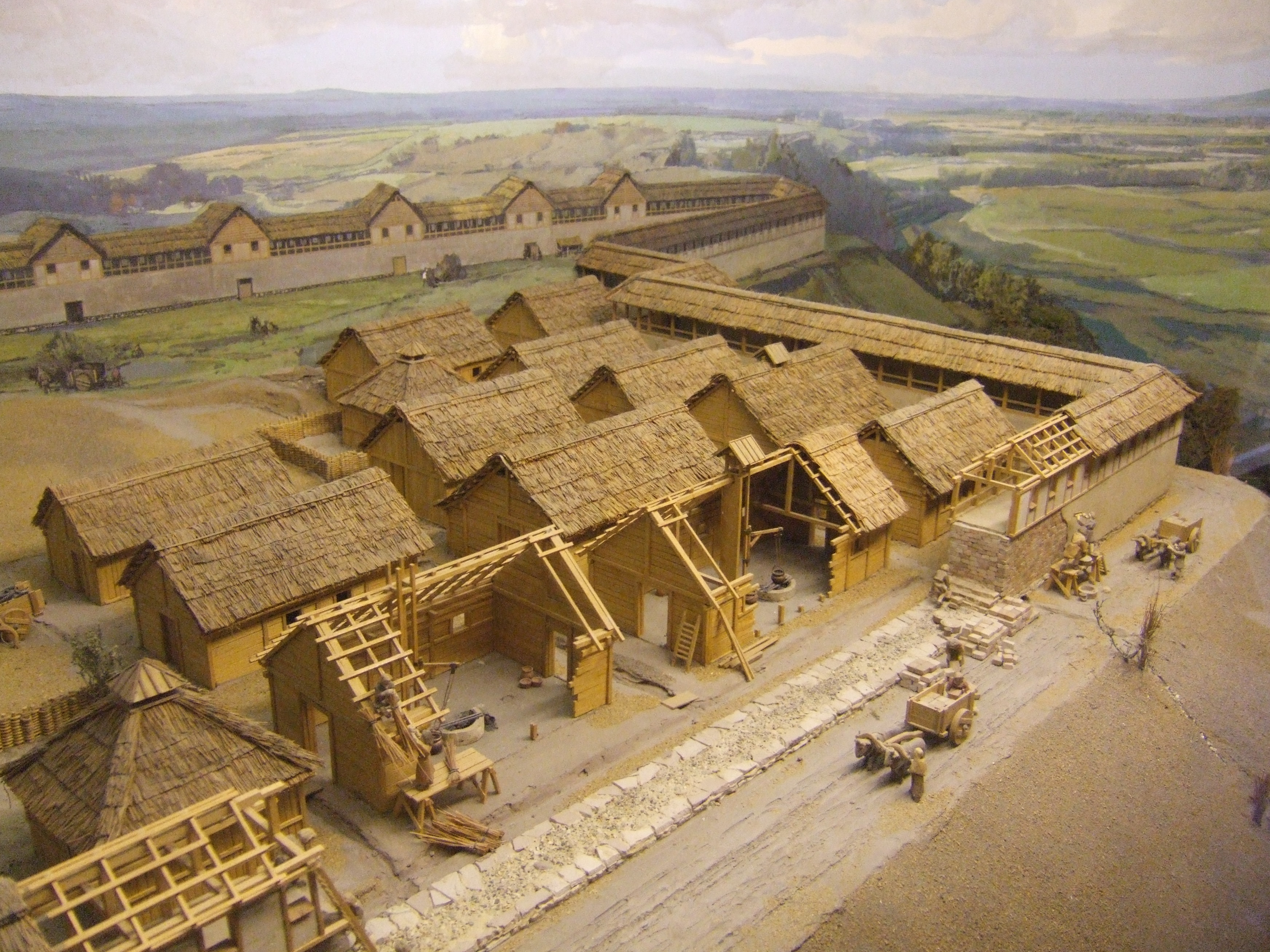
Model of the Heuneburg, Hallstatt period. Heuneburg Museum

Although best known for its role as an important early Celtic centre from the 7th to 5th centuries BC, the Heuneburg was occupied at several other points during its history.

The first settlement on the site dates to the Middle Bronze Age (15th to 12th century BC) during the Tumulus culture period. At this time, the main plateau was fortified with a massive ditch-and-bank enclosure, including a wooden wall. The settlement was abandoned at the beginning of the Urnfield period. This abandonment apparently did not entail a violent destruction. During the Urnfield period, there was a burial area in the location of the later Südsiedlung (see below).

The citadel was reoccupied and refortified around 700 BC; adjacent areas were occupied at the same time, including Alte Burg and Grosse Heuneburg. The Heuneburg complex developed briskly, and by 600 BC, it was one of the key centres of power and trade in Celtic/Halstatt Southern Germany. Major changes in internal structure occurred around that time. Before 500 BC, the site suffered a major destruction, followed by a second flourish and a further destruction in the 5th century BC. It used to be assumed that the Heuneburg was abandoned by the La Tène period, but recent evidence does not fully support this view. The conjunction of a prominent fortified site, elaborate burials, specialised craft production and trade of valuable imported goods class the Heuneburg with a small group of similar important early Celtic sites, the so-called Fürstensitze (see below).

The strategic location of the Heuneburg led to some activity in the Middle Ages, although no permanent occupation occurred at that time.

== The Celtic citadel ==
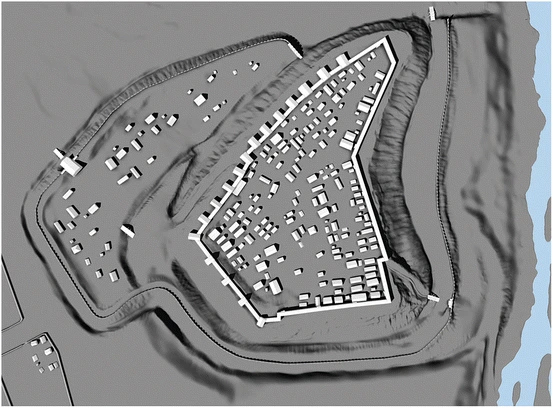
Plan of the citadel, surrounded by the 600 BC mudbrick wall. Internal structures (as far as known) as in c. 550 BC

The main two-hectare (4.9-acre) plateau on the mountain spur, 40m above the Danube and naturally defensible, was the centre of high-status occupation and of fortification in Celtic periods. It measures only 150 by 300 m (490 by 980 ft) but is the main visual landmark in the area. From c. 700 BC onwards, it was the centre of a large settlement.

The main settlement on the citadel underwent several changes during its existence. As the houses were built of wood and daub, and the fortifications mostly of wood and earth, they were replaced frequently. This resulted in over a dozen identifiable occupation phases, representing at least 250 years of activity.

The plateau was refortified from c. 700 BC onwards. Originally, the fortification took the form of a classic Celtic wood-and-earth wall (murus gallicus), replaced regularly.

Around 600 BC, this was replaced by a structure without parallel in contemporary Celtic Europe. A limestone foundation supported a sun-dried mudbrick wall of c. 4 m (13 ft) height, probably topped by a roofed walkway, thus reaching a total height of 6 m. The wall was clad with bright white lime plaster, regularly renewed; this was necessary to prevent the northern weather from eroding the unbaked mudbrick. Towers protruded outwards from the wall at intervals. It must have been widely visible in the area, as the modern reconstruction of a section is. No other mudbrick structures are known from Celtic Central Europe at this time. It is generally accepted that this structure imitated contemporary walls in the Mediterranean region.

The wall lasted c. 70 years (much longer than its wood-and-earth predecessors and successors which had to be renewed frequently). After a fiery destruction around 530 BC, the settlement was defended by a murus gallicus again until a further destruction in the 5th century.

The fortification had two monumental gates, one to the west, giving access to the outer settlements, and another to the east, probably to a steep road leading directly to the Danube (and perhaps a harbour).

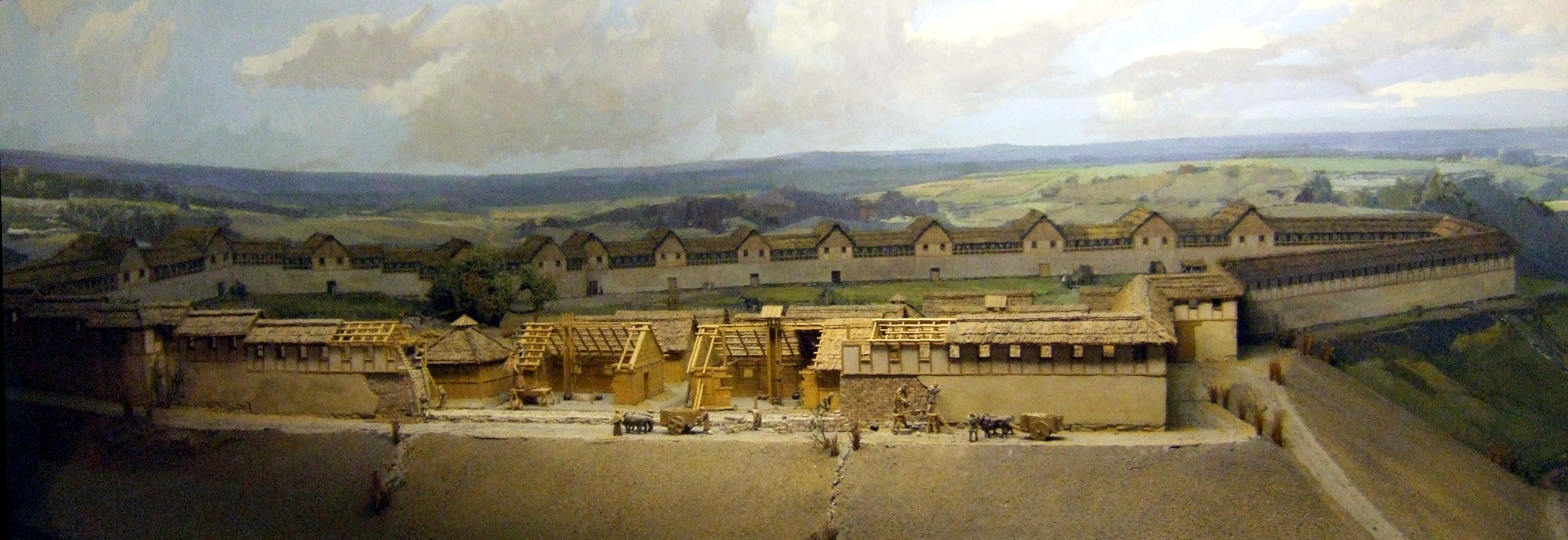
Diorama showing the construction of the Heuneburg

The citadel contained a regular system of streets and houses. It appears that the settlement underwent a major reorganisation after 600 BC, after which the dwellings were much more densely and regularly spaced than before. At all times, the Heuneburg houses are of remarkably large size and elaboration compared to contemporary settlements. The uniform buildings probably served as dwellings and workshops. There is evidence for an active metal industry, including a bronze workshop in the southeast corner of the citadel. After the 530 BC destruction of the mudbrick wall, the internal arrangements underwent some changes. The workshops were moved to the north. A very large house (14 by 30 m [46 by 98 ft]) was built in the southeast corner. This is sometimes interpreted as a Herrenhaus, i.e. the dwelling of a local ruler.

The Heuneburg yielded many finds marking it as a rich site, operating both as a local centre of production and as a hub for long-distance trade. These included a full bronze workshop, a high proportion of Greek vases (in fact, the fragments make up about a dozen Greek pots, indicating a larger amount than contemporary sites but also a very limited elite access to such material), and other imported raw materials like tin and amber. Much of the exotic material dates from after 530 BC. There was also a local tradition of producing painted and decorated (incised or stamped) pottery.

== Settlements outside the citadel ==
Recent work in and around the Heuneburg has produced groundbreaking information regarding the full extent of the settlement. It now appears that the citadel was only a small, if focal, part of the overall complex at most times.

=== The Aussensiedlung ===
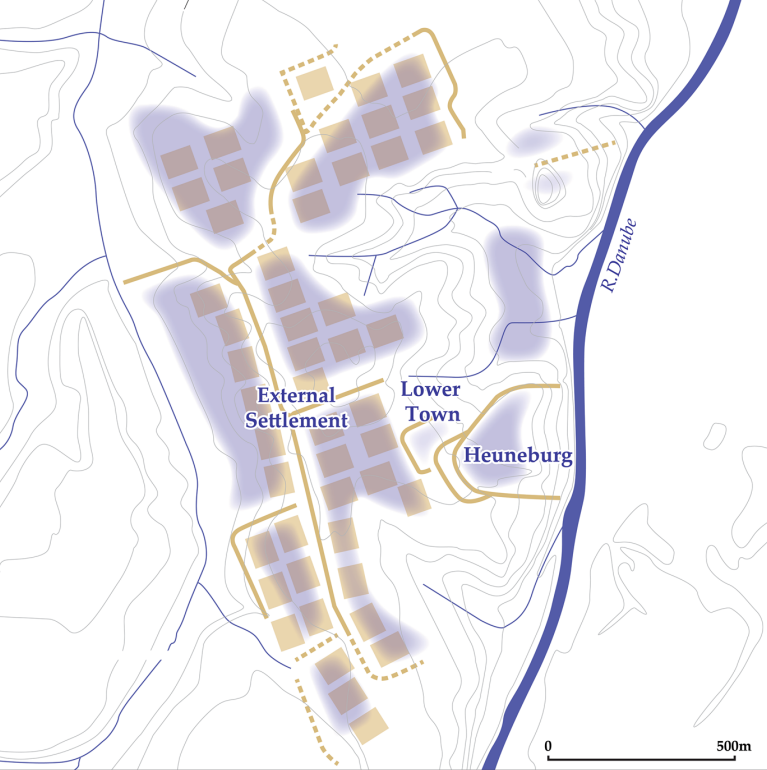
Plan showing the Heuneburg citadel, lower town and exterior settlement

The Aussensiedlung (German: exterior settlement) was located downslope, immediately to the west and northwest of the citadel. It was probably occupied from the 7th century (Hallstatt period) to the 5th century BC. It appears to have existed as a separate fortified settlement. The Aussensiedlung covered up to 100 hectares, many times the area of the citadel proper. It appears to have consisted of separate fenced or palisaded lots, each containing a main dwelling, storage areas and much terrain for fields. It is suggested that each of the lots functioned as a separate farmstead, supporting an extended family. A population of 5,000 to 10,000 individuals is estimated just for the Aussensiedlung. The area enclosed could never have sufficed to produce the amounts of food necessary to feed such a population. The Giessübel mounds (see below) are erected on top of the remains of part of the Aussensiedlung and must thus postdate it.

=== The Südsiedlung ===
The Südsiedlung ("south settlement") further south appears to have been similar to the Aussensiedlung in character and chronology and may indeed have been contiguous with it.

=== Vorwerke (lower fortifications) ===
The huge fortifications recognised in the 19th century, but then misinterpreted as medieval, are also part of the Celtic complex. They have been partially obliterated by erosion and ploughing. A triple system of several hundred metres of banks and ditches enclosed and subdivided the lower terrain just west of the Heuneburg proper. Since they partially overlay the Aussensiedlung houses, the walls must have been erected in a later phase. They survive to a height of over 6 m; the ditches were originally 7 m (23 ft) deep.

==== The gate ====
Recent excavations have revealed a monumental gate in the westernmost wall. Measuring 8 by 12 m (26 by 39 ft), it was a massive construction. Its walls had a core of limestone set in a fine clay mortar, and were faced on each side with fine limestone ashlar masonry. Like the mudbrick wall on the citadel, this feature is exceptional in the Celtic world and resembles contemporary Mediterranean architecture.

== Iron Age cemeteries ==
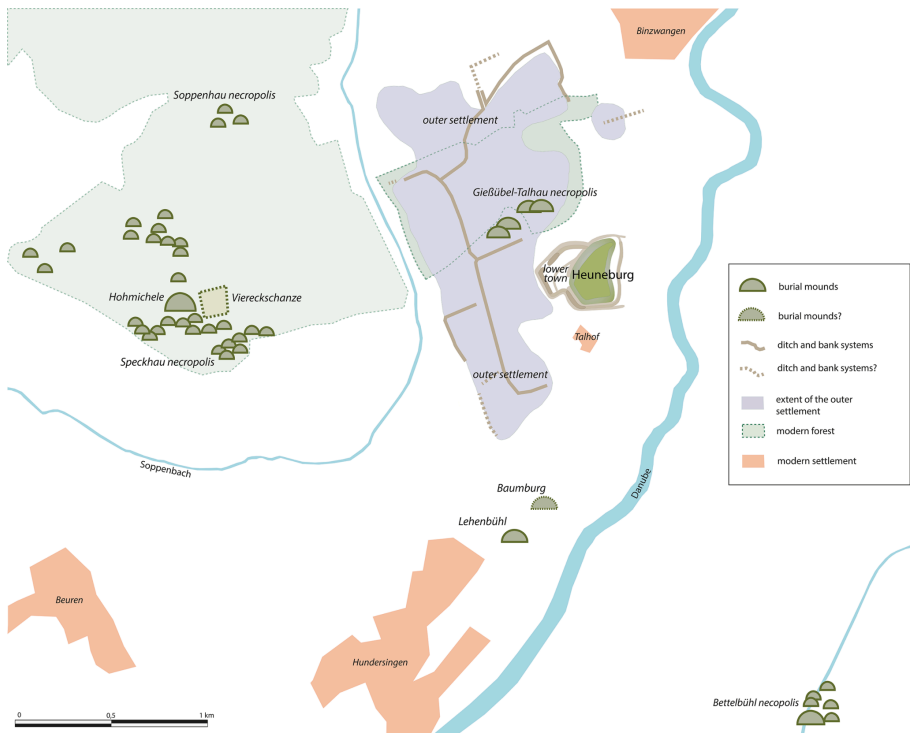
Map of the Heuneburg with the hilltop plateau, the lower town, the outer settlement and surrounding cemeteries

Several burial areas surround the Heuneburg. They consist of clusters of earthen tumuli or burial mounds. More than 50 such monuments are known in the area. Not all have been excavated. Some date from the Hallstatt period, but most are probably La Tène. The relationship between prominent fortified sites and elaborate burials is also known from other important Celtic centres, like Glauberg oppidum and grave, the Hochdorf Grave near the Hohenasperg settlement and the Vix grave near Mont Lassois.

=== Giessübel ===
The Giessübel cemetery is located 500 m (1,600 ft) northwest of the Heuneburg. It was built on top of the then abandoned west part of the Aussensiedlung. By the 19th century, four mounds remained here, each measuring c. 50 m (160 ft) in diameter and 7 m (23 ft) in height. First excavations were undertaken in the 19th century (mounds 2 and 3), but more systematic work took place between the 1950s and 1980s.

==== Grave 1 ====
This mound contained a rectangular wooden chamber (3.5 by 5.5 m [11 by 18 ft]). Its main occupant was a man aged around 50. There were also remains of two women. It had been robbed in antiquity, but modern archeological finds nevertheless included weapons, gold and bronze attachments for garments, and some amber plaques that probably once adorned a kline (couch) imported from the Mediterranean. Twenty further burials were later placed in and on the same mound.

==== Grave 4 ====
Grave 4, also robbed, contained a single individual, accompanied by the remains of metal attachments from a wooden chariot.

=== Hohmichele ===
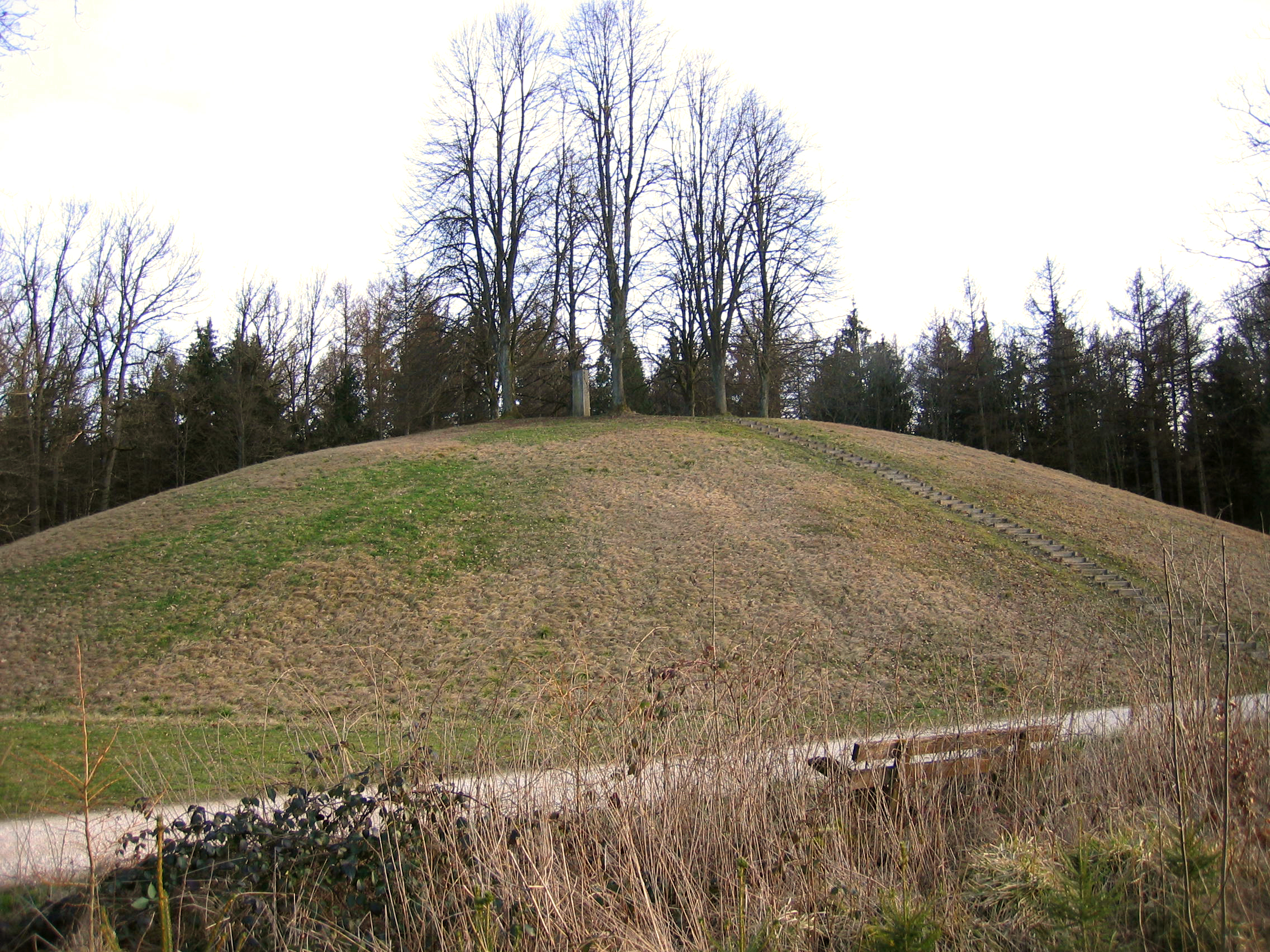
The Hohmichele burial mound.

A cluster or necropolis of burial mounds, the so-called Hohmichele Group, is located 3.5 km (2.2 mi) west of the Heuneburg. It consists of at least 36 burial mounds. The group is named after its largest mound, the Hohmichele. It is located near Altheim (Biberach district). Most of the mounds are not visible any more due to natural erosion and ploughing. The 14 or so that remain are located in forests.

==== Excavation ====
The first excavation of the main Hohmichele mound took place from 1936 to 1938, directed by Gustav Riek as part of the research programme of the SS-Ahnenerbe. Only about a third of the mound was removed during that project; the central burial chamber was located. After the war, from 1954 to 1956, Siegwalt Schiek undertook further excavations.

==== The Hohmichele mound ====
With a diameter of 85 m (279 ft) and a height of over 13 m (43 ft), the Hohmichele is one of the largest Celtic tumuli in Europe. Excavation has mainly concentrated on its central and eastern portions. The mound was used from the late 7th to the late 6th century BC. 13 burials were located within the mound, several of them accompanied by grave offerings. The mound was restored to its original dimensions in 1960. Today, it is visible as a vegetation-covered landmark in a small forest clearing. A modern war memorial is located on its summit.

==== Grave I ====
The centre of the mound contained an oak-built main chamber (Grave I), built on the original ground level. It measured 5.7 by 3.5 m (19 by 11 ft) and was c. 1 m (3 ft) high. This grave, containing a man and a woman, had already been plundered shortly after the burial. The remaining finds, reflecting its original riches include horse trappings, nearly 600 glass beads from a necklace, pieces of amber, and fine gold threads that were originally part of a brocade-like fabric. The floor had been covered with cowskins. A central mound, 5 m (16 ft) high and 40 m (130 ft) in diameter covered this chamber.

==== Grave VI ====
Twelve m (39 ft) southeast of the central chamber and about 2.2 m (7 ft 3 in) above the old ground surface lay an unplundered wooden chamber (grave VI). It measured 3 by 2.4 m (9.8 by 7.9 ft) and was 1 m (3 ft) high. This grave also contained a man and a woman. Their equipment included a four-wheeled chariot with trappings for two horses, bronze eating and drinking vessels, a quiver with 51 iron arrowheads, an iron knife and many amber and glass beads (from necklaces), including 2,300 green glass beads. The woman had been laid in the chariot, the man on the floor. The bronze vessels were placed by their feet and heads. There were also remains of embroidered fabrics.

==== Grave IX ====
Grave IX, a so-called pyre grave, was located 1 m (3 ft) above VI. Its occupant was a woman who had died between 18 and 30 years of age, her remains accompanied by two bronze armlets and over 20 pottery vessels with incised and stamped decorations and red paint.

==== Other graves ====
Six further graves (II-V, VII, VIII) were inhumations. 22 fireplaces found within the mound are probably connected to cult activity. Some or all of them may represent funerary pyres.

== Gallery ==
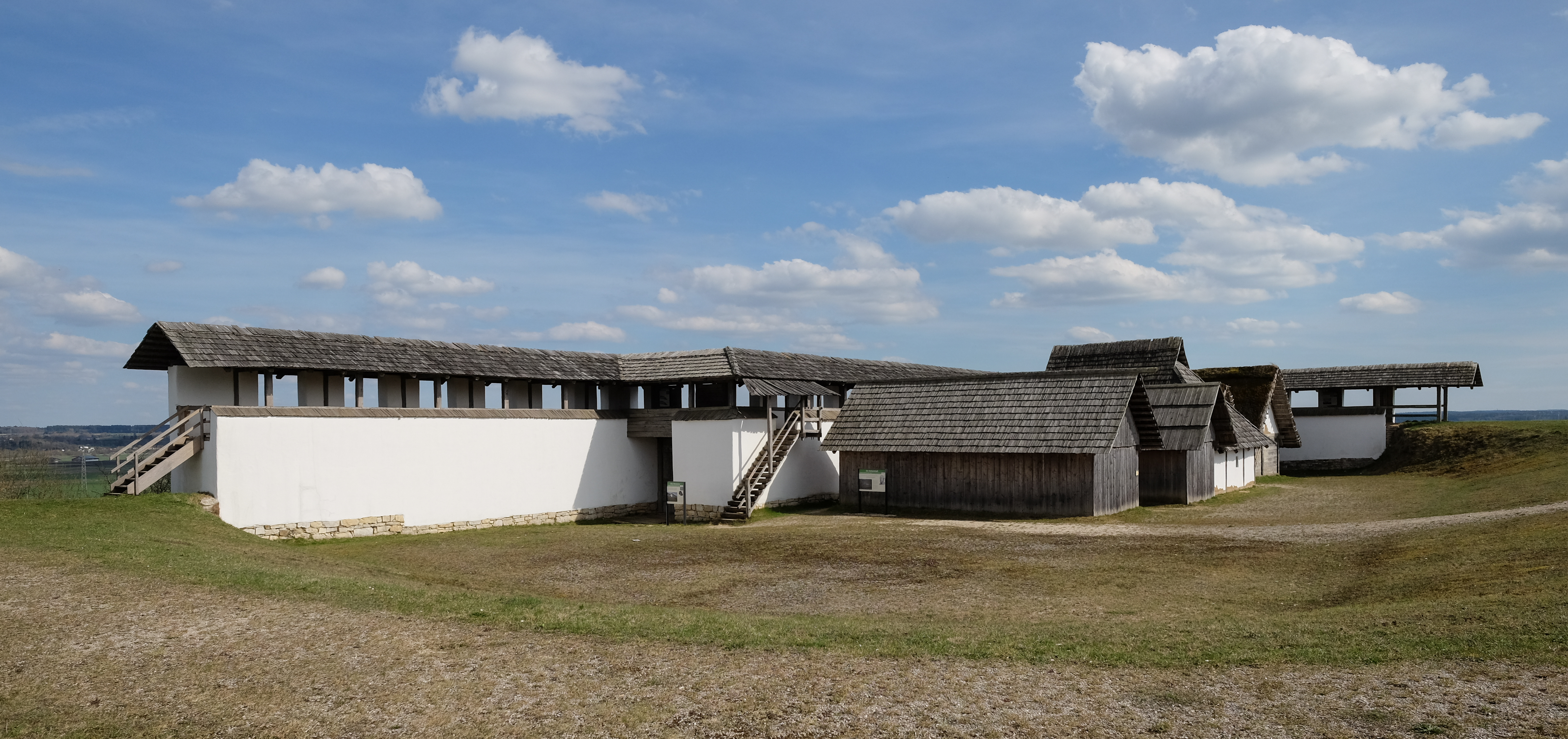
Reconstructed wall and buildings

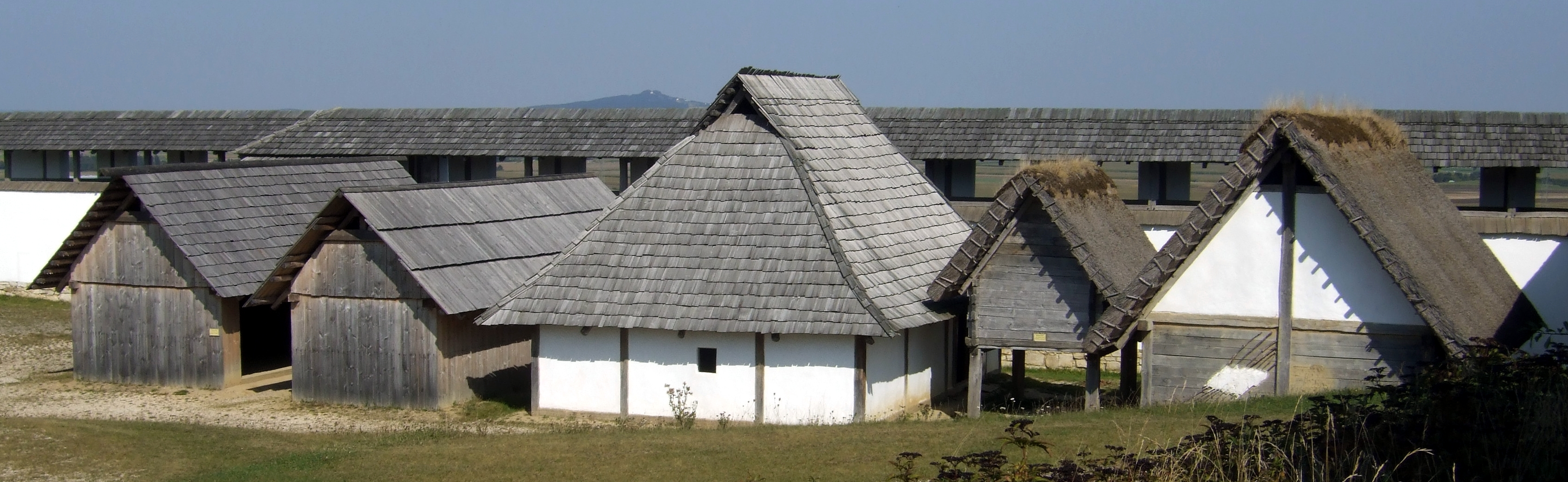
Reconstructed buildings

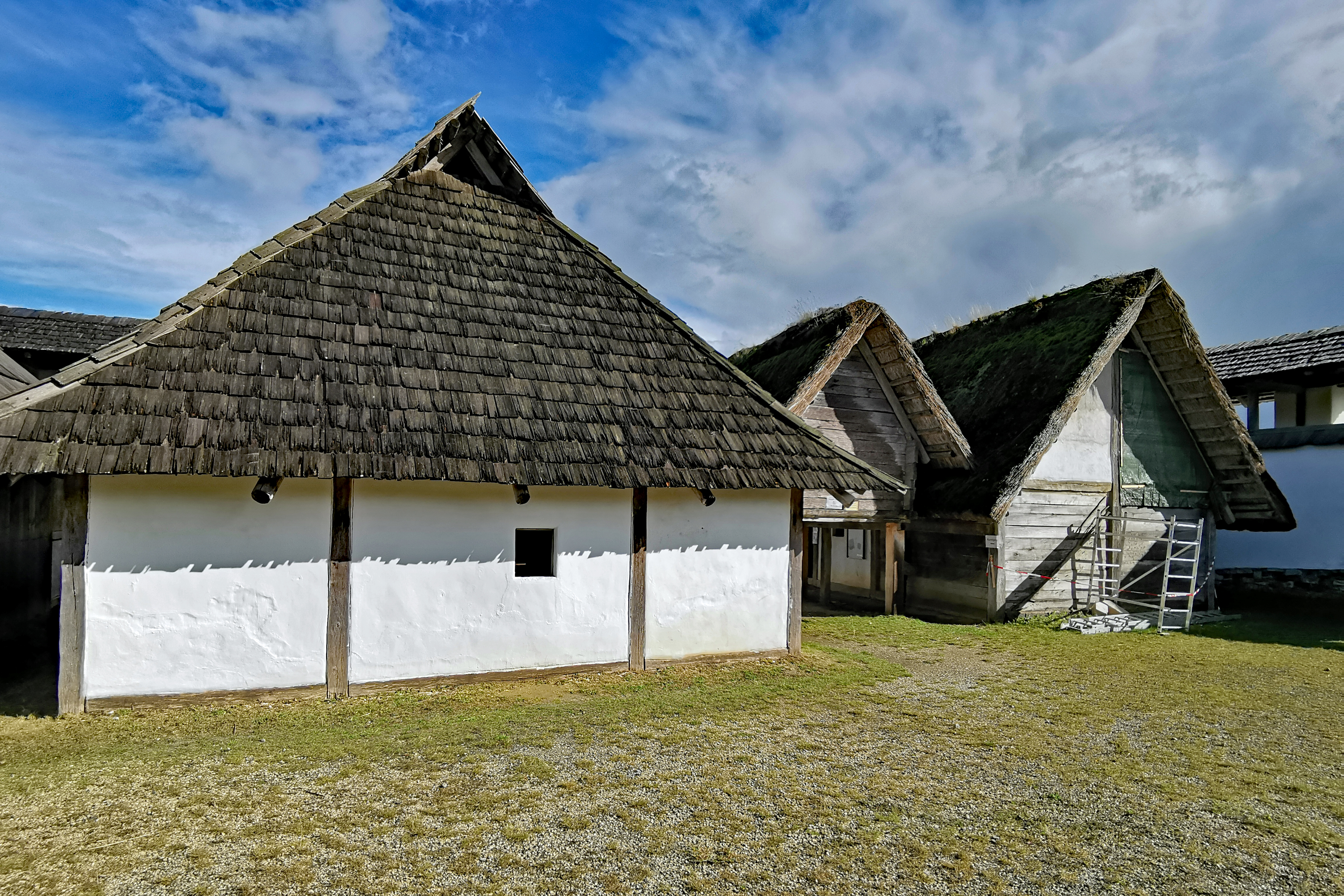
Reconstructed buildings

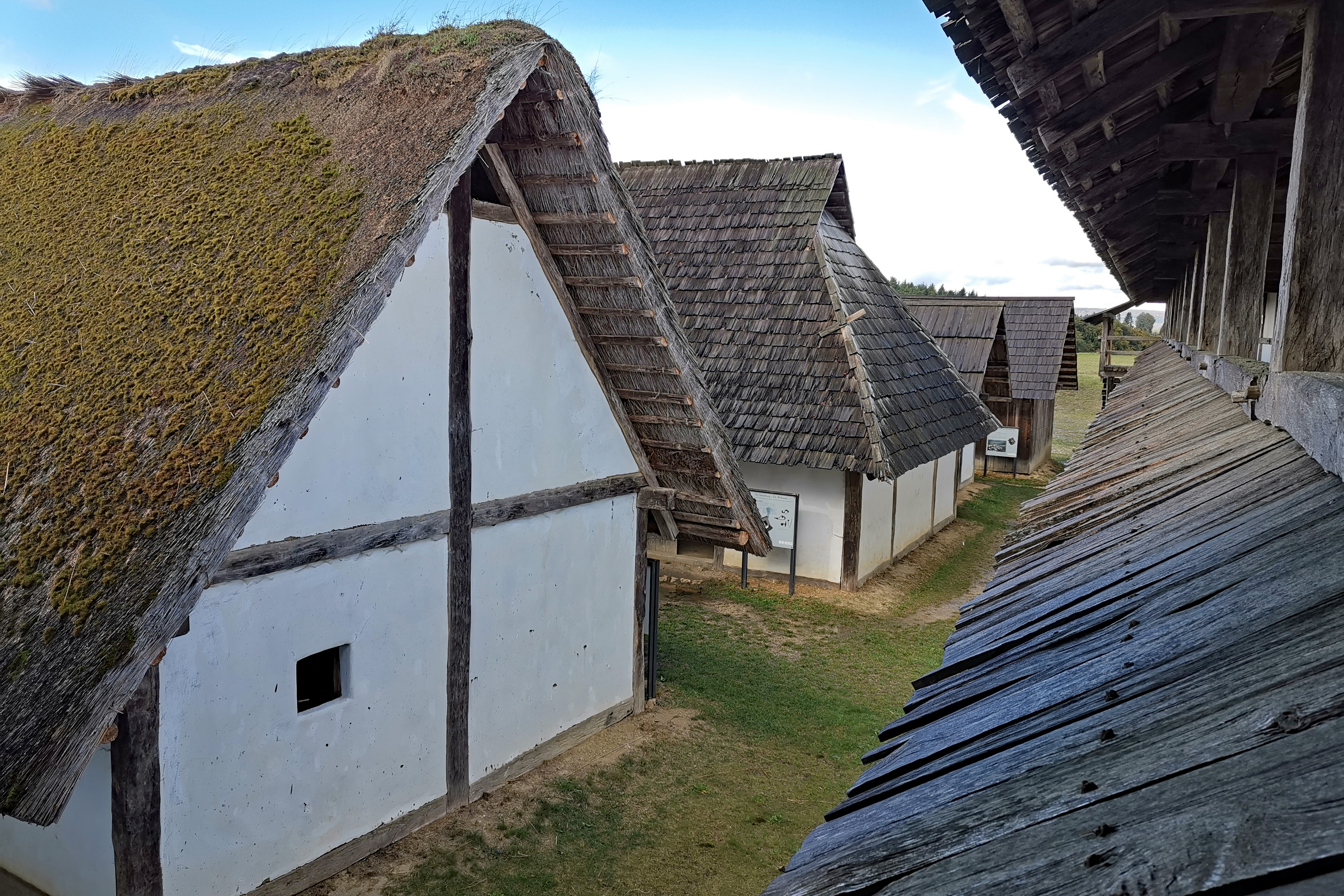
Reconstructed buildings

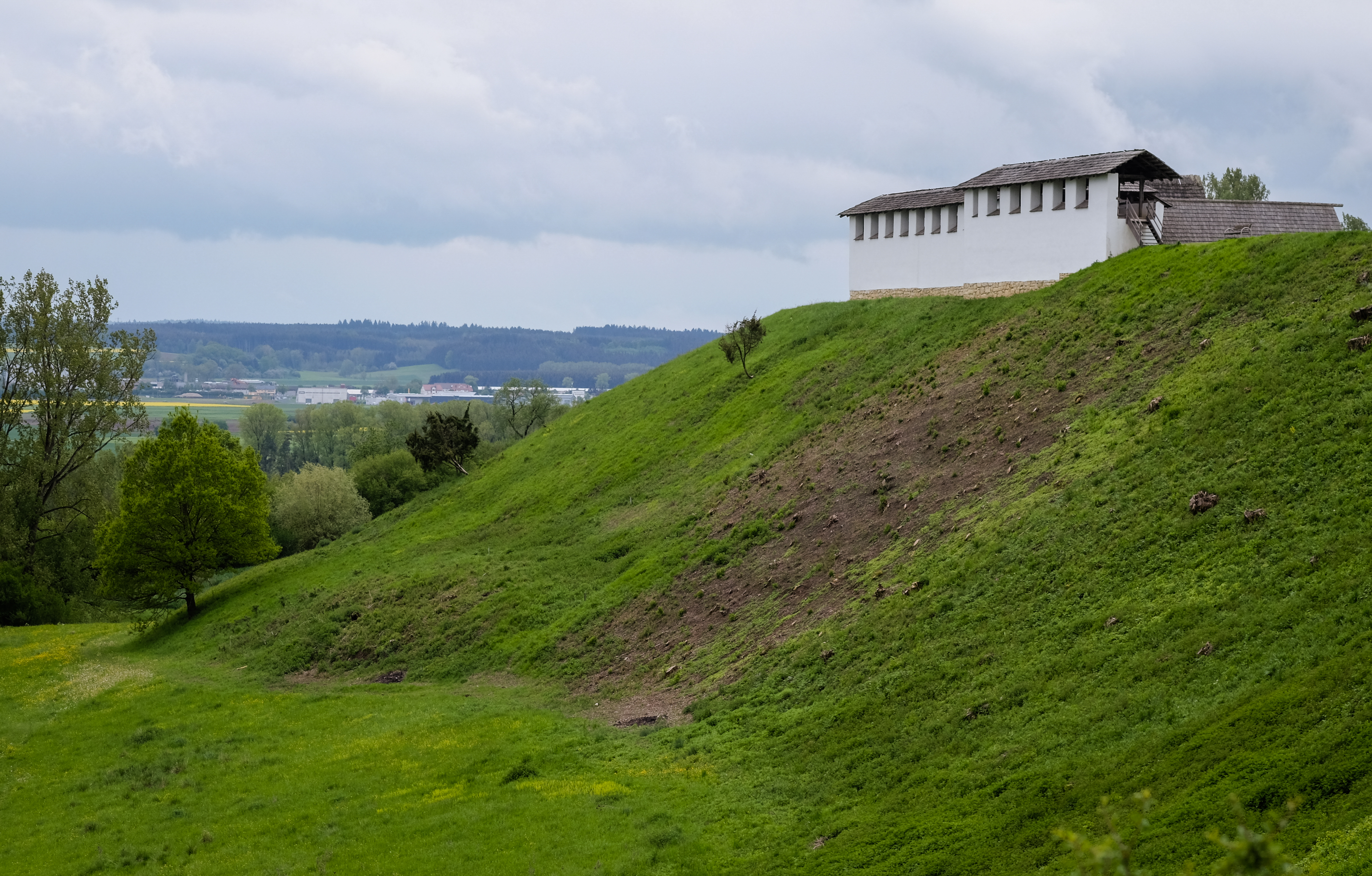
Reconstructed fortification wall exterior

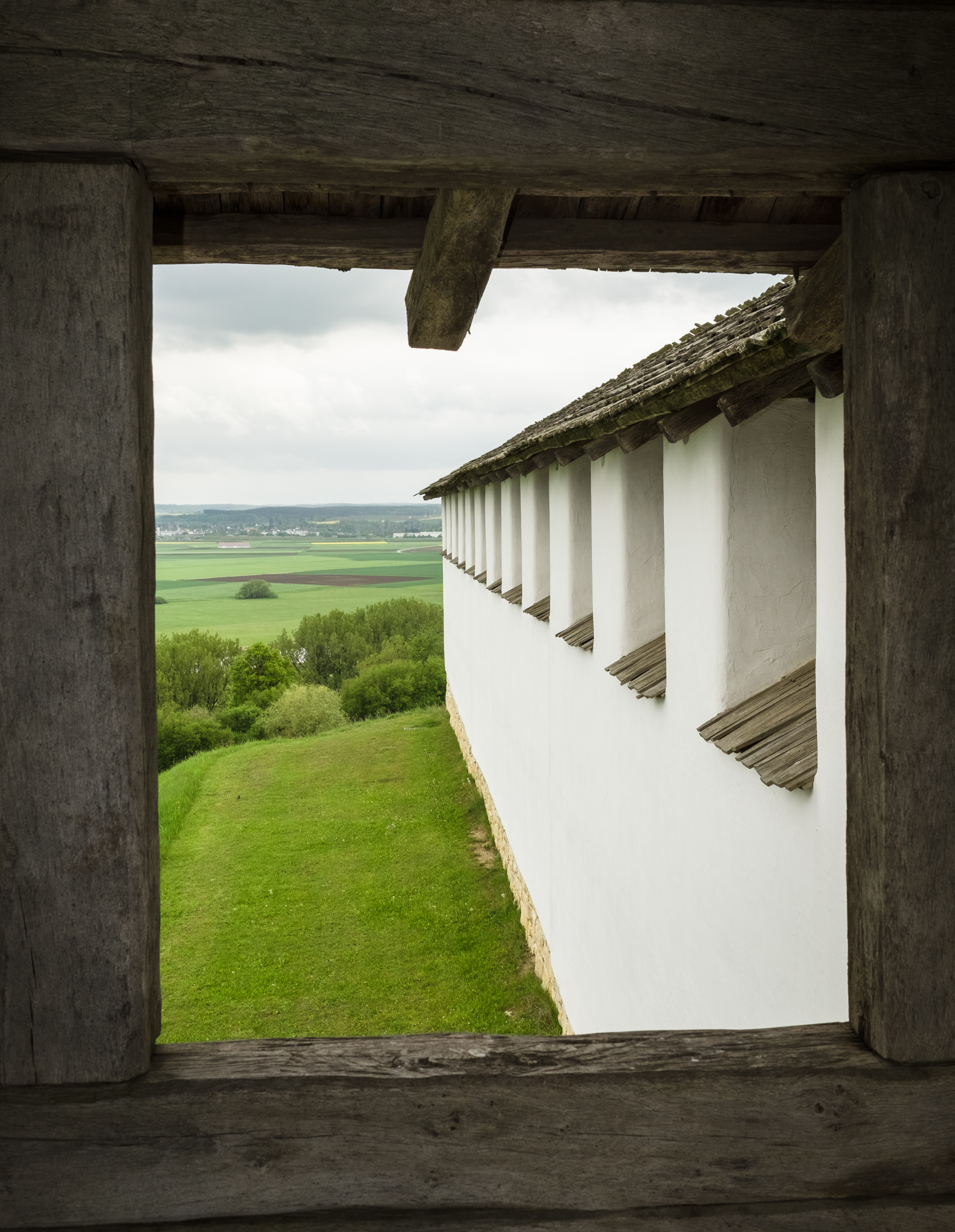
View of the fortification wall

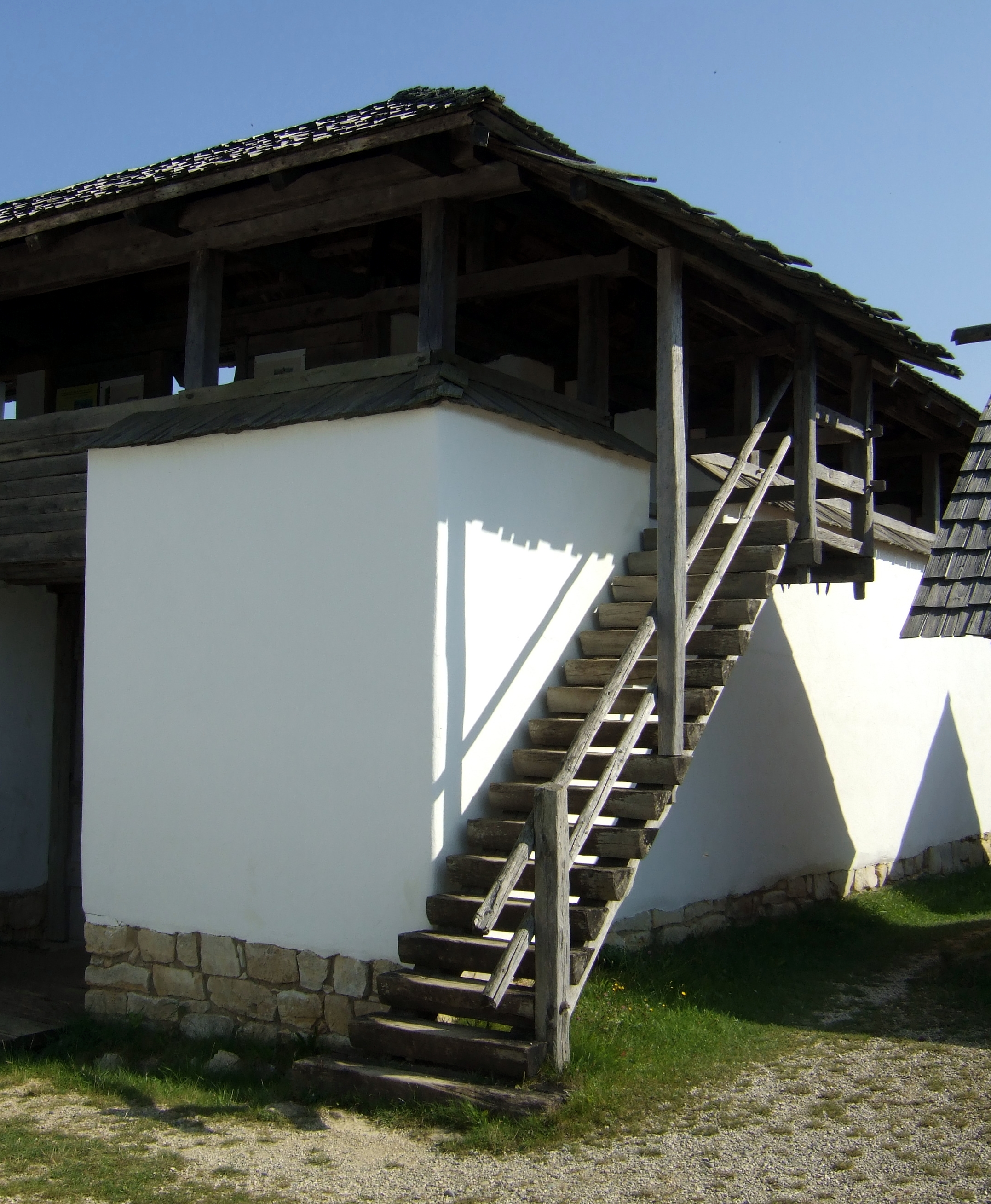
Reconstructed fortification wall interior

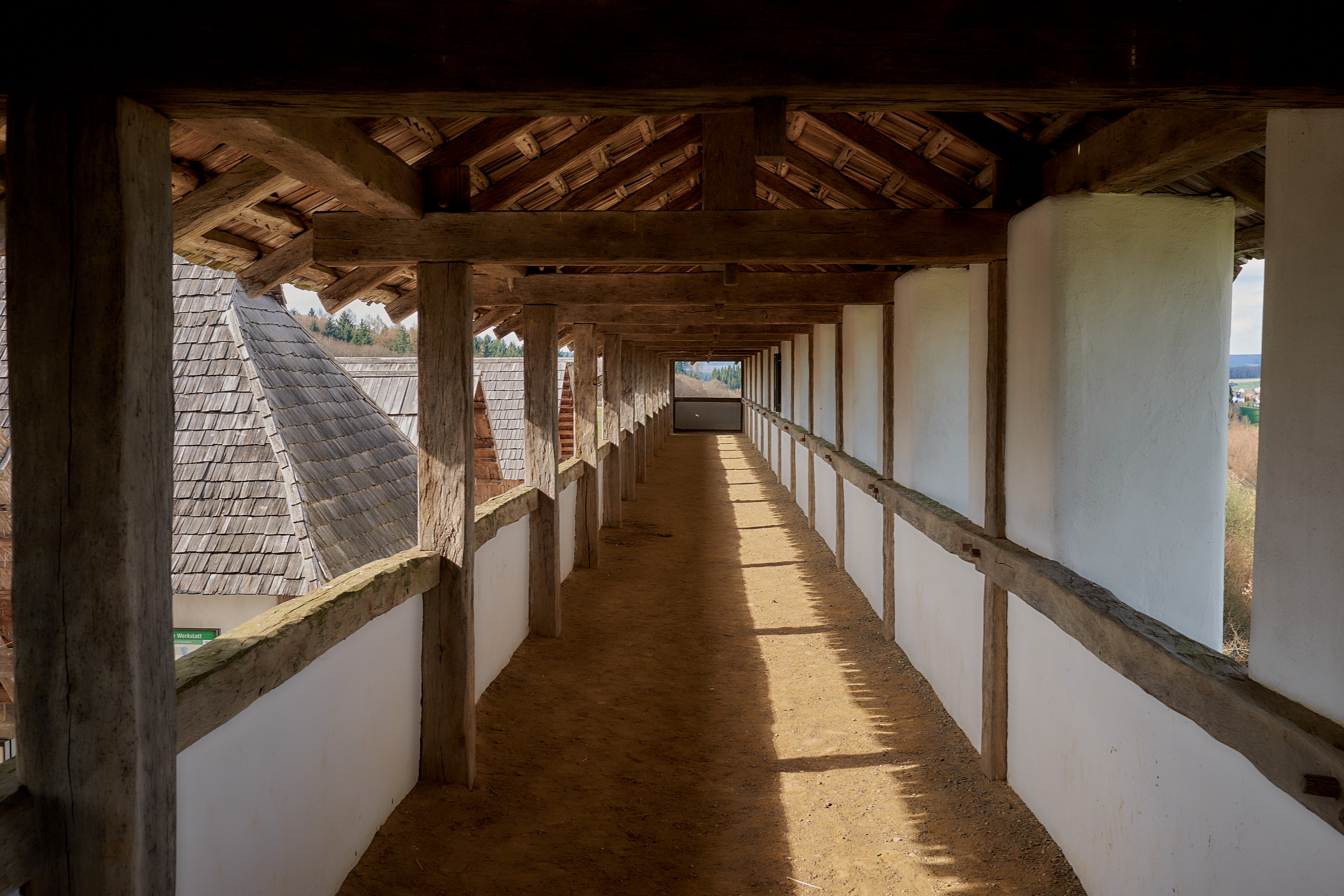
Inside the fortification wall ramparts

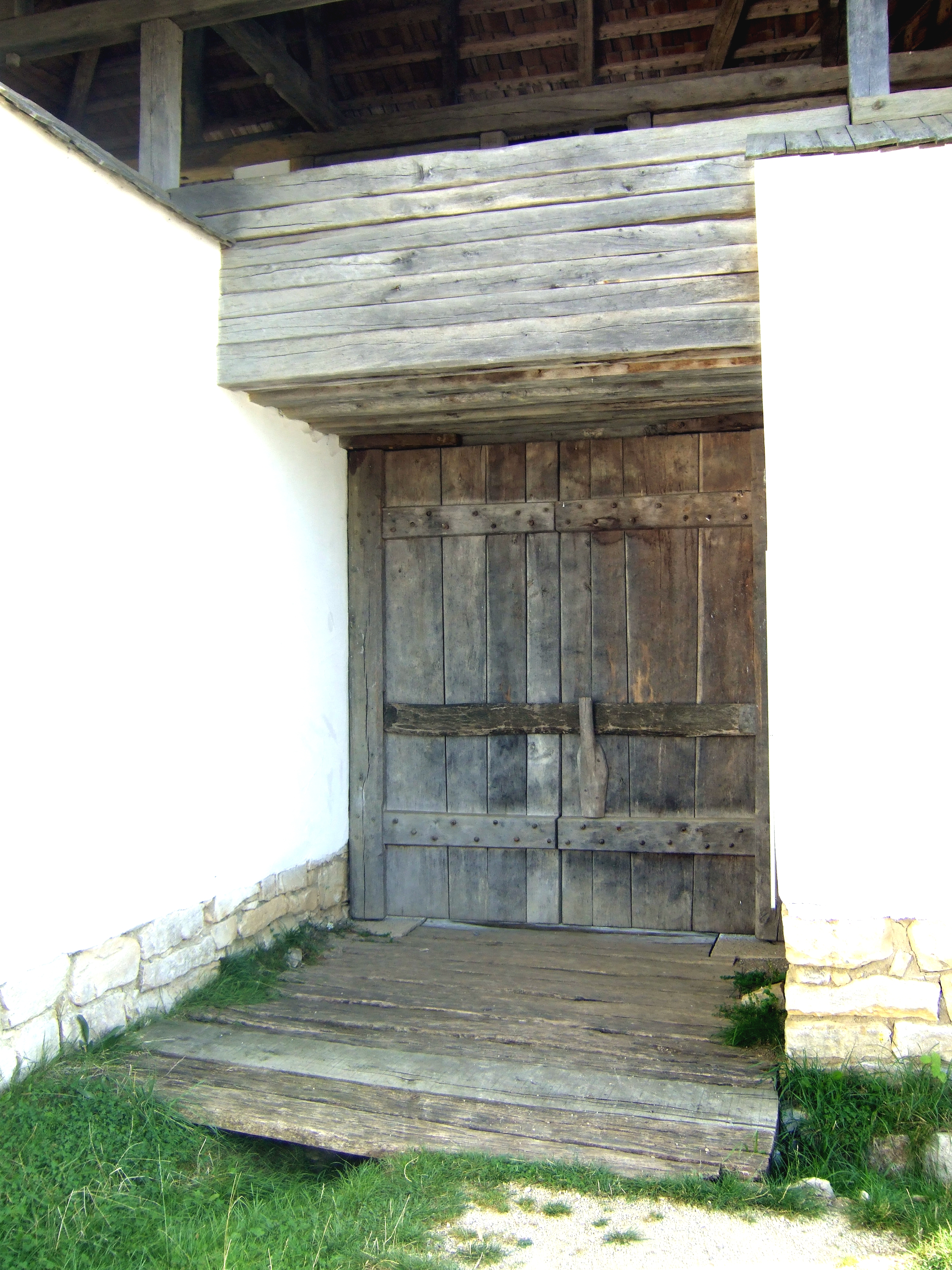
Side entrance gate

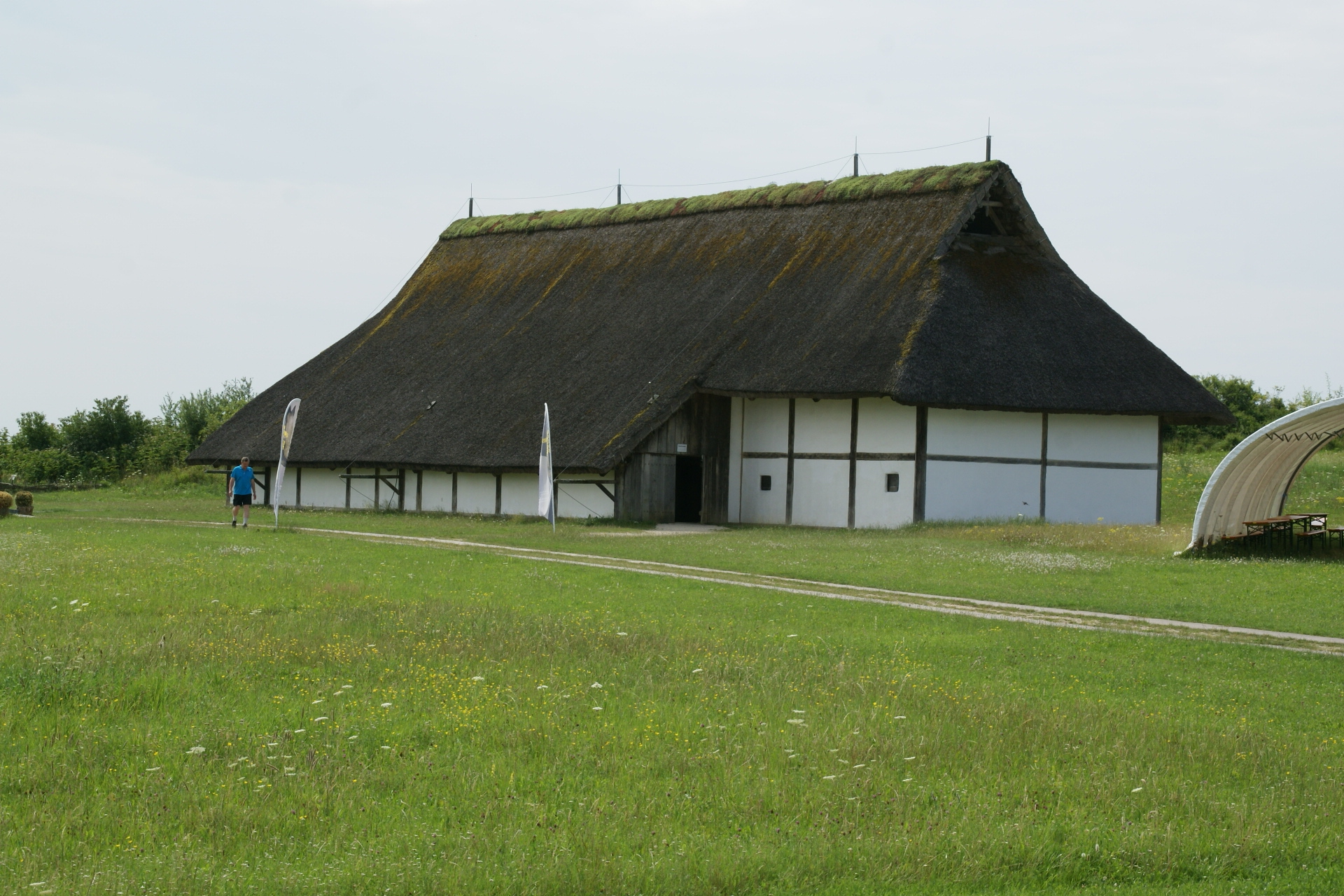
Large reconstructed building

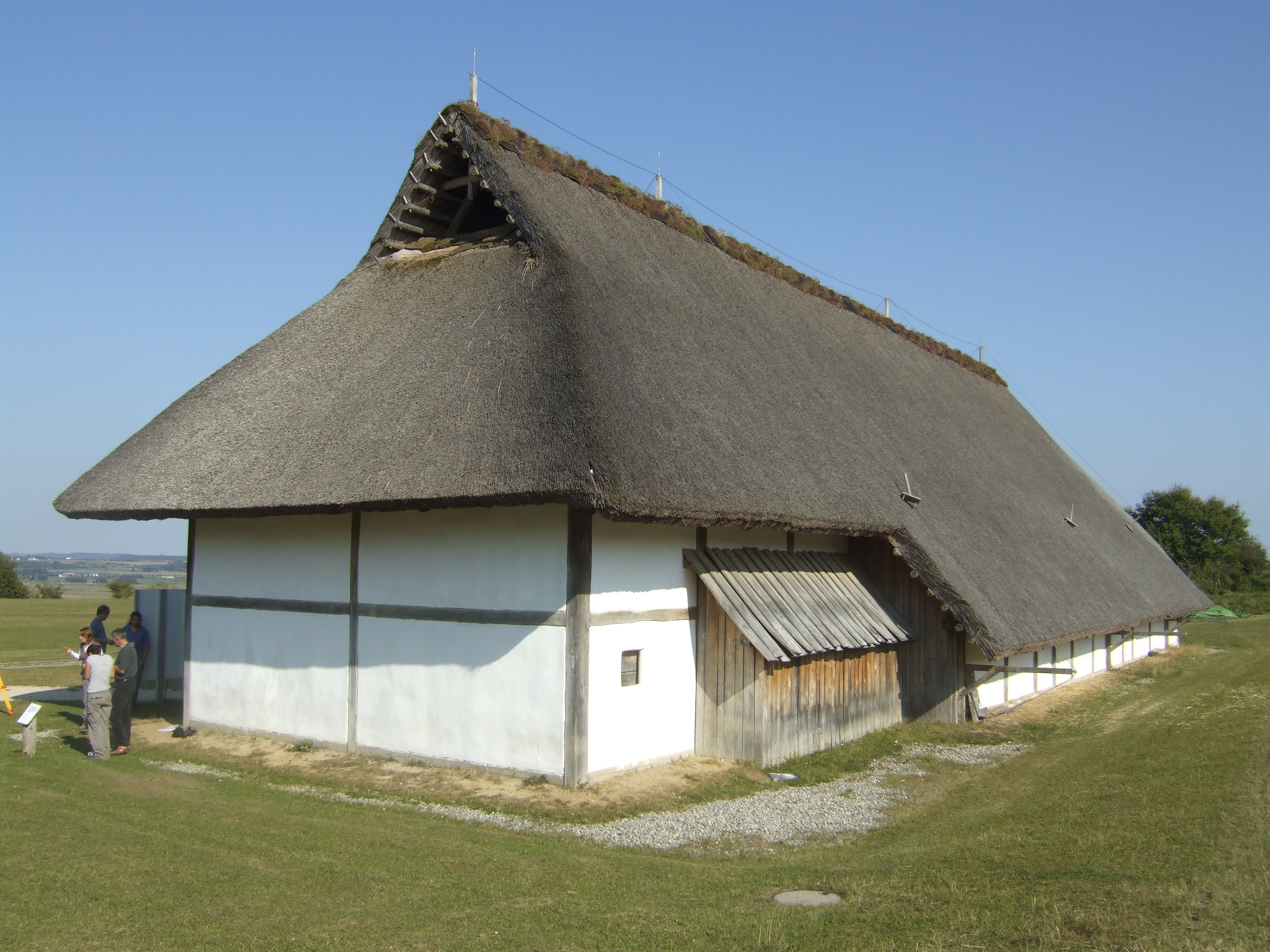
Large reconstructed building

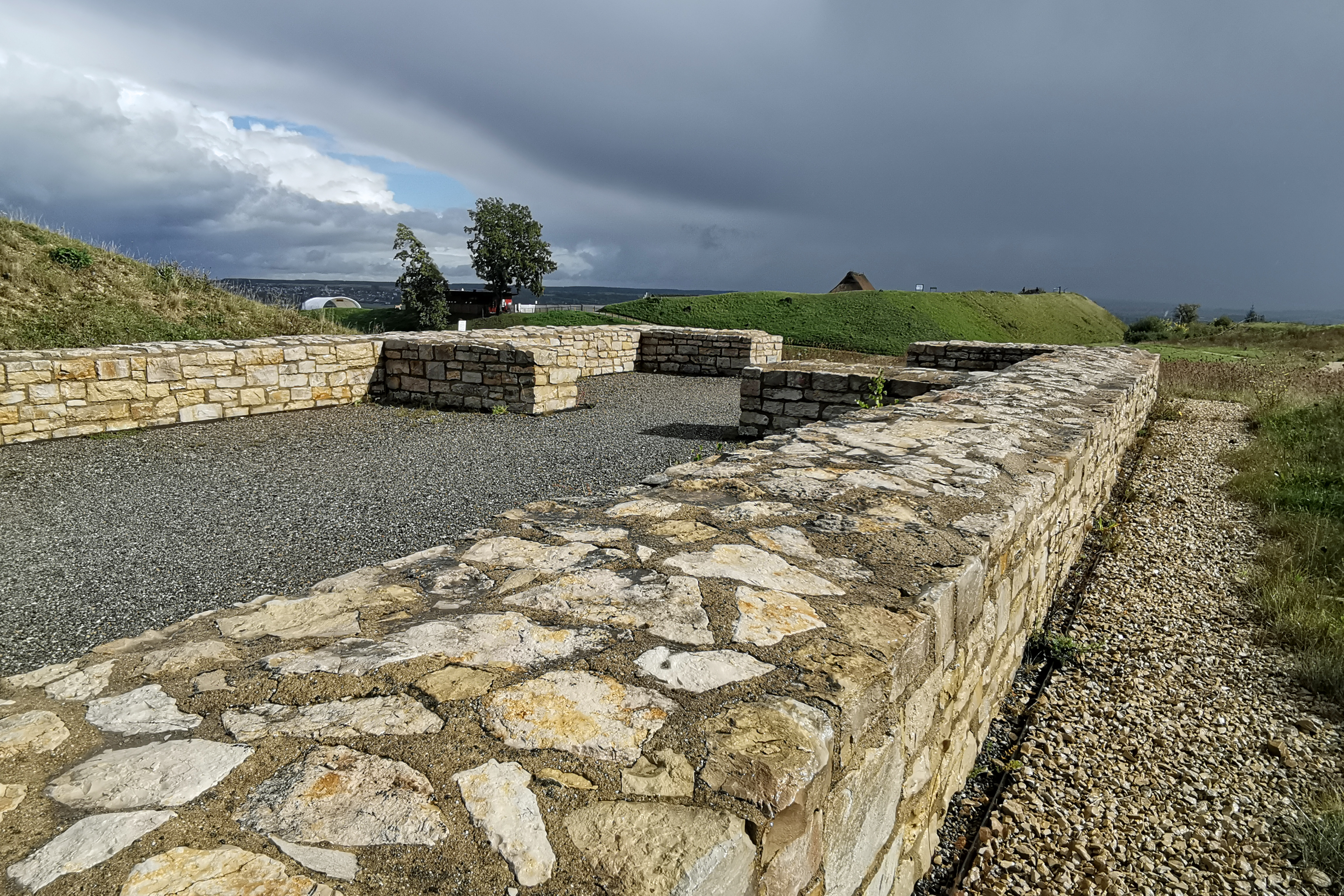
Main entrance gate foundations

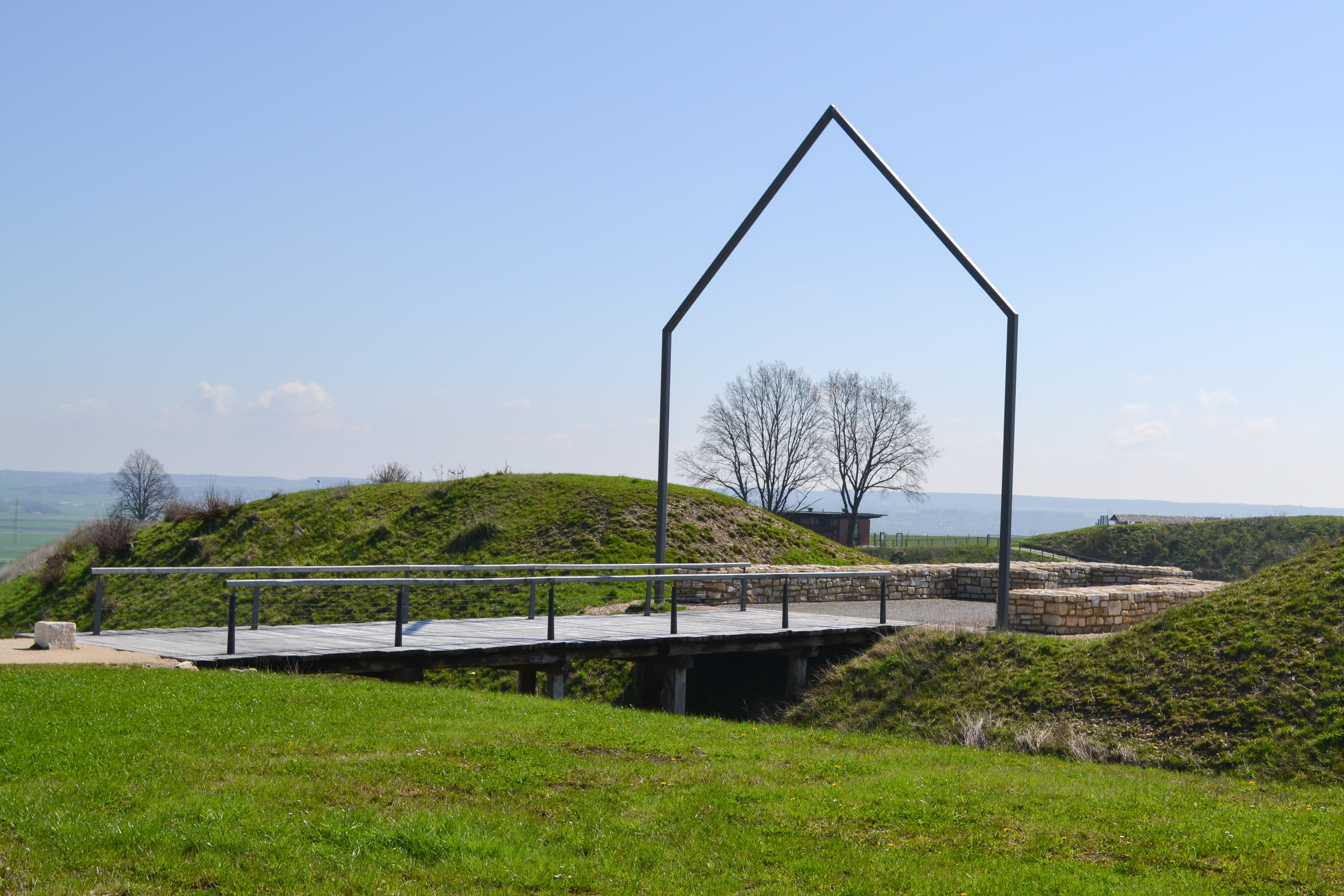
Frame showing main entrance gate dimensions

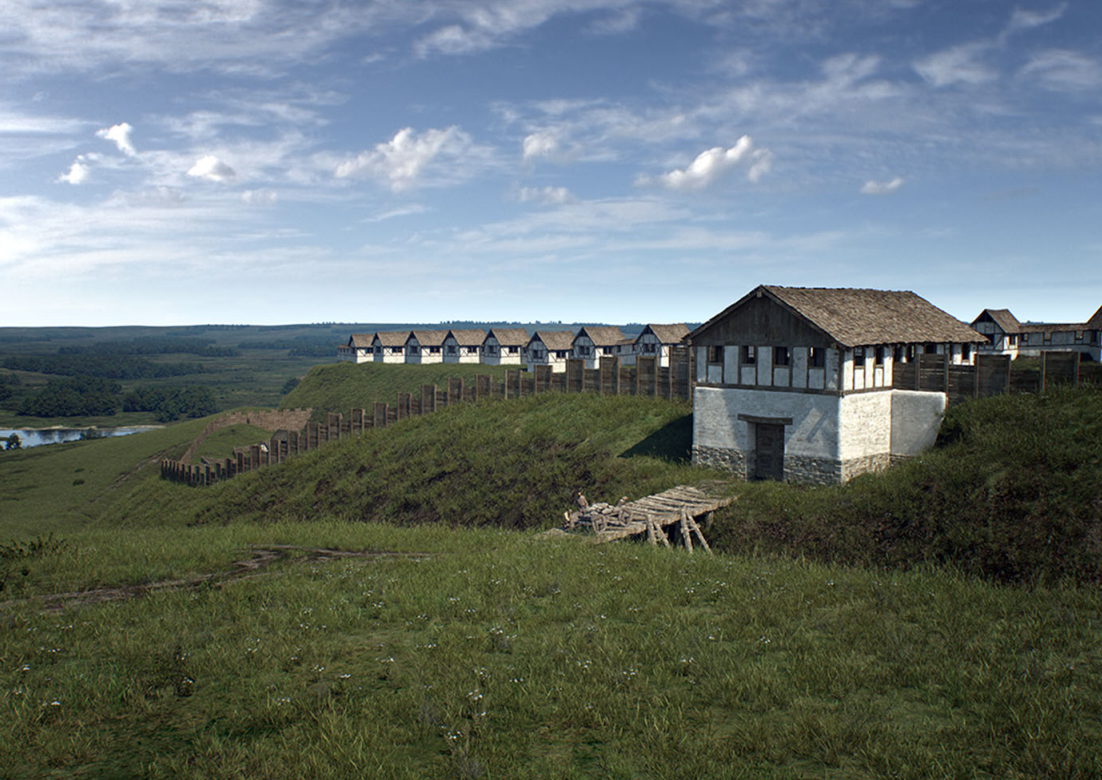
Entrance gate, digital reconstruction

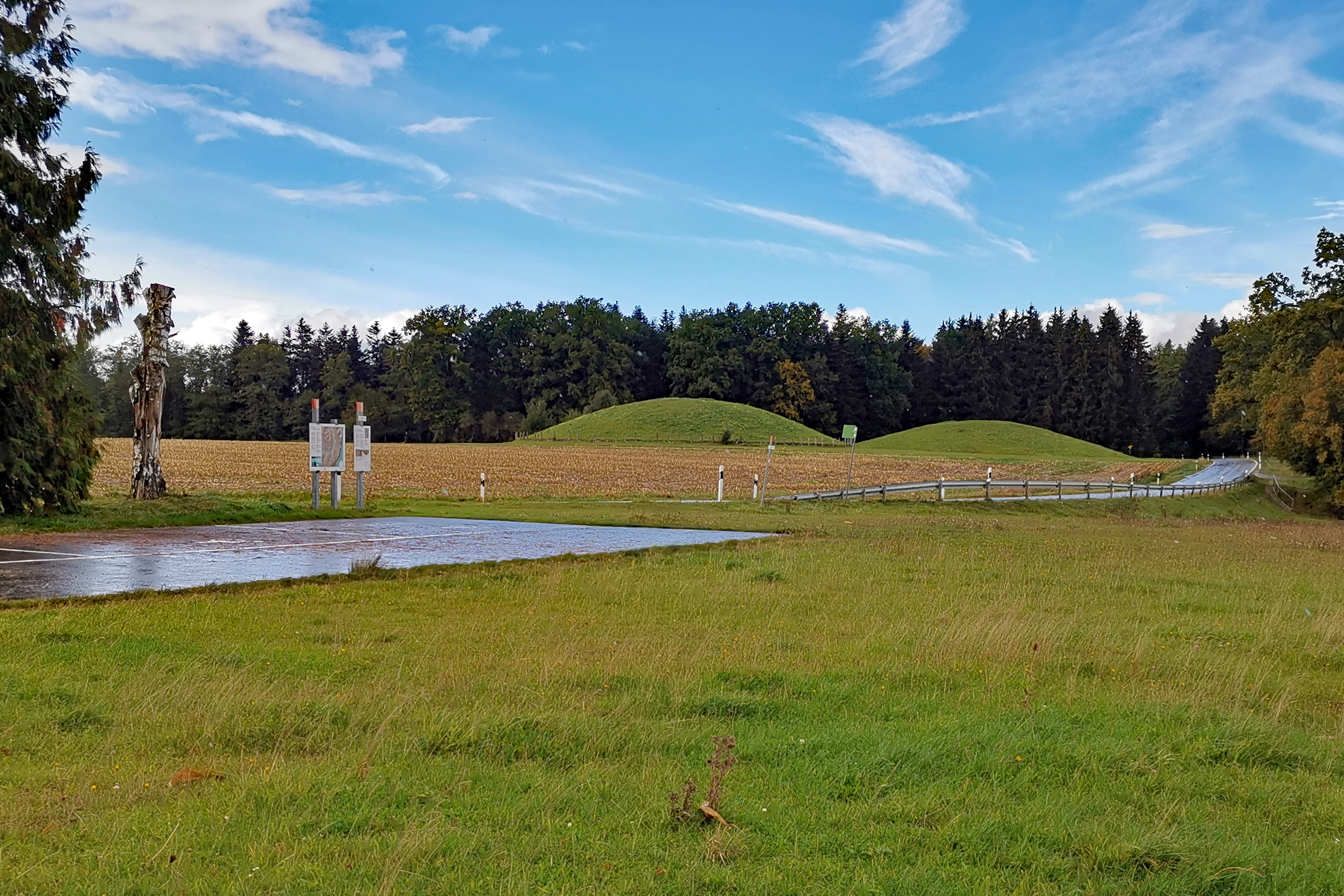
Burial mounds

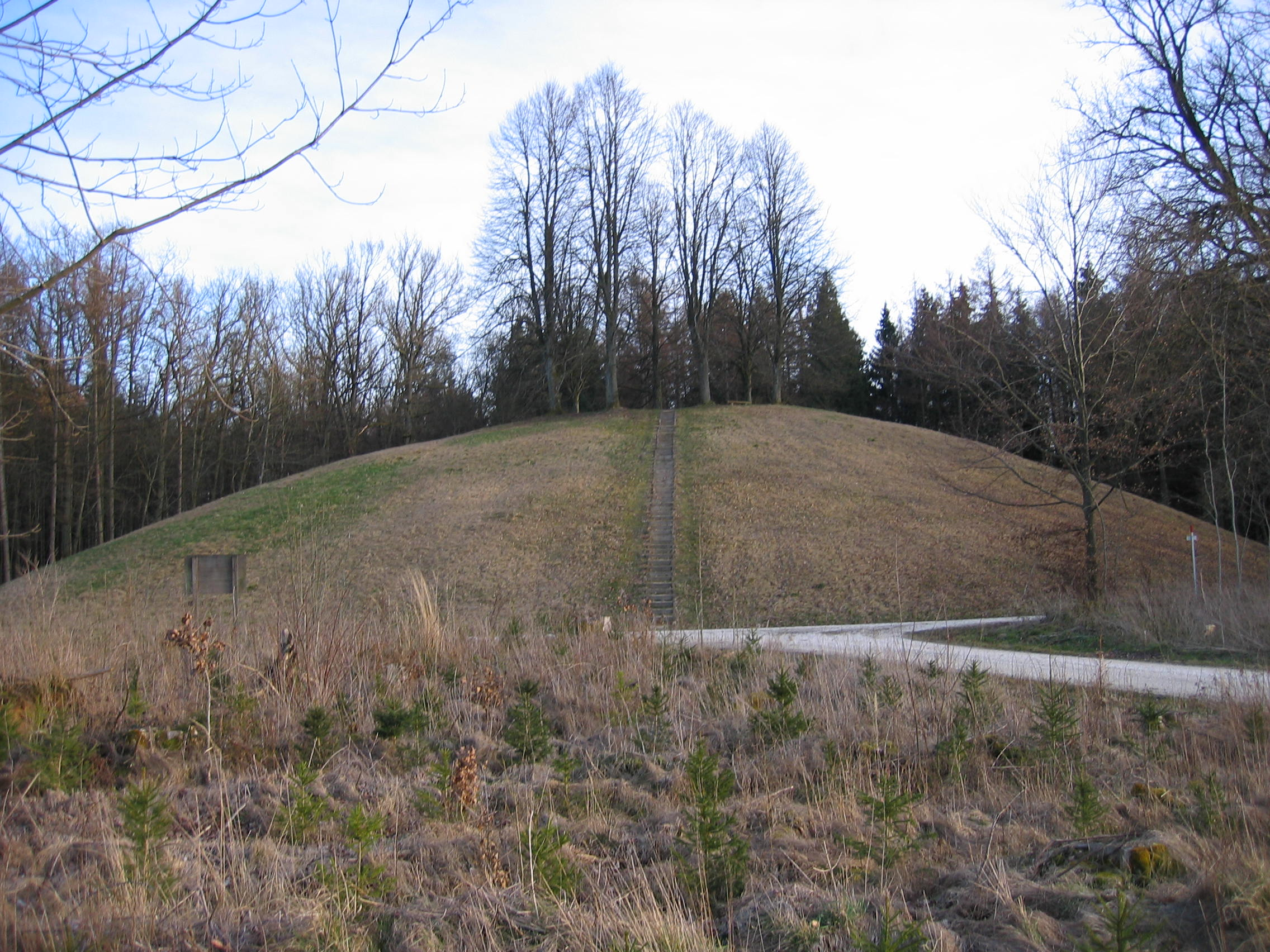
Hohmichele burial mound

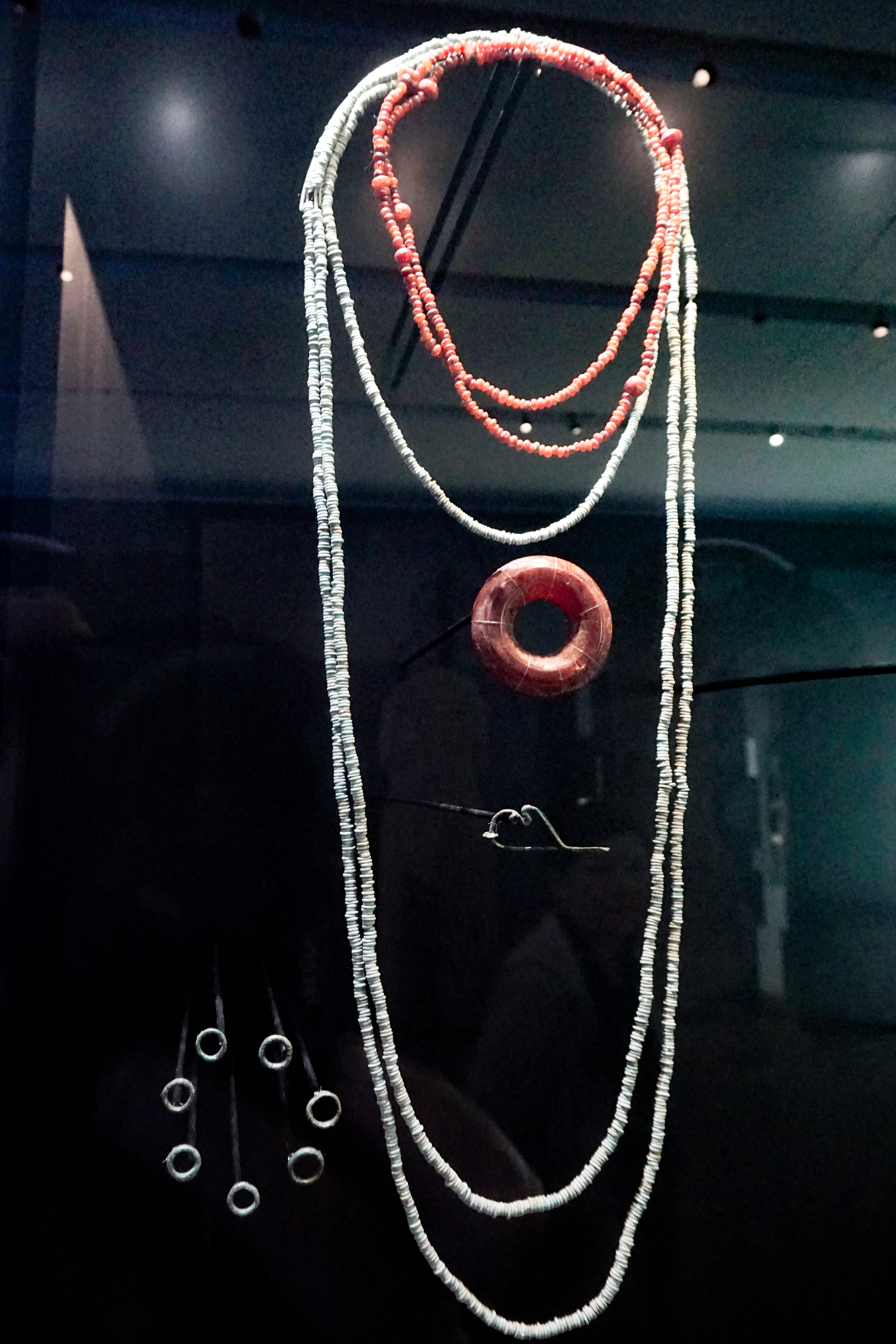
Jewellery from the Hohmichele burial mound

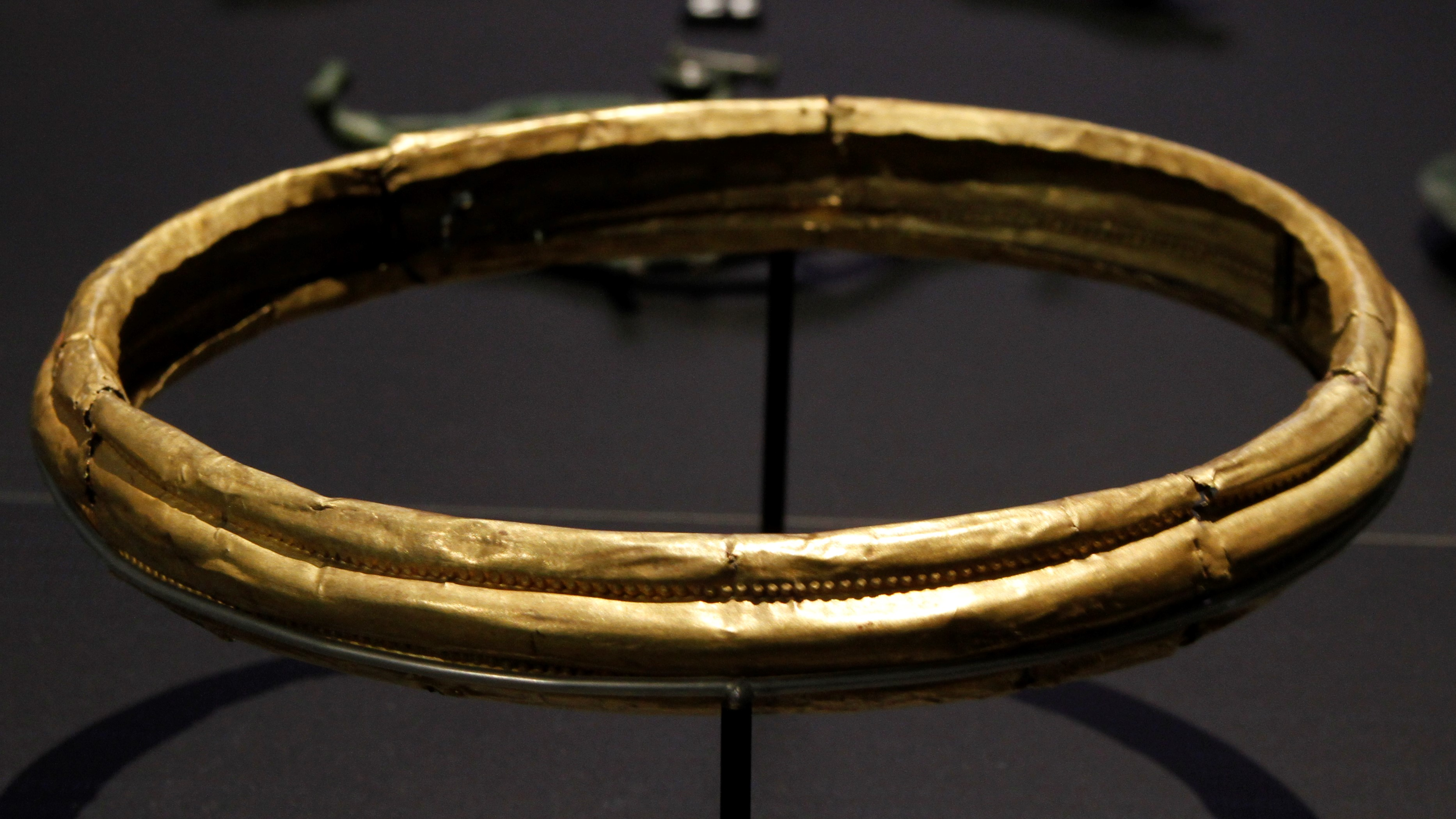
Gold necklace from a Heuneburg burial

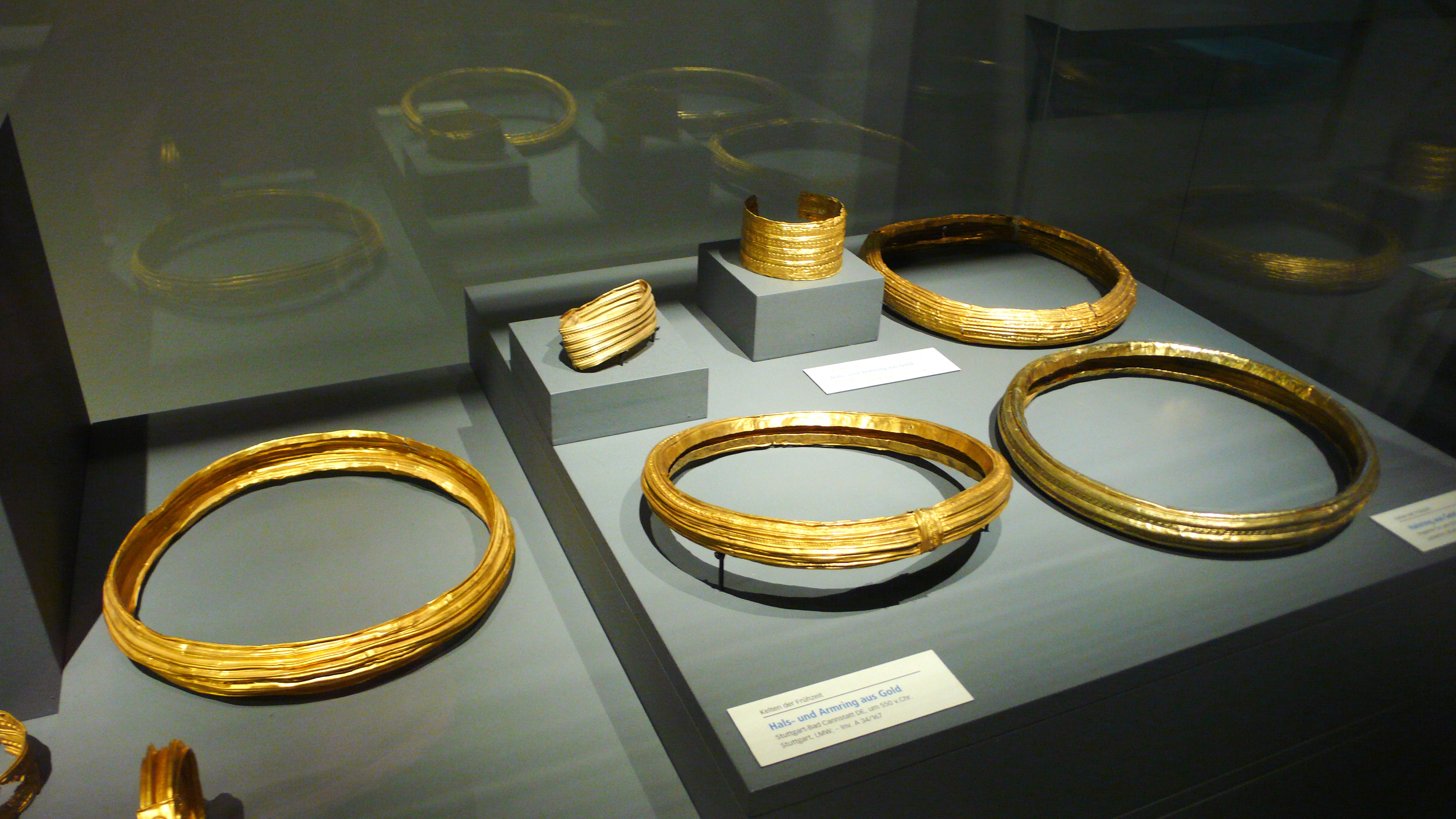
Gold artefacts from a Heuneburg burial

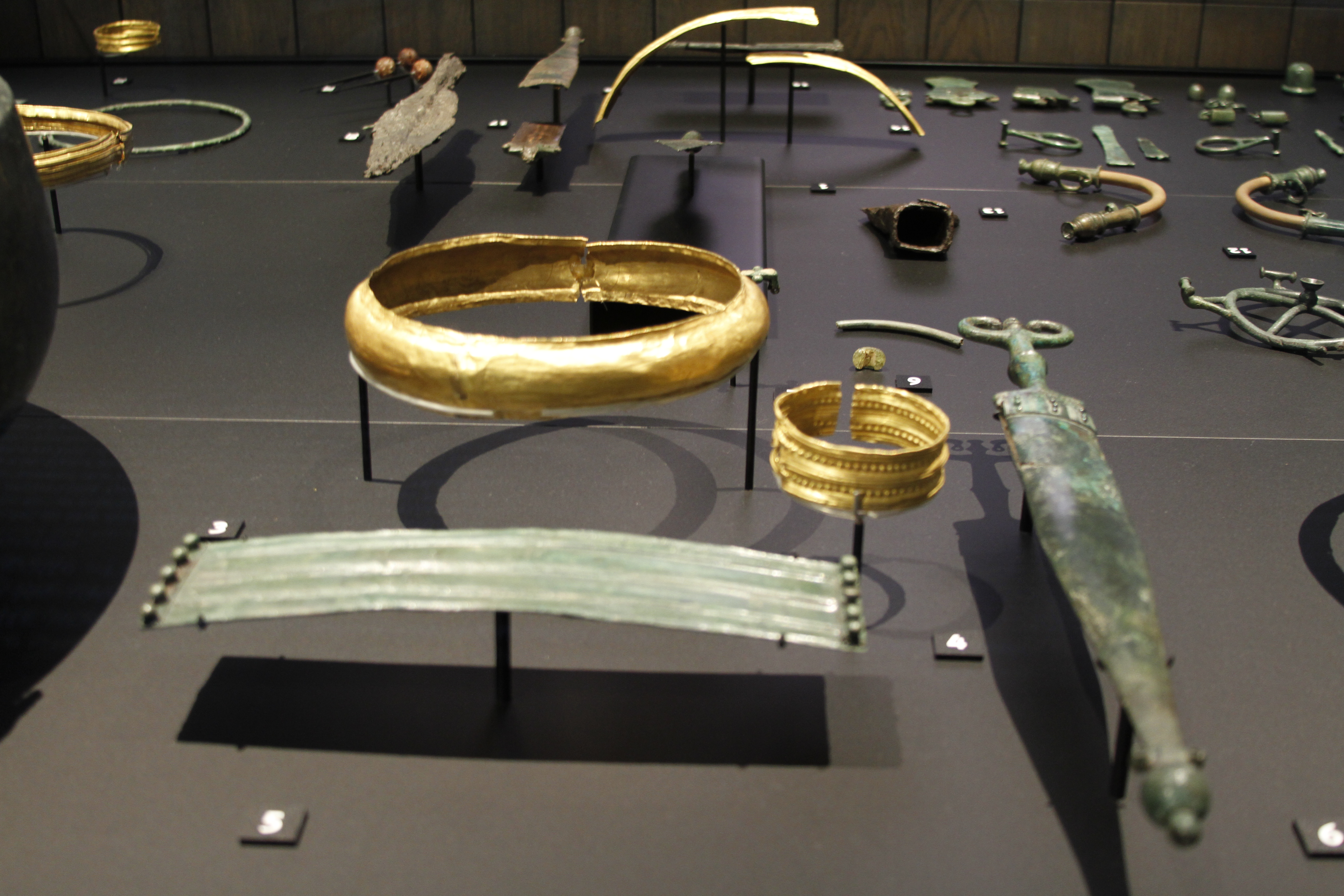
Gold and iron artefacts from a Heuneburg burial

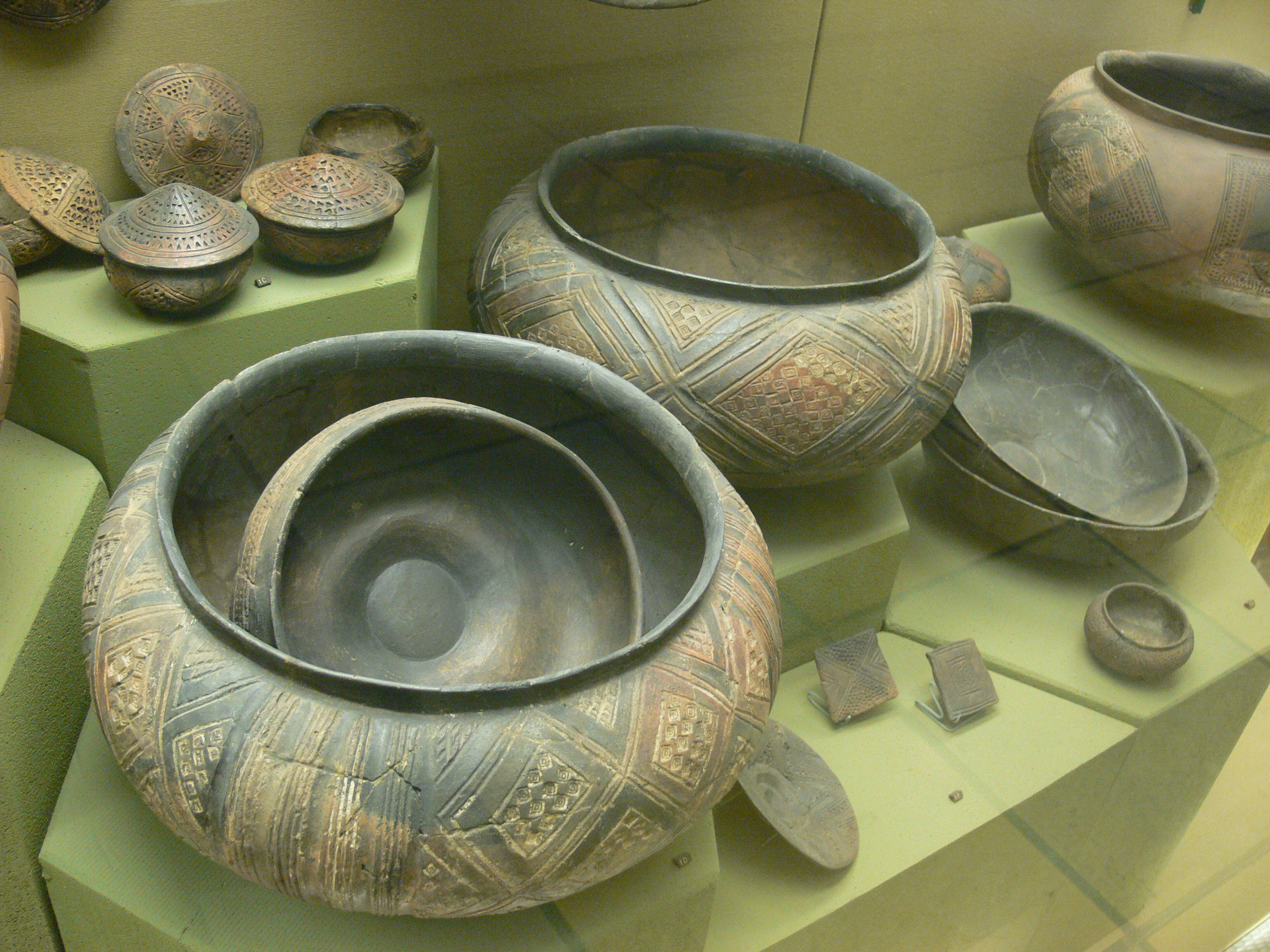
Celtic pottery from the Hohmichele mound

== Interpretation and significance ==
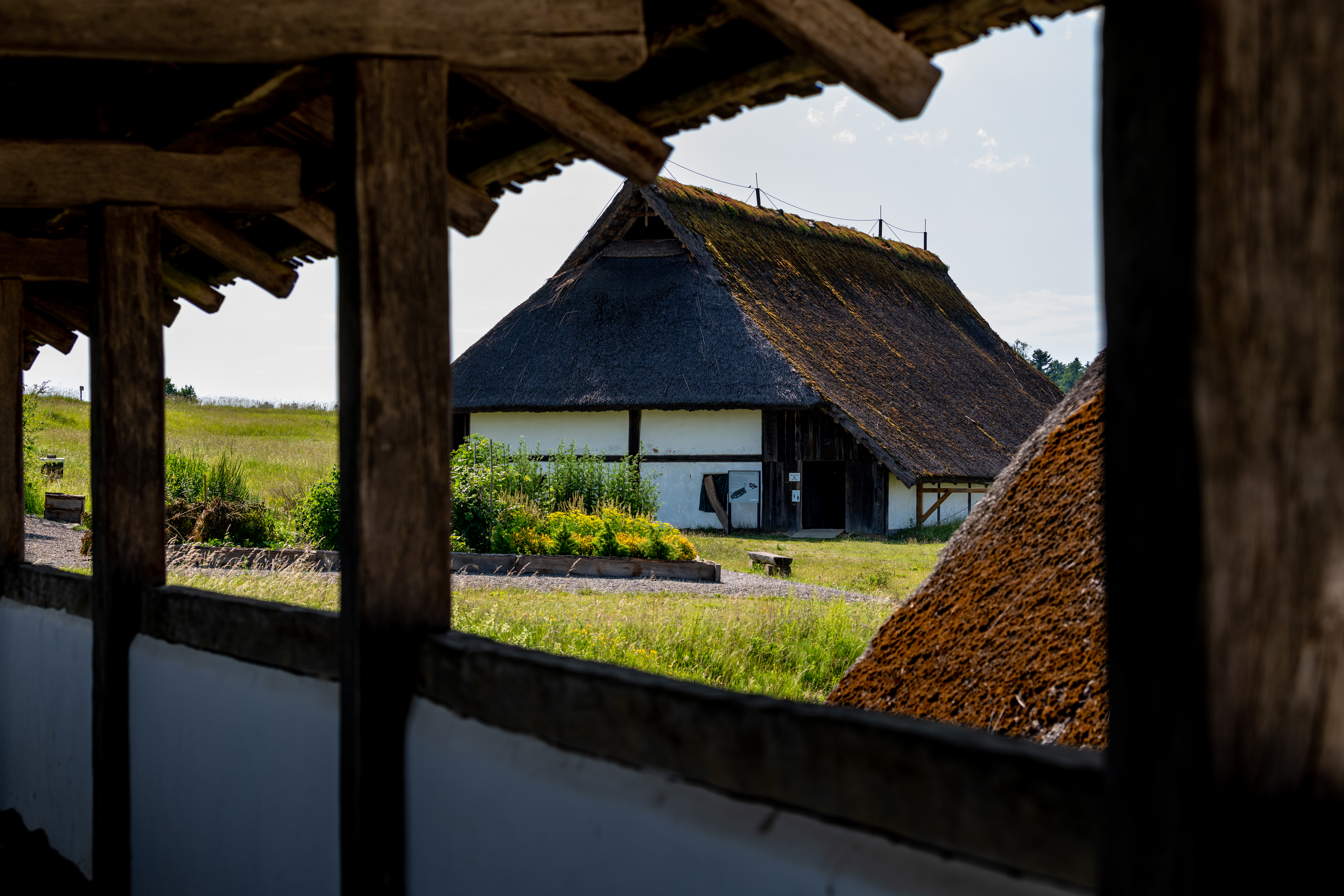
Reconstructed buildings

There can be no doubt that the Heuneburg and its associated monuments are one of the most important centres of the early Celtic Iron Age in Central Europe. It is also clear that the site should be seen in a context with other prominent centres of its time, the so-called Fürstensitze (German: "princely seats" - see below).

=== Social/economic development ===
The Heuneburg settlement reflects important sociopolitical developments in early Celtic Europe. It appears to be the case that after 700 BC, in some regions, wealth and population became concentrated in relatively small areas, a development that further accelerated after 600 BC. A growing differentiation in terms of wealth that is visible among settlements sites but especially among burials, indicates the development of social hierarchies. This is illustrated by the discovery, in 2005, of the burial of a 2-year-old child near the Heuneburg, accompanied by imported (Etruscan) jewellery. It is clear that a young child could not have earned or gained such wealth, hence the individual must have been born rich. There is probably also an element of political centralisation involved in these processes. The fact that the Heuneburg and Aussensiedlung were not able to locally produce enough food to support their own populations implied quite clearly that they must have been able to receive and maintain the support of a much larger surrounding area. The ongoing social and professional specialisation had led to the development of specialised workshops, perhaps even artisanal quarters that did not just produce to serve local needs.

==== The term Fürstensitz ====
The traditional term Fürstensitz ("princely seat") to describe sites like Heuneburg has been criticised recently, especially by the archaeologist Manfred Eggert (University of Tübingen). It could be argued that the phrase implies a potentially misleading interpretation of power structures, potentially distracting from more complex realities.

=== Interaction with other sites ===
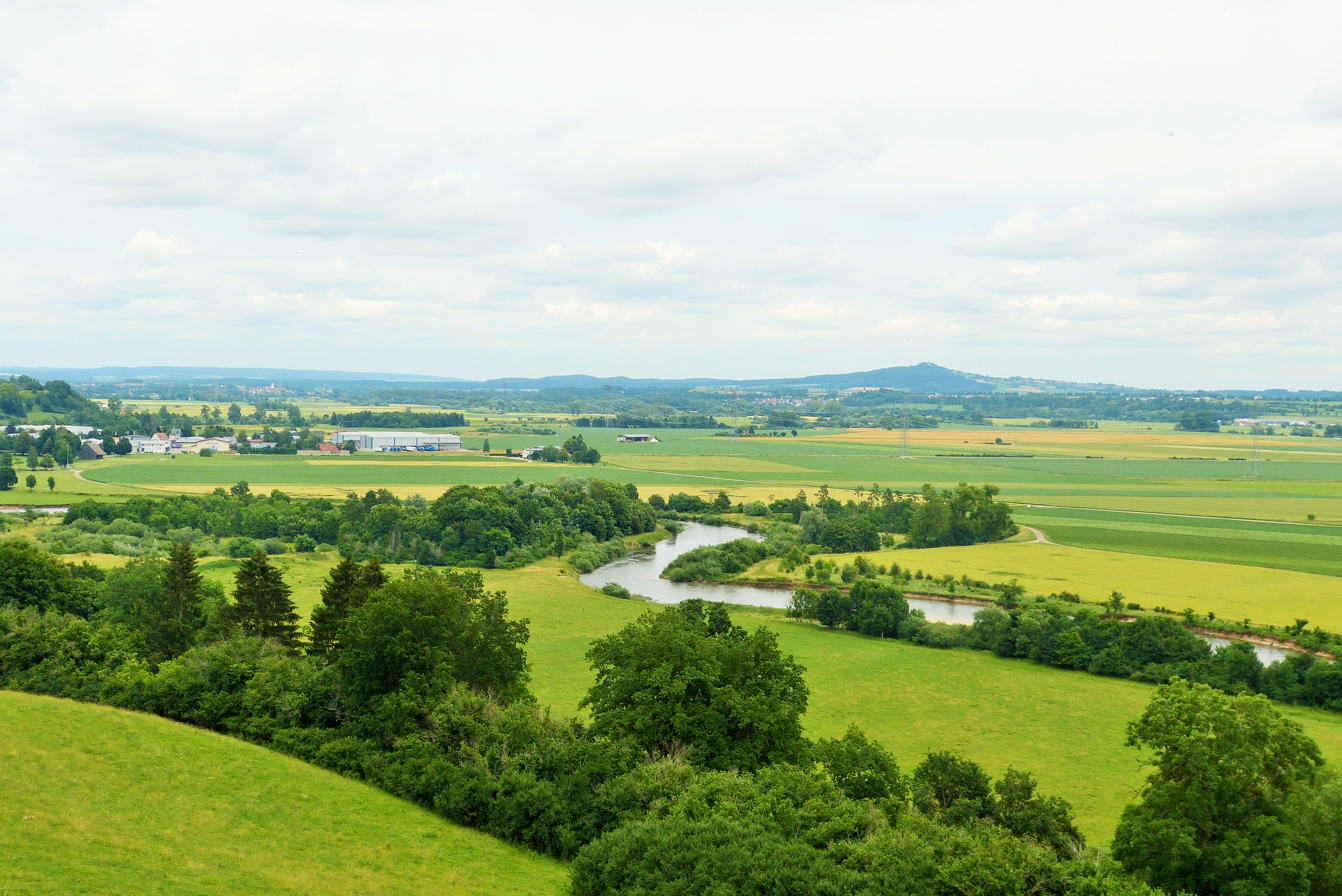
View from the Heuneburg

Several other hilltop sites came into existence in the broader region at the same time as the Heuneburg, about 700 BC. Initially, they may have been similar in size and population. Strikingly, most of them were abandoned around 600 BC, i.e. when the Heuneburg settlement was reorganised. It is possible that the Heuneburg had become so powerful as to attract population at the expense of other sites. It has long been suggested that the Hohenasperg settlement, some 100 km (62 mi) to the North of the Heuneburg, was somehow involved in the destruction of the Heuneburg after 500 BC and profited from its demise (see "abandonment" below). There is no clear evidence for such an interpretation, especially as the abandonment of the Heuneburg area is now in doubt (see below).

=== Destructions, abandonment, and continuity ===
The traditional view that the two main destructions of the citadel fortifications are the result of violent destruction, and that the Heuneburg was abandoned after the second destruction, which may have been part of a power struggle with Hohenasperg, have lost some ground recently. It remains likely that the mudbrick fortification was indeed destroyed violently, but there is no exact evidence to indicate whether this may have been the result of external warfare or of internal difficulties. The renewed economic flourish after this event may argue against a wholesale destruction of the site. The second destruction, in the 5th century, is even more problematic. It has been argued that the fire or fires could be accidental. It is also important to note that although the Heuneburg plateau is mostly abandoned at this time, as is the Aussensiedlung, smaller settlements develop in the surrounding area and burial activity continues, perhaps suggesting a change in the focus of settlement activity, possibly connected with sociopolitical changes at that time.

=== Climate ===
It has been proposed that the flourishing of Celtic cultures between the 7th and 5th centuries BC is connected with a warm phase that coincided with that period. A milder climate would have permitted more successful agriculture, which would, in turn, have allowed for larger populations, and thus for the development of more complex political, social and artisanal specialisations. The end of this mild period would have led to population losses and to a collapse of the established economic systems. The demise of centres like the Heuneburg, but also the 4th century Celtic migrations could be connected with such events.

=== Trade, contacts with the Classical World ===
The importance of the Heuneburg, like that of other contemporary centres, is closely connected with its location in relation to several important trade routes. Placed just north of the Alps and on the Danube, the site had access to important land routes across the mountains from Italy and Southern France (especially the Greek colony of Massalia), and, by river, to the Balkans and the Black Sea. It was involved in long-distance trade between northern and southern Europe, involving luxury goods (as found in the burial mounds) and probably wine from the south, and amber, metals, as well as probably perishables like leather and fur, from the north. The Mediterranean (Greek and/or Etruscan) influence on the Heuneburg is especially strongly reflected by its mudbrick fortification and the newly found ashlar masonry.

=== Pyrene ===
In the mid-5th century BC, the Greek historian Herodotus (Book 2.33) made a brief passing reference to a Celtic city called by the Greek "Pyrene": "For the Ister flows from the land of the Celts and the city of Pyrene through the very middle of Europe..." Since the Heuneburg is roughly in the right location and was a major regional centre just before that time, it is possible that it is the settlement referred to by that name.

== Museums ==
The Heuneburgmuseum is located in the renovated barn of the former monastery of Heiligkreuztal at Hundersingen. The exhibition explains the importance of the site and displays some of the original finds from the site and nearby burials.

In recent years, an open-air museum has been erected on the Heuneburg plateau itself. It includes reconstructions of several houses and of part of the mudbrick wall.

Some of the finds from the Hohmichele grave are partially on display in the Württemberg State Museum (Stuttgart).

== See also ==
- Glauberg
- Vix Grave and Mont Lassois
- Hohenasperg
- Hochdorf Chieftain's Grave
- Ipf
- Burgstallkogel
- Alte Burg
- Große Heuneburg (Upflamör)
- Bettelbühl burial ground
- Grafenbühl grave
- Grave of Ditzingen-Schöckingen
- Grächwil
- Oppidum of Manching

== Bibliography ==
=== Further reading (a selection) ===
- Jörg Bofinger: Archäologische Untersuchungen in der Vorburg der Heuneburg - Siedlung und Befestigungssysteme am frühkeltischen Fürstensitz an der oberen Donau, Gde. Herbertingen-Hundersingen, Kreis Sigmaringen. In: Archäologische Ausgrabungen in Baden-Württemberg 2004. P. 82–86. Theiss, Stuttgart 2005. ISBN 3-8062-1957-5
- Jörg Bofinger: Stein für Stein ... Überraschende Befunde im Bereich der Befestigungssysteme der Heuneburg-Vorburg, Gde. Herbertingen-Hundersingen, Kreis Sigmaringen. In: Archäologische Ausgrabungen in Baden-Württemberg 2005. P. 73–78. Theiss, Stuttgart 2006. ISBN 3-8062-2019-0
- Egon Gersbach: Die mittelbronzezeitlichen Wehranlagen der Heuneburg bei Hundersingen a.D. In: Arch. Korrespondenzblatt. 1973, 3, P. 417–422.
- Wolfgang Kimmig: Die Heuneburg an der oberen Donau. Führer arch. Denkm. Bad.-Württ. Stuttgart, Theiss 1983.
- Dirk Krausse, Manuel Fernández-Götz, Leif Hansen, Inga Kretschmer, The Heuneburg and the Early Iron Age Princely Seats: First Towns North of the Alps. Budapest, Archeolingua 2016.
- Manuel Fernández-Götz, Dirk Krausse, Rethinking Early Iron Age Urbanisation in Central Europe: The Heuneburg Site and its Archaeological Environment. Antiquity 87(336), 2013, P. 473-487.
- Siegfried Kurz: Die Heuneburg-Außensiedlung (Forschungen und Berichte zur Vor- und Frühgeschichte in Baden-Württemberg vol. 72), Stuttgart 2000
- Siegfried Kurz, Siegwalt Schiek: Bestattungsplätze im Umfeld der Heuneburg. (Forschungen und Berichte zur Vor- und Frühgeschichte in Baden-Württemberg vol. 87), Stuttgart 2002
- Siegfried Kurz: Die Heuneburg bei Herbertingen-Hundersingen, Kreis Sigmaringen, und ihr Umland. Zum Abschluss des DFG-Projektes. In: Archäologische Ausgrabungen in Baden-Württemberg 2003. P. 62–65. Theiss, Stuttgart 2004. ISBN 3-8062-1876-5

=== Heuneburg studies ===
The excavations have led to the publication of a series of specialised monographs on the Heuneburg. 11 volumes have been published so far:

- Gustav Riek: Der Hohmichele. Ein Fürstengrabhügel der späten Hallstattzeit. Heuneburgstudien 1, Röm.-German. Forsch. 26, Berlin 1962
- Günter Mansfeld: Die Fibeln der Heuneburg 1950-1970. Heuneburgstudien 2, Röm.-German. Forsch. 33, Berlin 1973
- Amei Lang: Die geriefte Drehscheibenkeramik der Heuneburg 1950-1970 und verwandte Gruppen. Heuneburgstudien 3, Röm.-German. Forsch. 34, Berlin 1974
- Heinz-Werner Dämmer: Die bemalte Keramik der Heuneburg. Heuneburgstudien 4, Röm.-German. Forsch. 37, Mainz 1978
- Susanne Sievers: Die Kleinfunde der Heuneburg. Heuneburgstudien 5, Römisch-Germanische Forschungen 42 Mainz, 1984
- Egon Gersbach: Ausgrabungsmethodik und Stratigraphie der Heuneburg. Heuneburgstudien 6, Röm.-German. Forsch. 45, Mainz 1988
- Daniela Fort-Linksfeiler: Die Schüsseln und Schalen der Heuneburg. Heuneburgstudien 7, Röm.-German. Forsch. 47, Mainz 1989
- Helga van den Boom: Großgefäße und Töpfe der Heuneburg. Heuneburgstudien 8, Röm.-German. Forsch.51, Mainz 1991
- Egon Gersbach: Baubefunde der Perioden IVc - IVa der Heuneburg. Heuneburgstudien 9, Röm.-German. Forsch. 53, Mainz 1995
- Egon Gersbach: Baubefunde der Perioden IIIb - Ia der Heuneburg. Heuneburgstudien 10, Röm.-German. Forsch. 56, Mainz 1996
- Wolfgang Kimmig (Hrsg.): Importe und mediterrane Einflüsse auf der Heuneburg. Heuneburgstudien 11, Röm.-German. Forsch. 59, Mainz 2000
