= Vorstengraf (Oss) =

Burial mound in the Netherlands

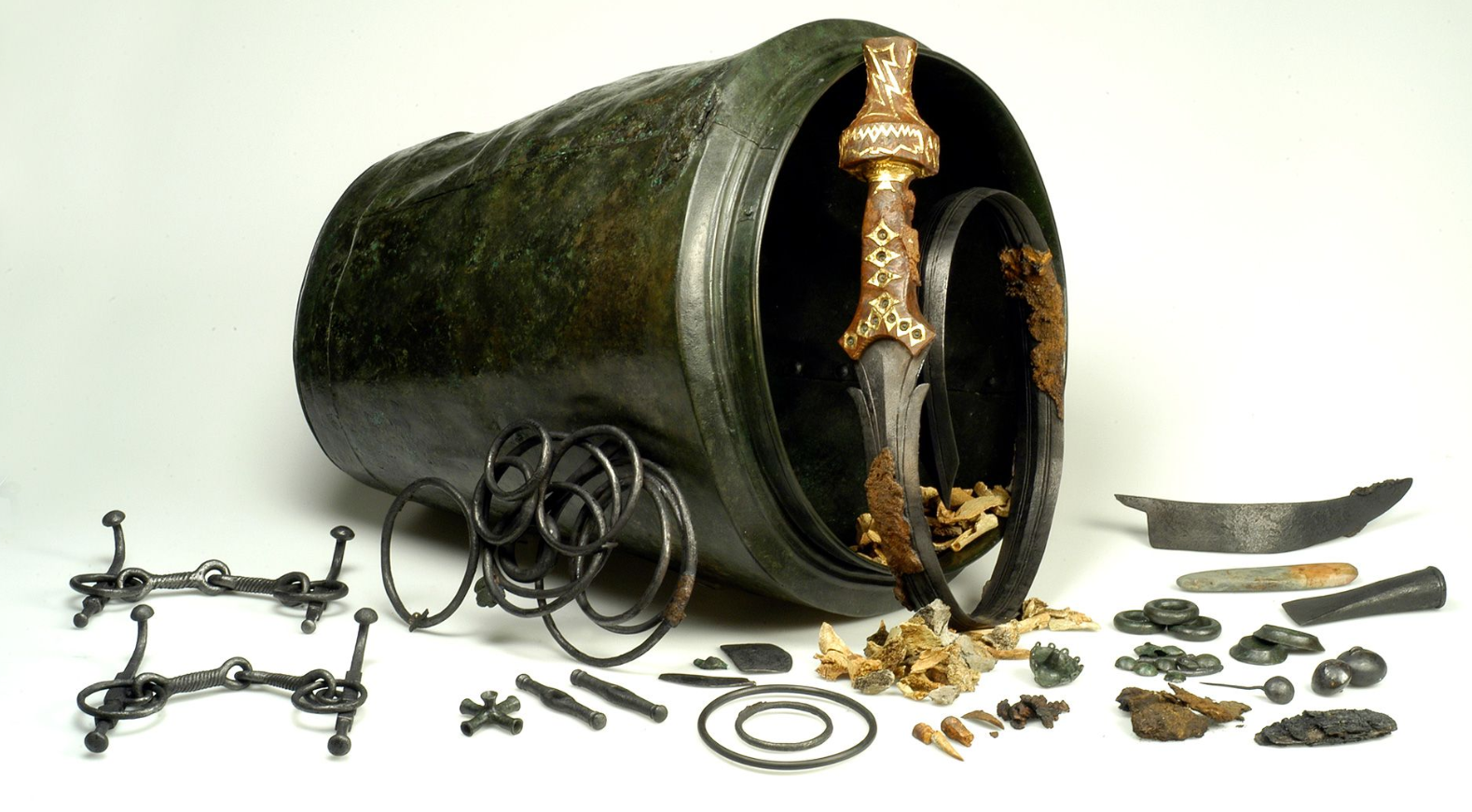
Finds from the Vorstengraf

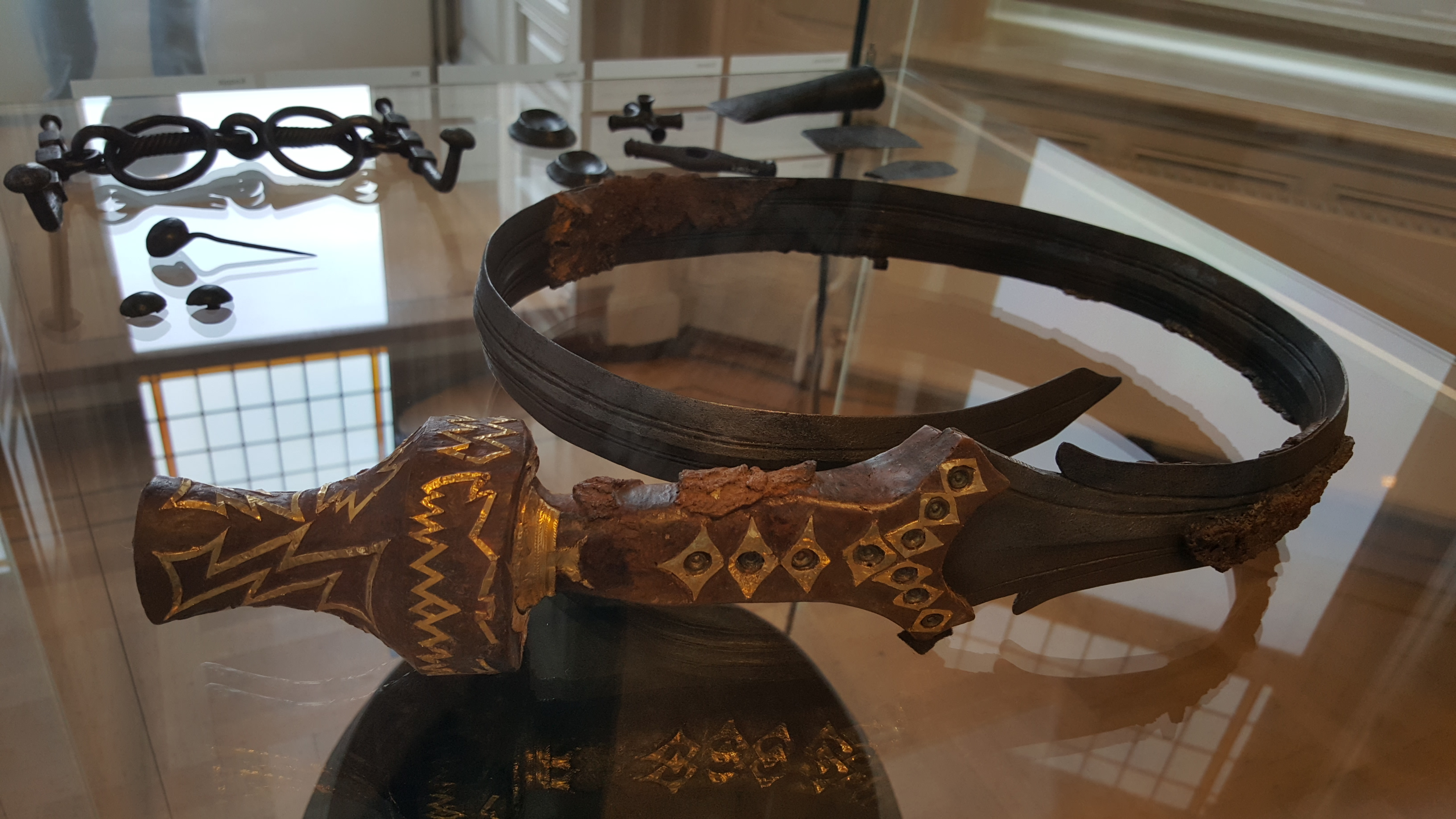
The original curved iron sword, Rijksmuseum van Oudheden

The Vorstengraf (grave of the king) in Oss is one of the largest burial mounds in the Netherlands and Belgium. The hill was 3 metres high and had a diameter of 54 metres.

== First, second and third Vorstengraf ==
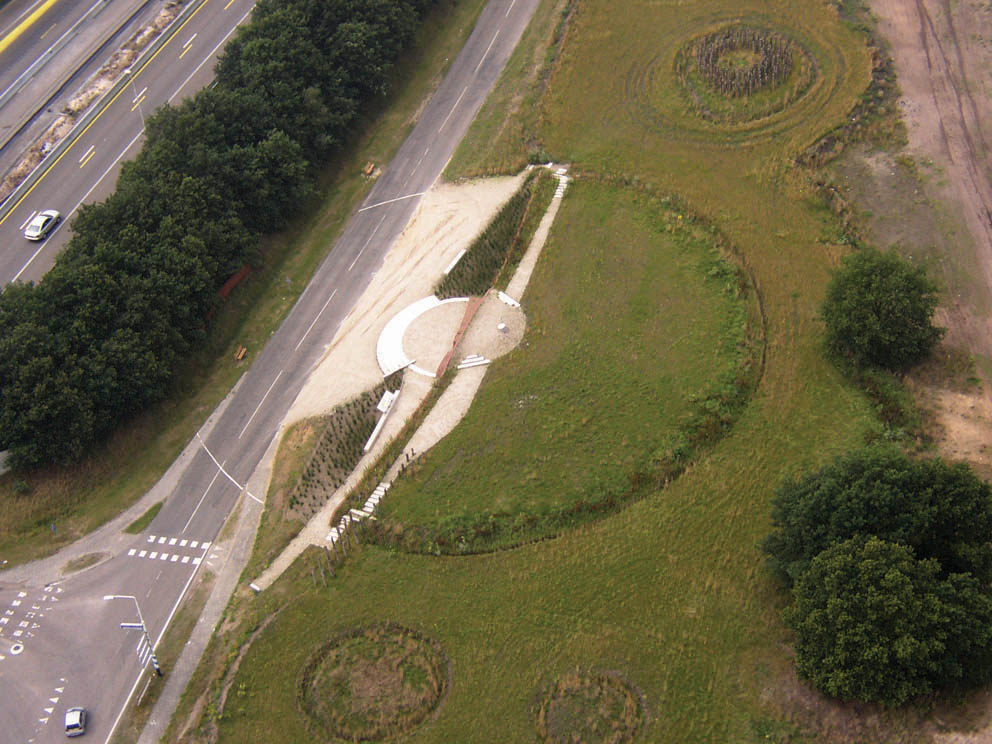
The Vorstengraf from above

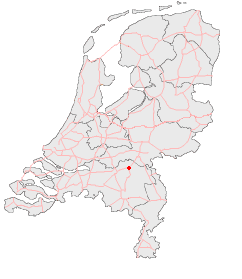
The location of interchange Paalgraven

In 1933, the so-called Vorstengraf was uncovered during the construction of a trailer park on the heath. It contained a bronze cauldron containing a curved iron sword from 700 BC. The find was transferred to the Rijksmuseum van Oudheden in Leiden. The site of the hill was later a junkyard. The mound is now partly restored, a portion of the circumference of the hill is marked with poles.

In 2009, a second Vorstengraf was discovered a few hundred metres from the first Vorstengraf. The finds from this tomb are displayed in the Jan Cunen Museum in Oss. In 2011, it was announced that a third Vorstengraf was discovered in Uden.

== Pile graves ==
The Vorstengraf is located at the interchange Paalgraven. This node is named after the pile graves that have been found in the immediate vicinity. These tombs were built in the period of the Early Bronze Age to the Early Iron Age (Hallstatt culture), between 2000 BC to 700 BC.

To the east of Oss a new highway was built to connect the A50 and A59 from Emmeloord to 's-Hertogenbosch (formerly the junction with the N265 Eindhoven-Oss).

In the vicinity of the tomb two Forest Hills Tree Wreaths were excavated. According to archaeologists the poles probably had a ritual function. One of the hills is surrounded by a ditch.

To the east and south of the Vorstengraf an urnfield was found dating back to the Late Bronze Age and Early Iron Age. Cremated remains are interred in an urn or cloth. Soon after the establishment of the Vorstengraf the burial ground was closed.

== Seven Mounds ==
The area De Zevenbergen - Seven Mounds - was examined in 1964 and 1965 and seven burial mounds were found. When the junction was later modified the area had another investigation. Trial slots revealed that there had been a line of poles over a length of at least 100 meter in the area. In 2004 began the actual excavation of the multiple burial hills.

In the 13th century a gallows was built on one of these hills. This was at a crossroads of continuous ruts on the heath and the remains of two victims were found nearby.

== Myths ==
There are folk tales associated with the mound, local historian Jan Cunen (1884–1940) once recorded that a prince must have been buried in the heath.

The hill is also called Hansjoppenmountain. There are several stories about the Gnome Hans Joppen.

== Gallery ==
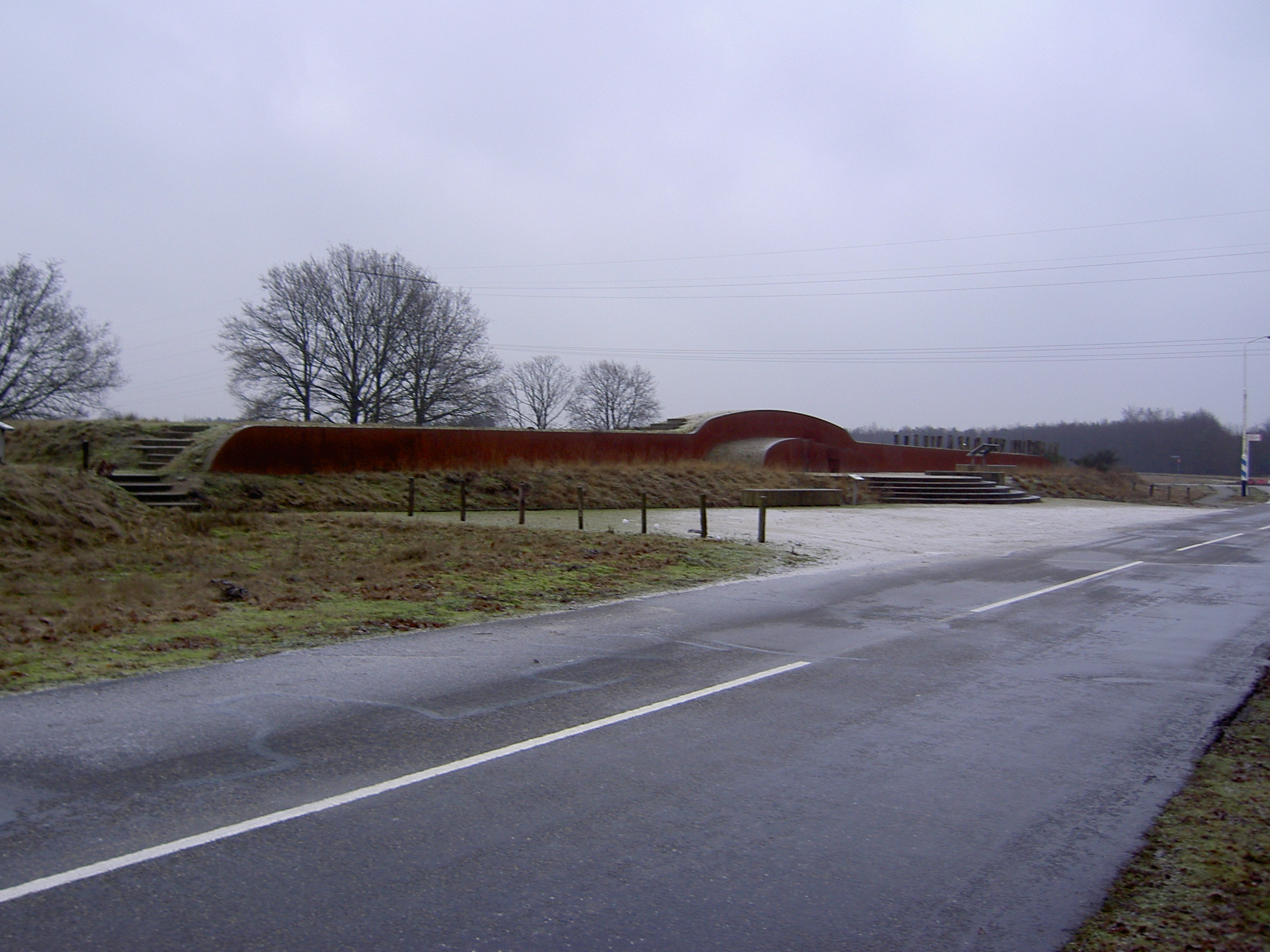
Vorstengraf Oss

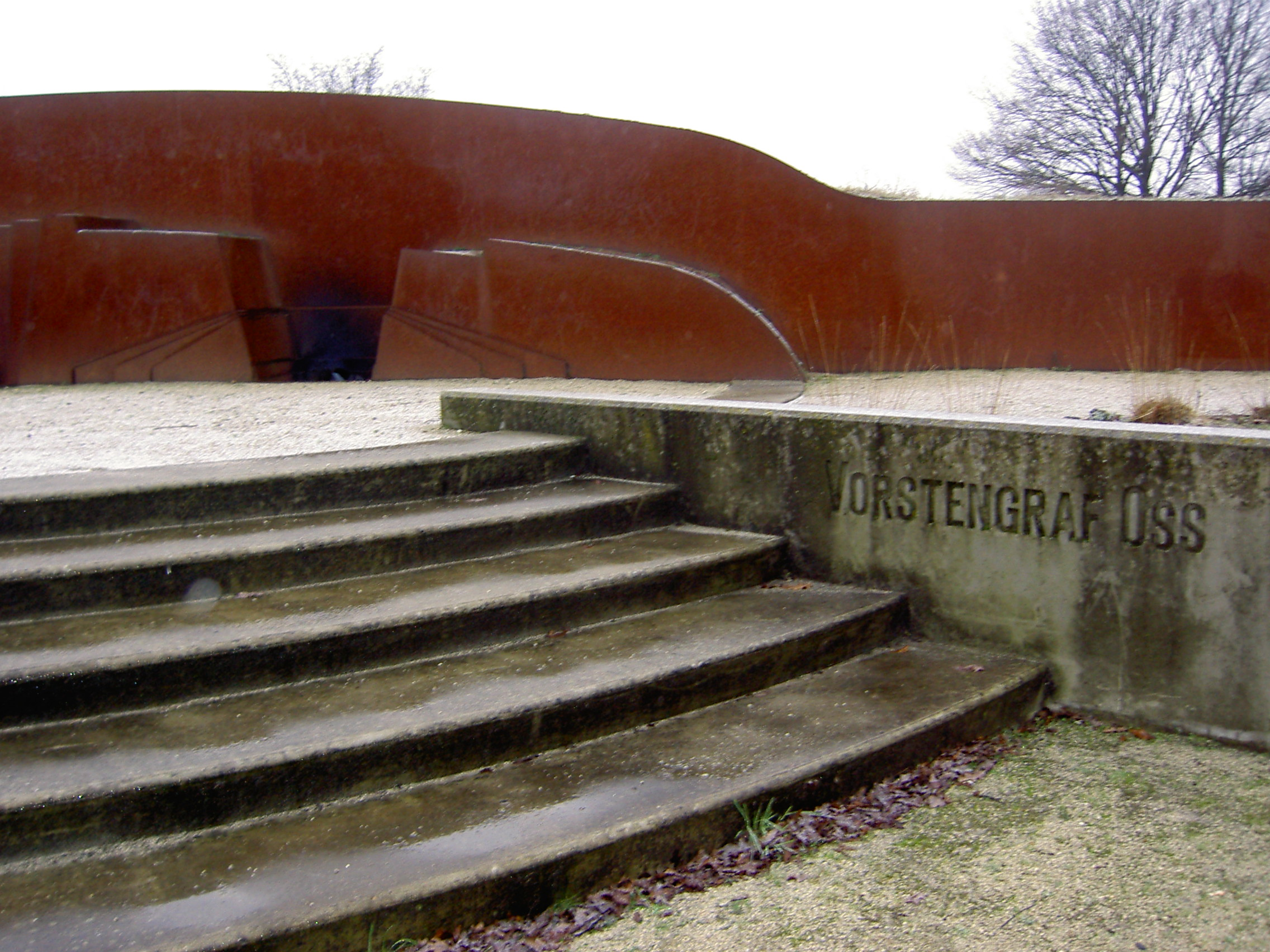
Vorstengraf Oss

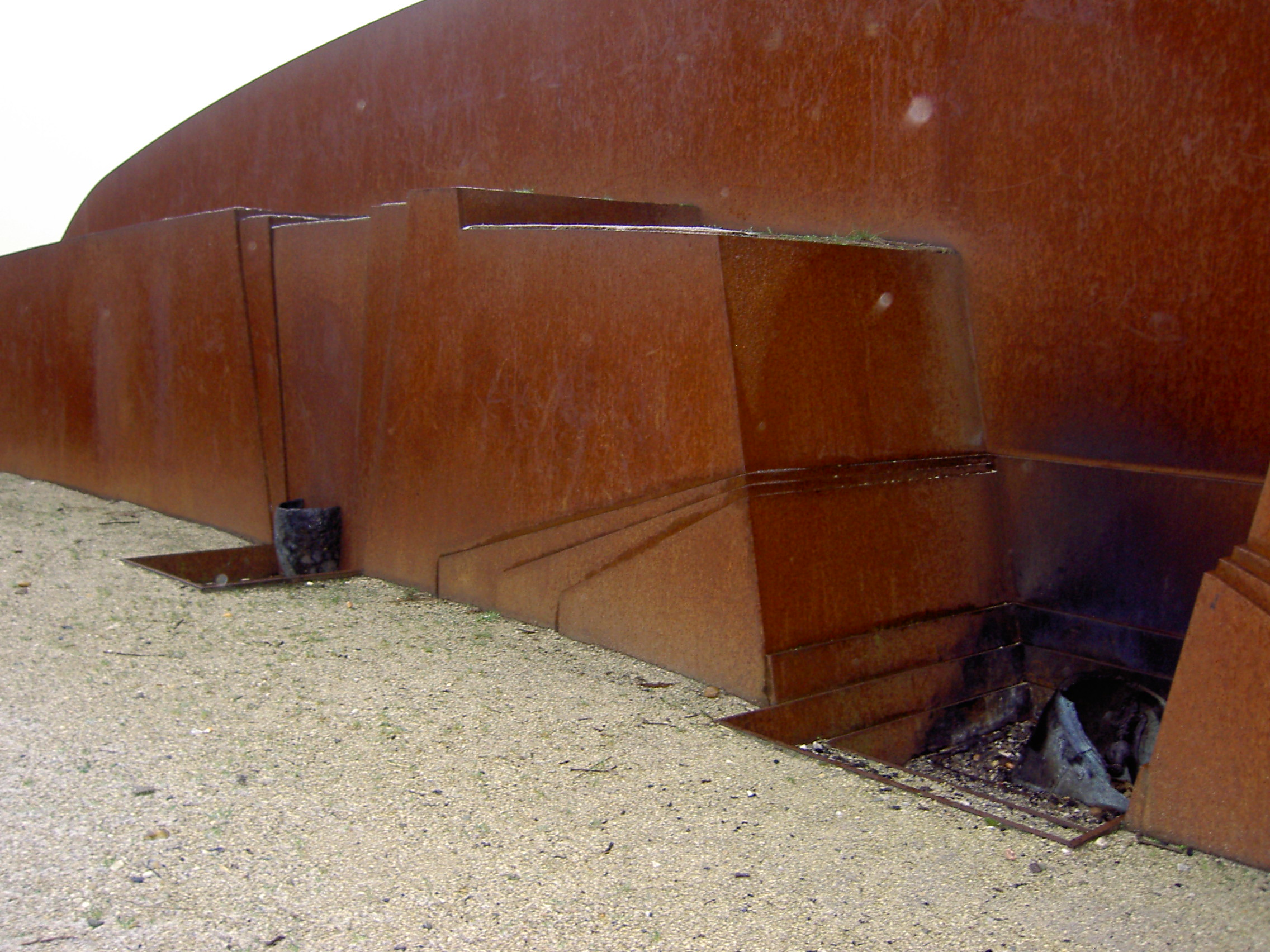
The Vorstengraf with replicas of the finds

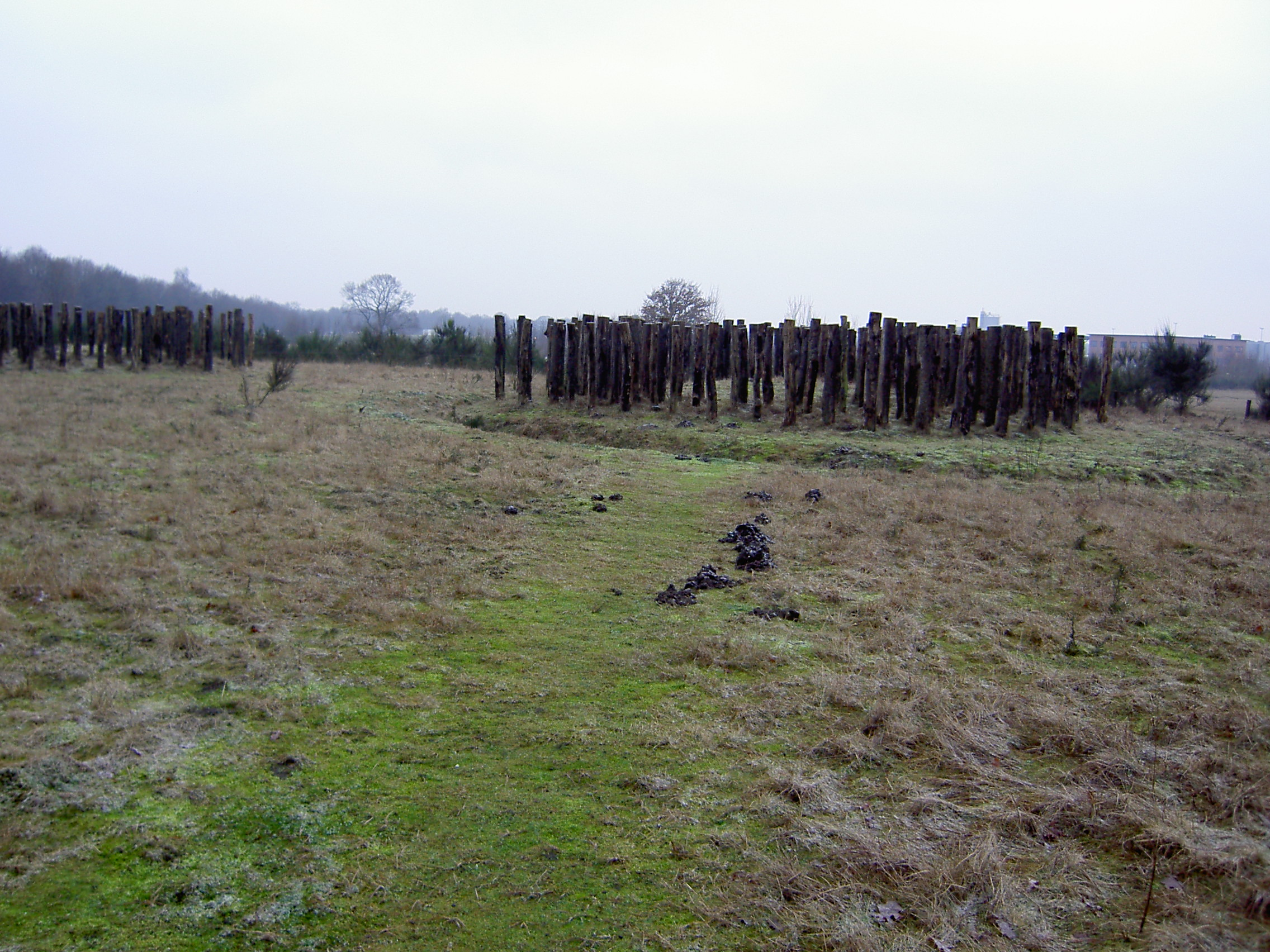

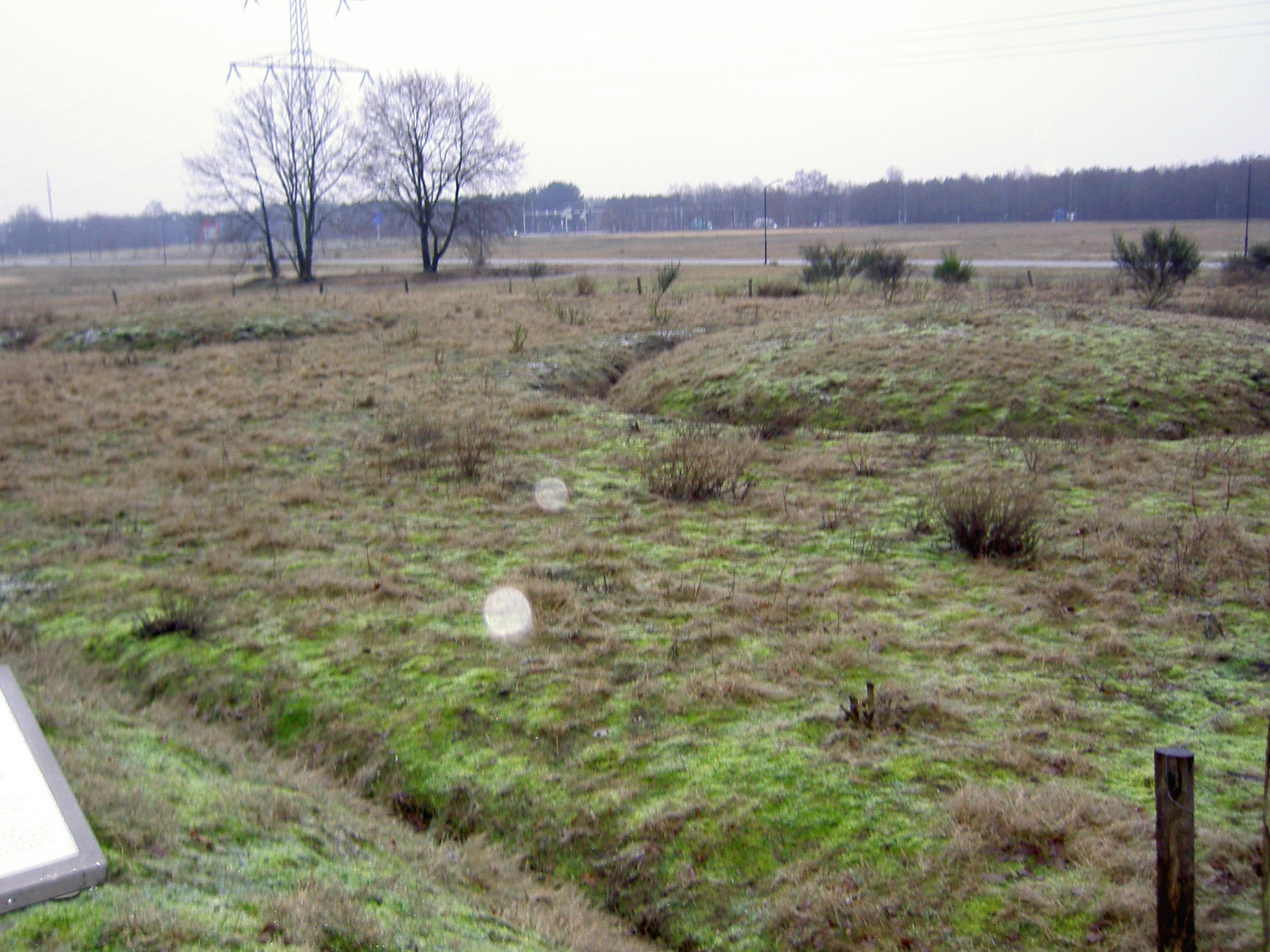

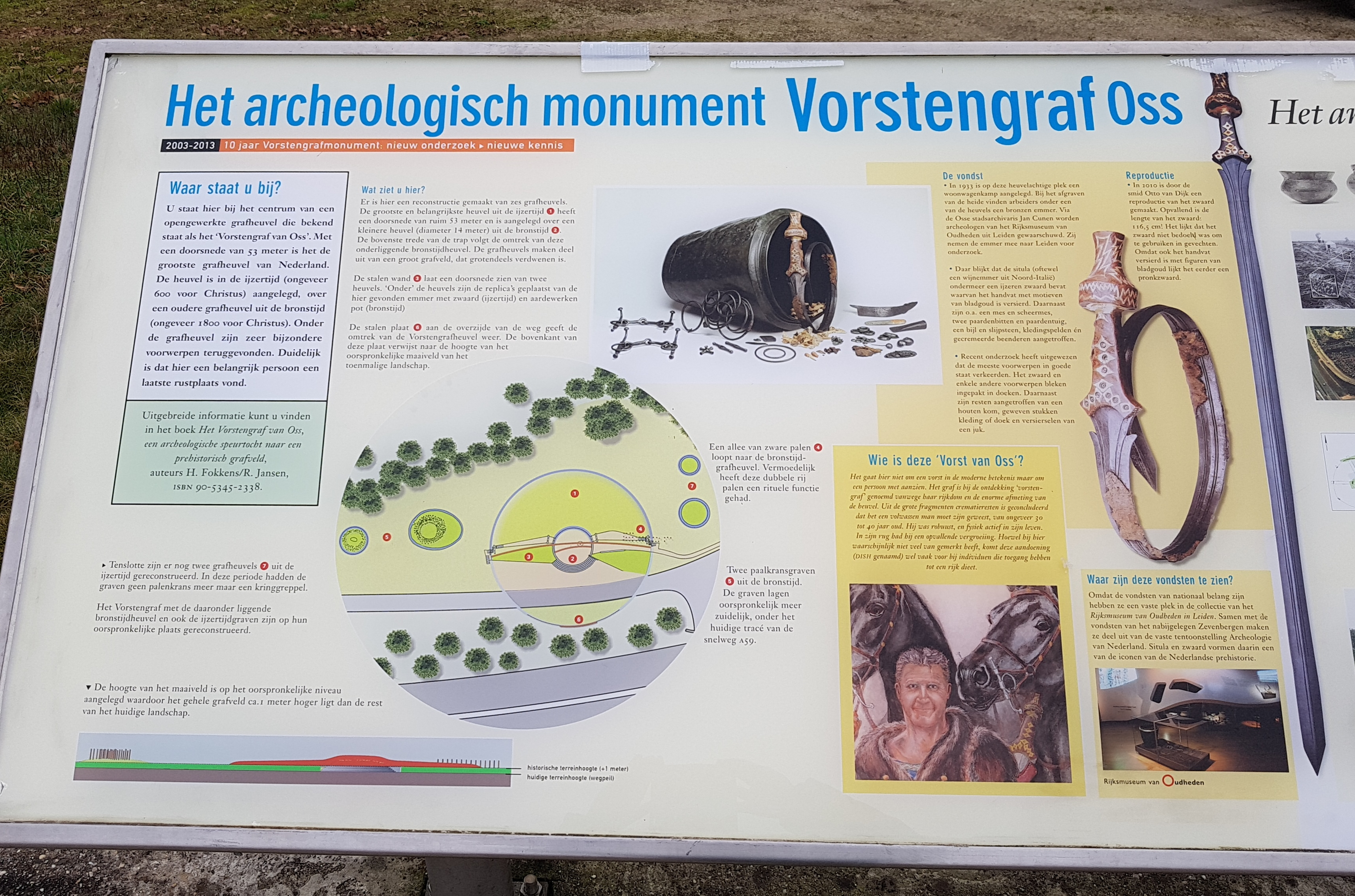
Information board

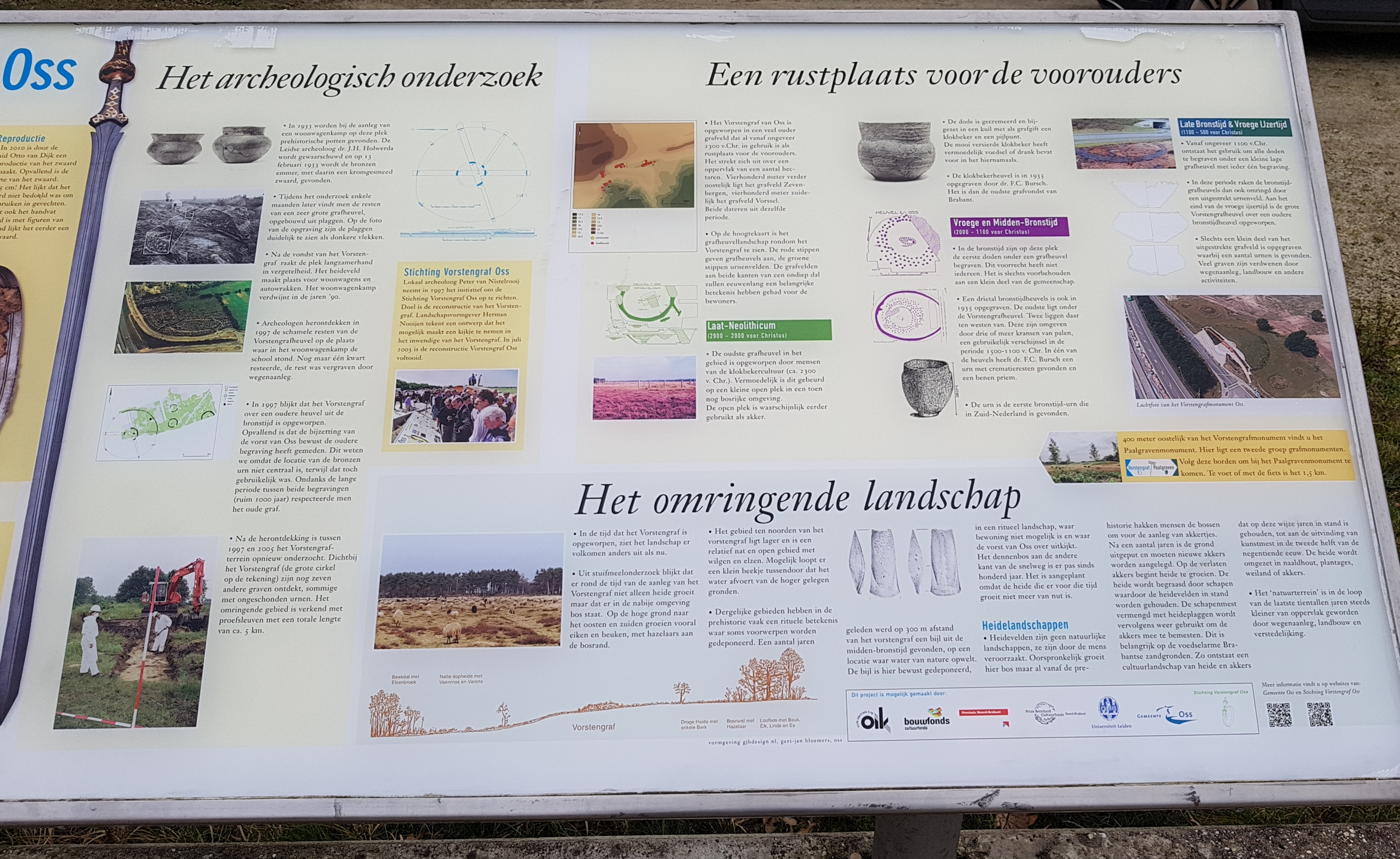

== See also ==
- Vix Grave
- Hochdorf Chieftain's Grave
- Graves of Sainte-Colombe-sur-Seine
- Lavau Grave
- Heuneburg
- Glauberg
- Hohenasperg
- Ipf (mountain)
- Burgstallkogel
- Alte Burg
- Grächwil
- Grafenbühl grave
- Reinheim grave
- Princely Grave of Rodenbach
