= Graves of Sainte-Colombe-sur-Seine =

Several burial mounds in Côte-d'Or, France

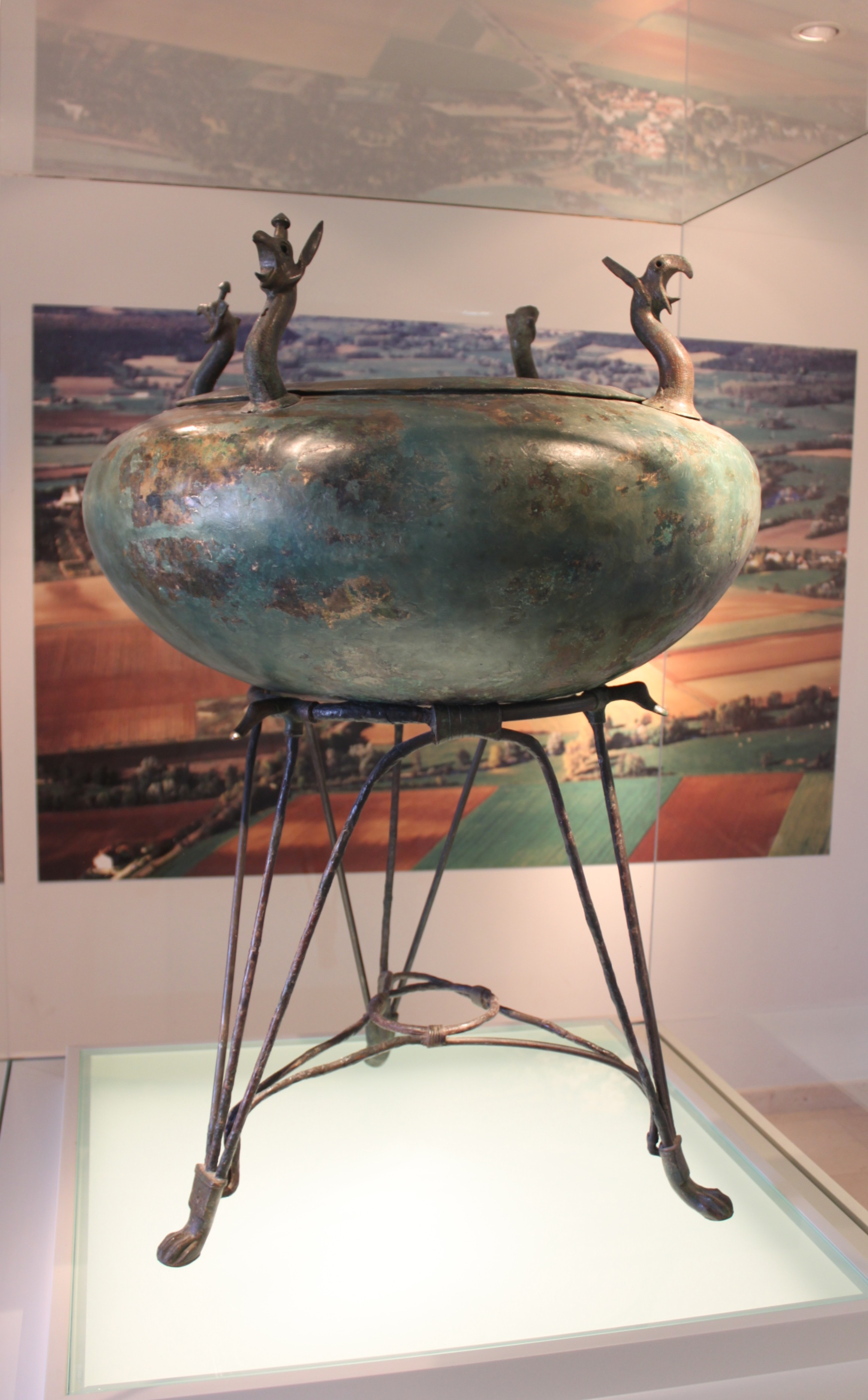
Etruscan bronze lebes (cauldron) from La Garenne

The Graves of Sainte-Colombe-sur-Seine are several burial mounds dating from the 6th century BC, located near the town of Sainte-Colombe-sur-Seine in the Côte-d'Or department in eastern France.

== Description ==
The burials are associated with the Iron Age Hallstatt culture. In the 19th century they were excavated at the request of Napoleon III, revealing elite wagon burials containing gold jewellery and prestigious imported artefacts. The first to be excavated, located at La Garenne, provided a magnificent bronze lebes of Etruscan origin, which is now displayed in the Musée du Pays Châtillonnais in Châtillon-sur-Seine. In another, at La Butte, gold bracelets and earrings were discovered in the grave of a woman who had been laid to rest on a luxurious iron-clad funerary wagon. These gold items are now kept at the National Archeological Museum in Saint-Germain-en-Laye.

In the middle of the 20th century René Joffroy (1958) postulated that the elites buried under the tumuli of La Butte and La Garenne had Mont Lassois as their place of residence. However, geomagnetic surveys carried out in 2015 revealed the presence of several large buildings in the vicinity of the Sainte-Colombe burial mounds, apparently belonging to a single architectural complex, suggesting that elites may have also lived nearby.

== Gallery ==
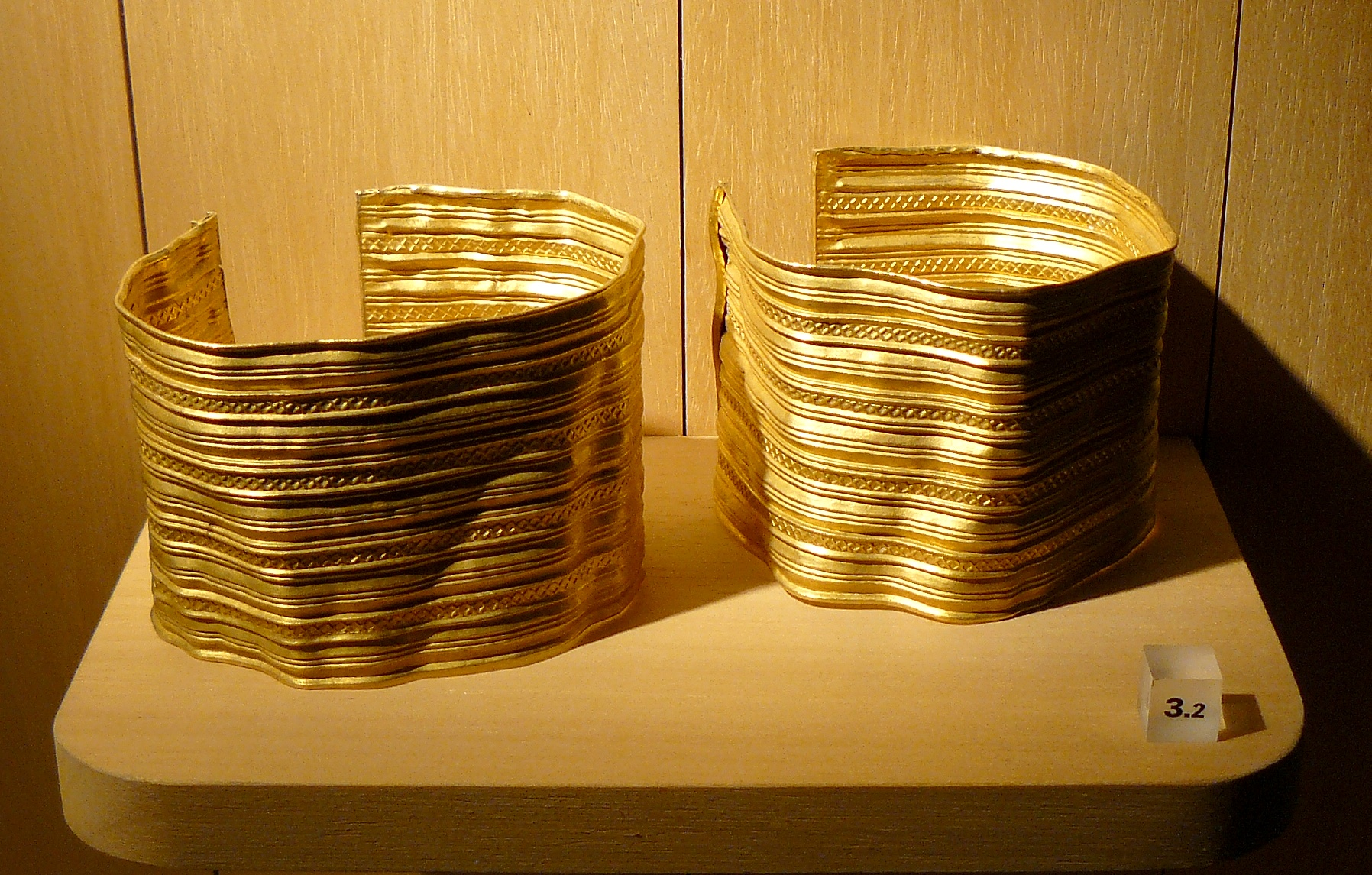
Gold bracelets, 6th century BC

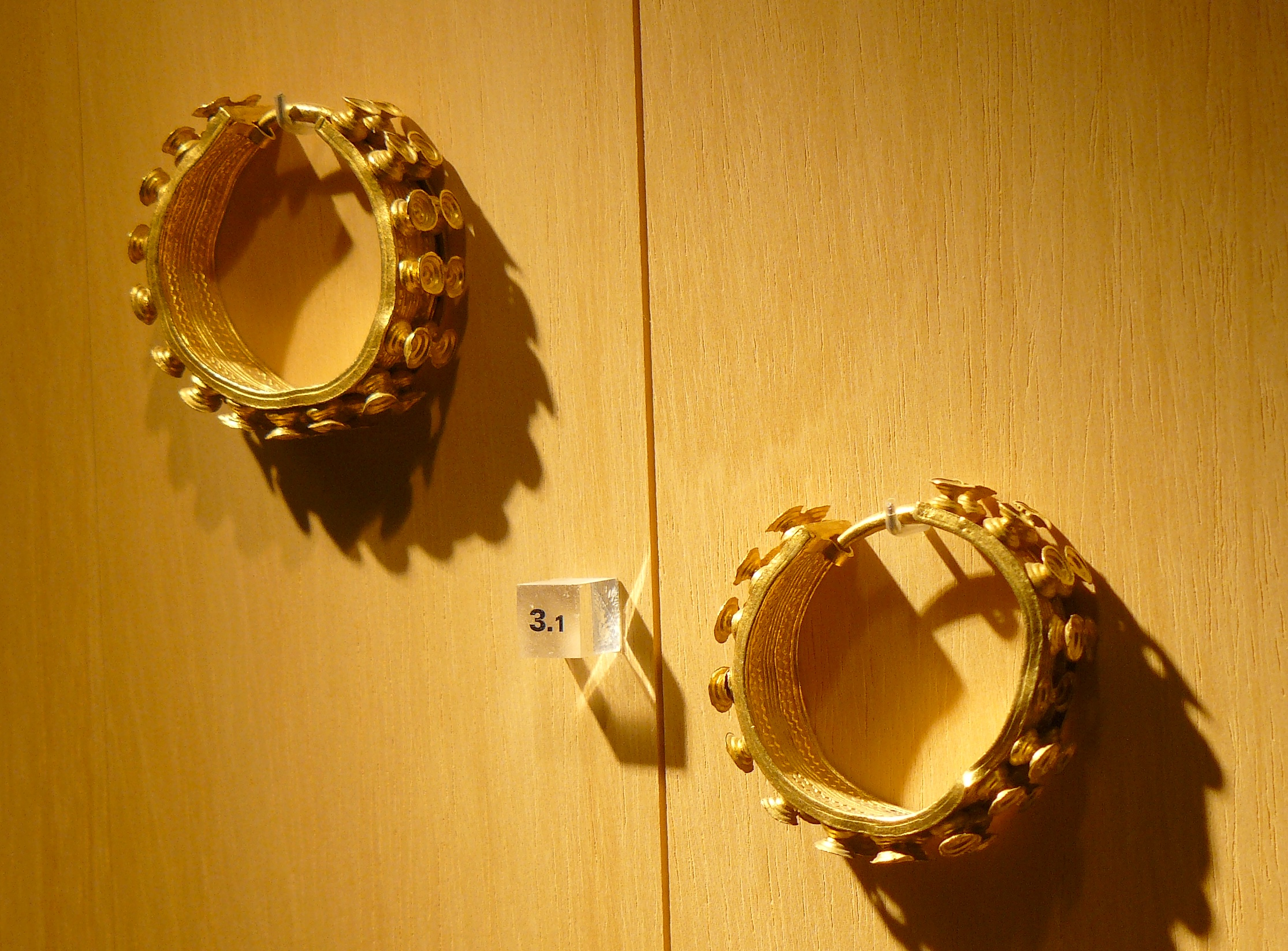
Gold earrings, 6th century BC

== See also ==
- Prehistory of France
- Vix Grave
- Hochdorf Chieftain's Grave
- Lavau Grave
- Heuneburg
- Glauberg
- Hohenasperg
- Ipf
- Burgstallkogel
- Grafenbühl grave
- Grächwil
