= Lavau Grave =

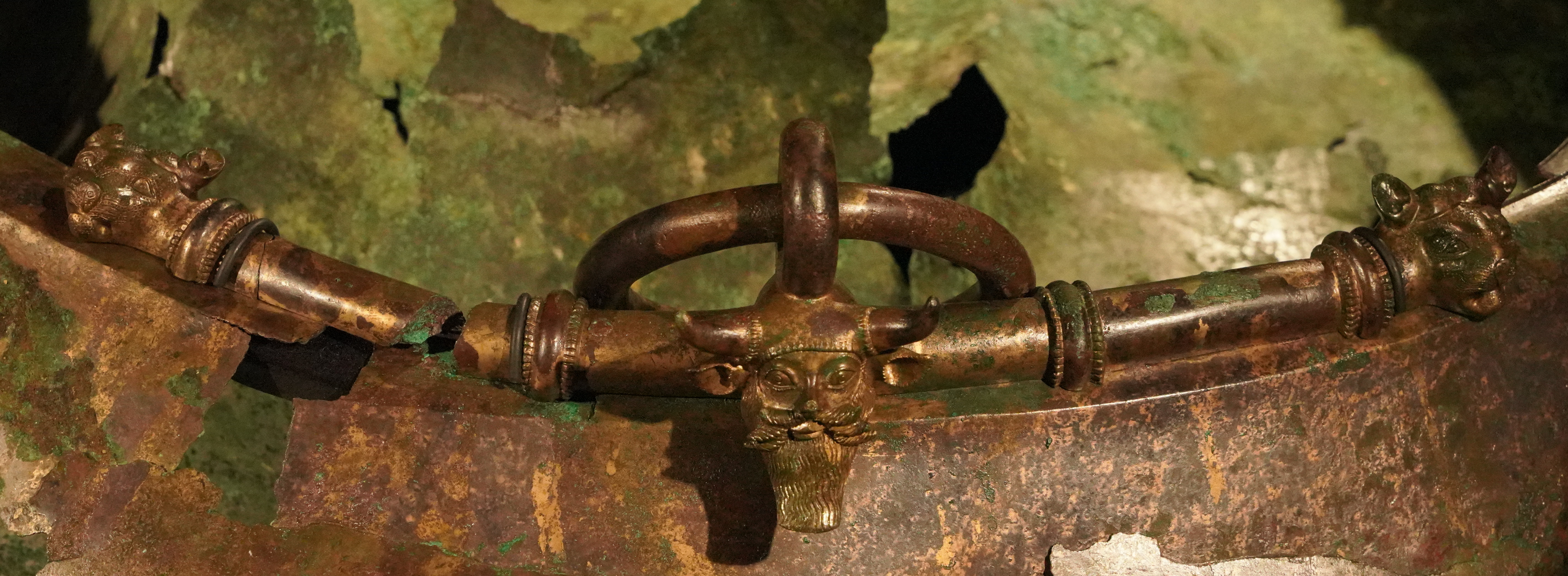
ornate bronze cauldron

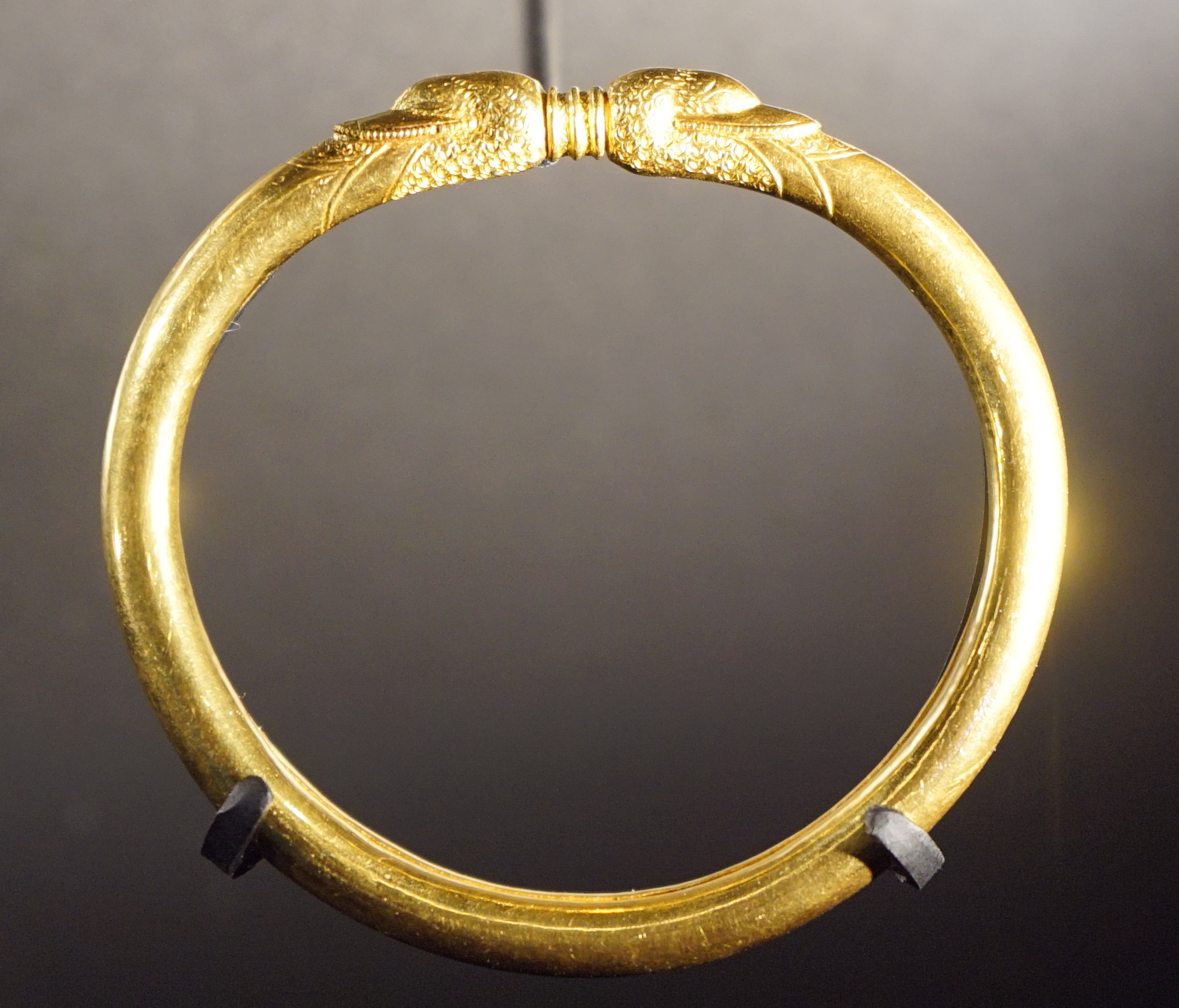
Lavau gold bracelet, Hallstatt D3

The Lavau Grave is princely burial dating to the middle of the 5th century BC, located by the town of Lavau in the Aube department of north-central France.

The grave was discovered in 2014. Excavations revealed a chariot burial containing a single male aged over 30, buried with exceptional gold treasures and imported artefacts including an ornate bronze cauldron of Greek or Etruscan origin and fine Greek painted pottery. Other items include a belt decorated with silver threads, an ornate belt clasp made from iron and coral, and an amber necklace. The burial was placed within a large chamber built from oak and covered with a huge tumulus 40 metres in diameter and 6 metres high. It formed the main part of a larger funerary monument containing burials dating back to the Late Bronze Age Urnfield culture. The whole ensemble was surrounded by rectangular ditches up to 3.5 metres deep and 6-7 metres wide, the corners of which were aligned with the cardinal directions. The findings indicate that the buried individual, dubbed the 'Prince of Lavau', belonged to the highest levels of society.

The Lavau grave contained artefacts dating from the Hallstatt D3 period, but later items place the burial itself in the early La Tène A1 period.

An associated elite residence or 'princely seat' similar to Mont Lassois has not yet been identified, but researchers suggest it may have been located on a nearby elevated site, or more likely at the current location of the city of Troyes. Other elite burials and potentitally fortified sites have been discovered in the surrounding area, distributed at regular intervals across the landscape. This suggests an organized "sharing of territorial control" by regional aristocratic elites.

== Gallery ==
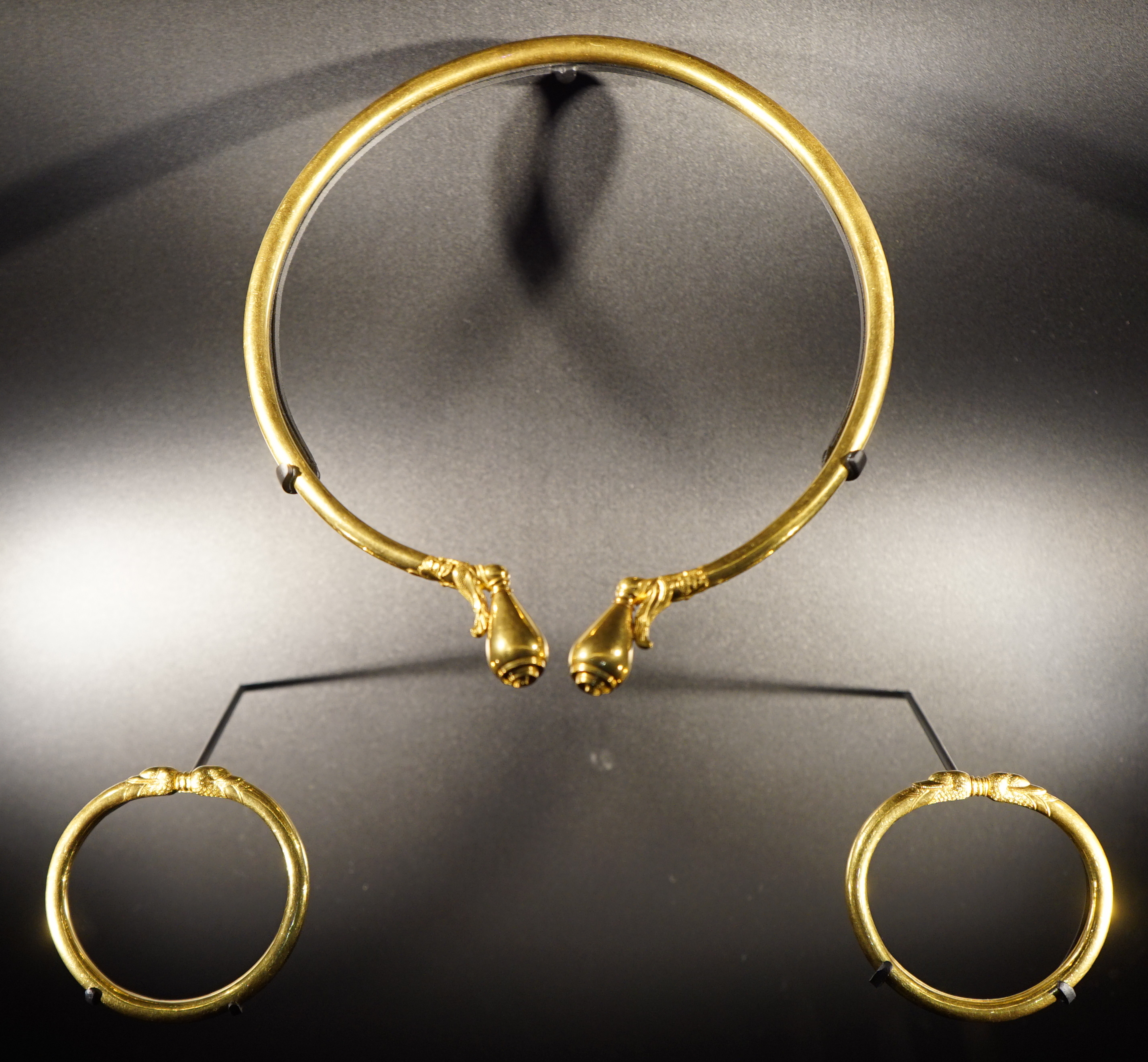
Gold torc and bracelets

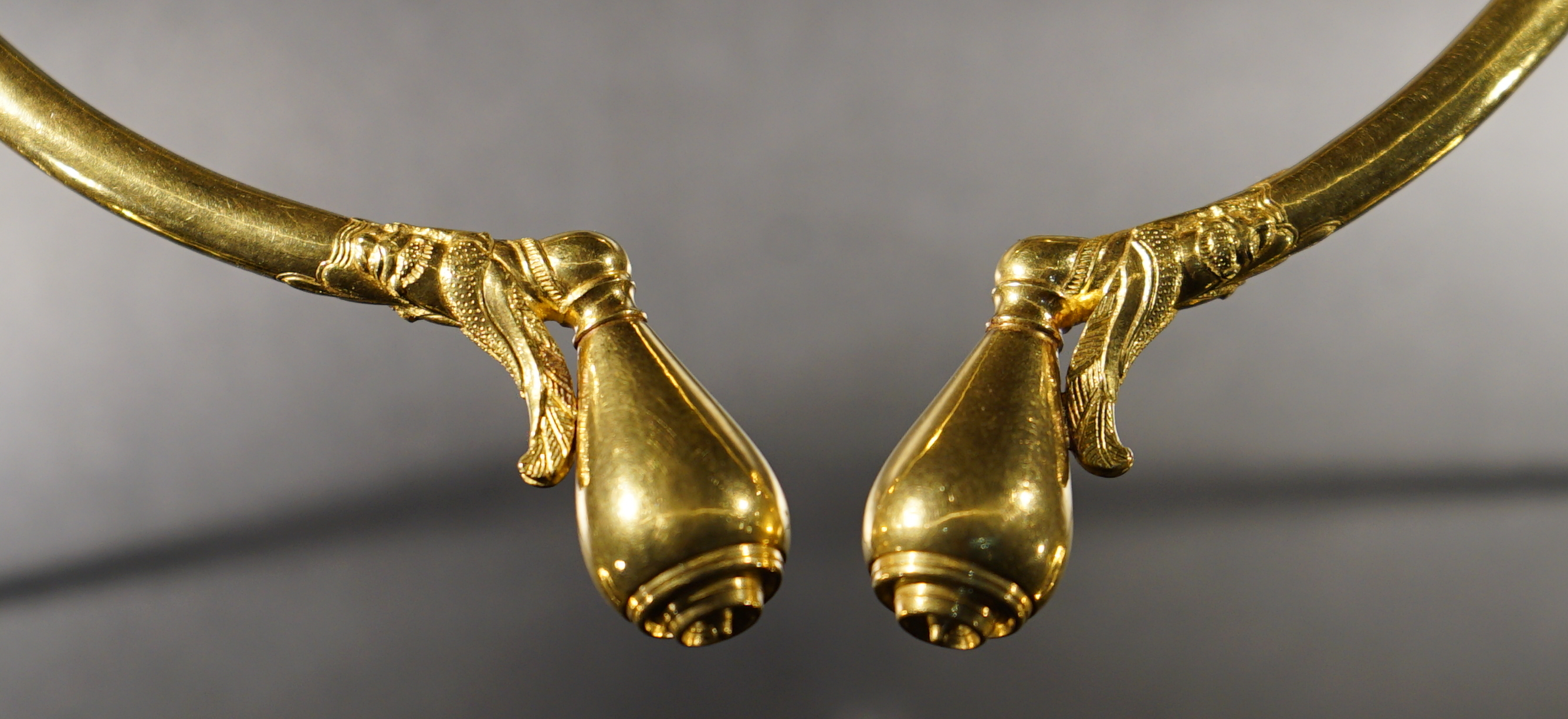
Gold torc, detail

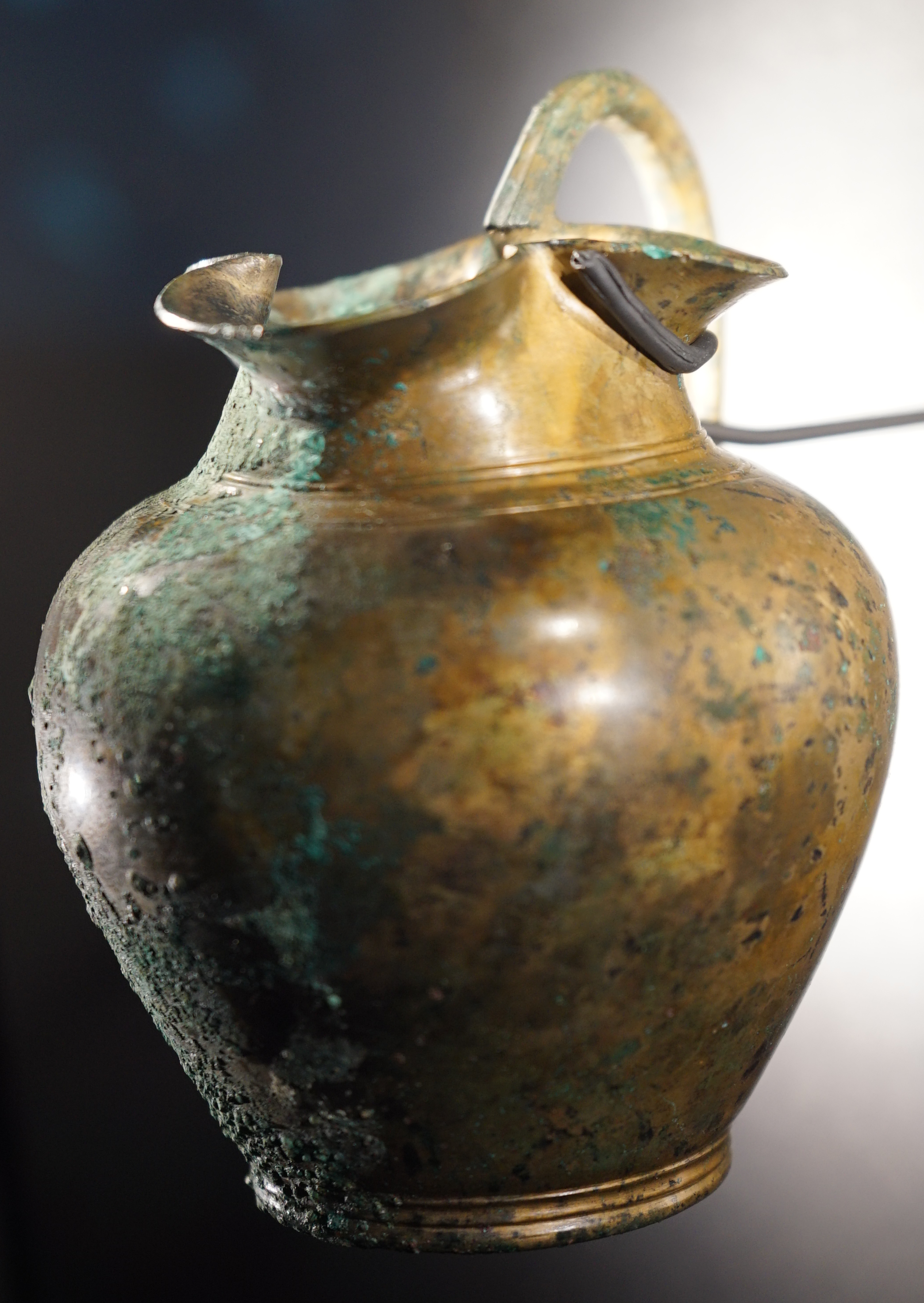
Bronze flagon

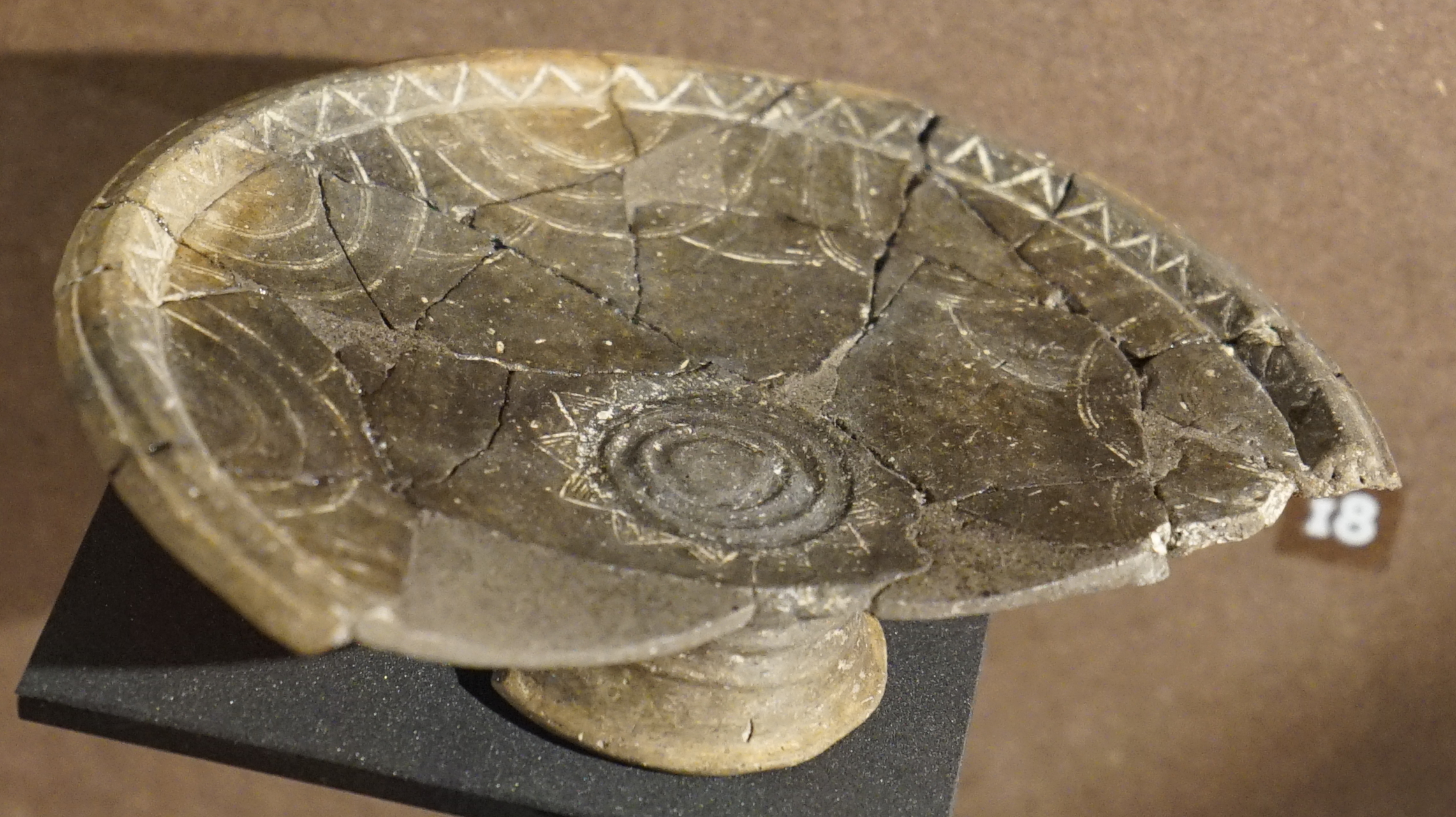
Urnfield culture ceramic

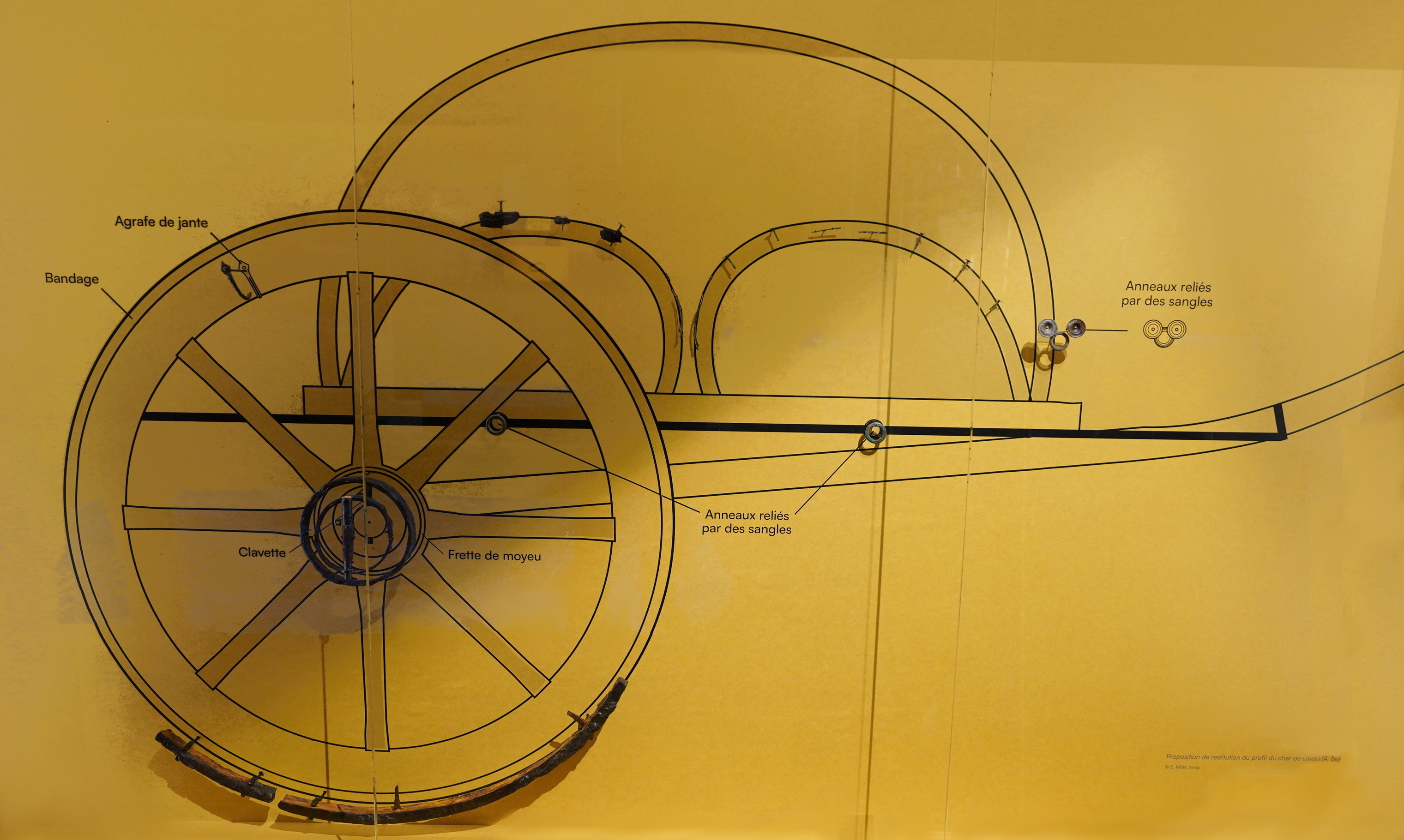
Reconstructed chariot from the Lavau grave

Knife

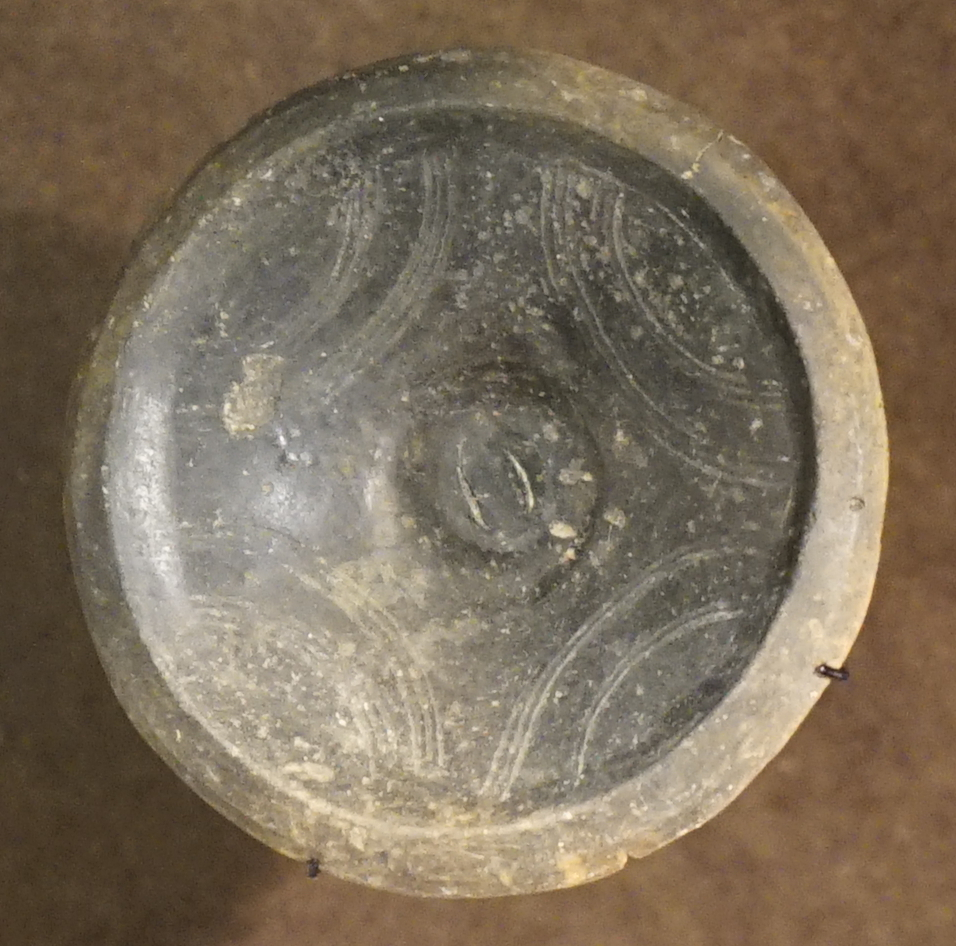
Ceramic dish

== See also ==
- Complexe funéraire du Moutot à Lavau
- Vix Grave
- Hochdorf Chieftain's Grave
- Graves of Sainte-Colombe-sur-Seine
- Heuneburg
- Glauberg
- Hohenasperg
- Ipf (mountain)
- Burgstallkogel
- Grafenbühl grave
- Grächwil
