= Ipf (mountain) =

Mountain near Bopfingen, Germany

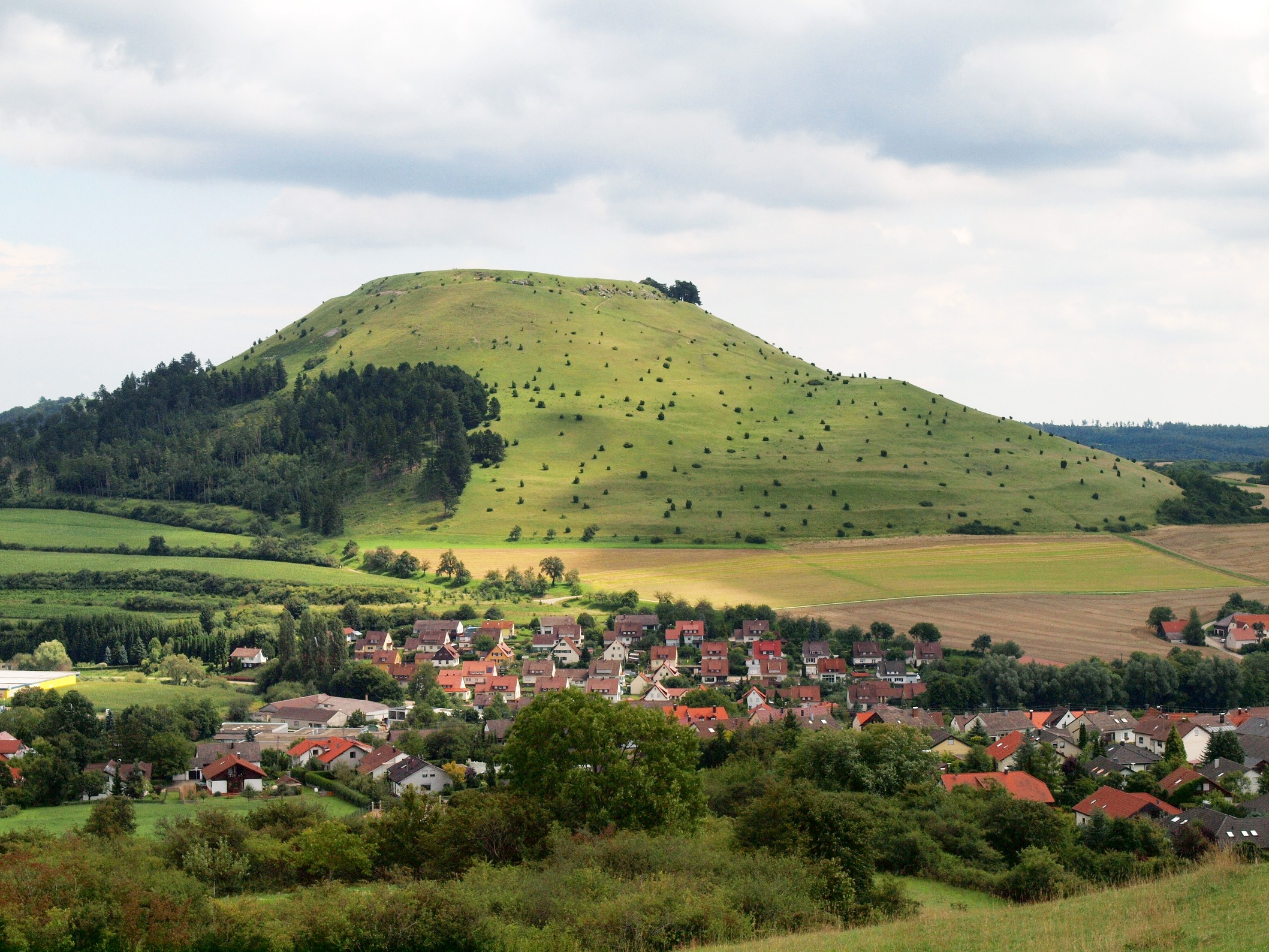
- Ipf

Highest point
- Elevation: 668 m (2,192 ft)
- Coordinates: 48°52′14″N 10°21′23″E

Geography
- Location within Baden-Württemberg
- Location: Baden-Württemberg, Germany
- Parent range: Swabian Jura

The Ipf is a mostly treeless mountain (668 metres (2,192 ft) high), near Bopfingen, Ostalbkreis, Baden-Württemberg, Germany, with a prehistoric hill fort on its top.

The fort is situated on an isolated hill, with a flattened summit surrounded by a stone wall, ditch and large counterscarp (outer bank). The overall diameter is about 180 metres (590 ft). Extensive ramparts traverse the slopes to protect a large enclosed area and entranceway. There is evidence of occupation from the Bronze Age (Urnfield culture) through the early Iron Age Hallstatt period to the early Celtic La Tene period, a span of almost a thousand years (1200 BC – 300 BC). The summit was already levelled, fortified and densely settled in the Urnfield period. During the early Iron Age Hallstatt period and into the early La Tène period the Ipf was an important 'princely seat' – a regional centre of power and aristocratic residence with long-distance trade connections, including with Greece and Italy.

== Gallery ==
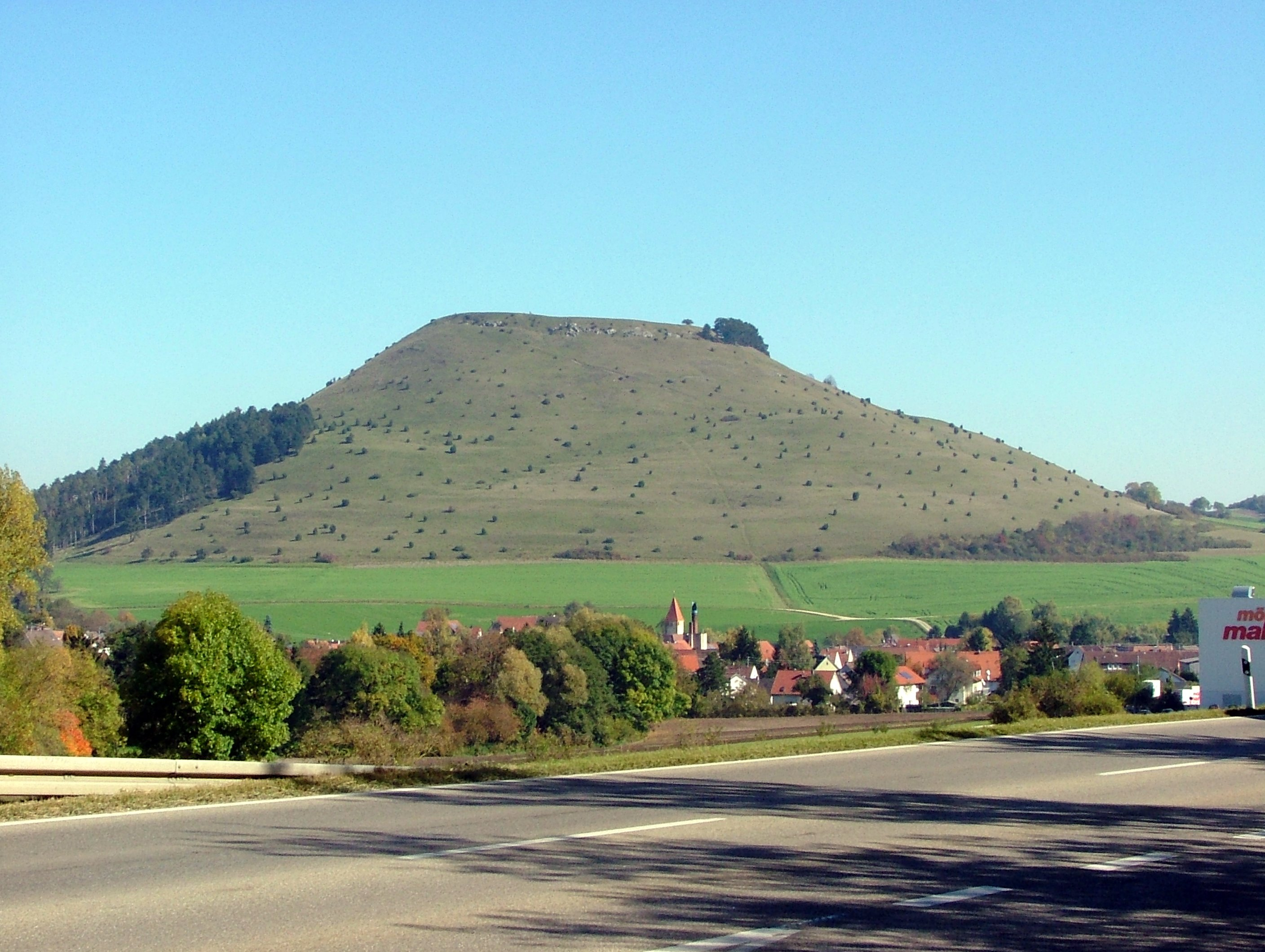
Ipf mountain

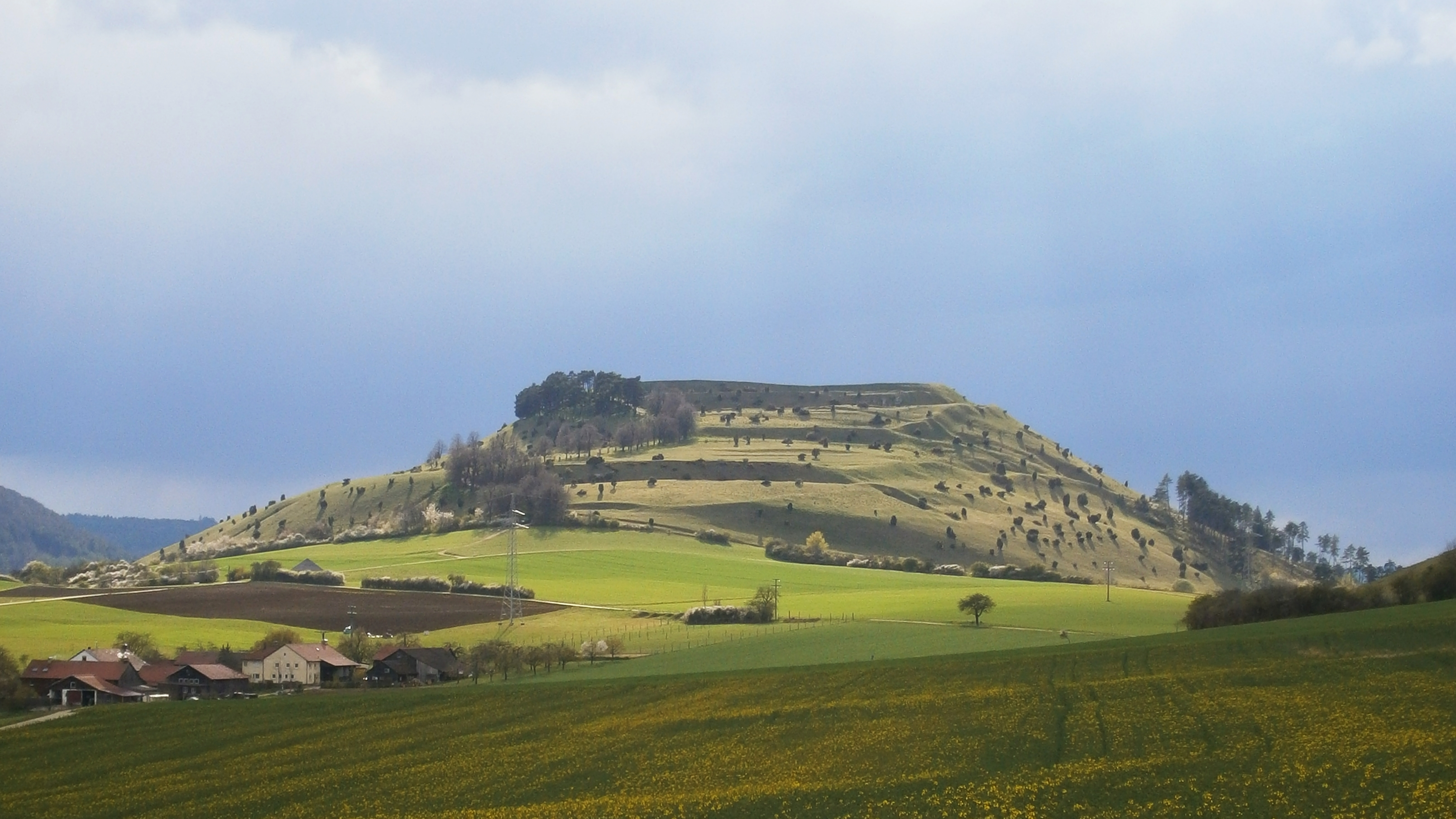
View showing remains of fortifications

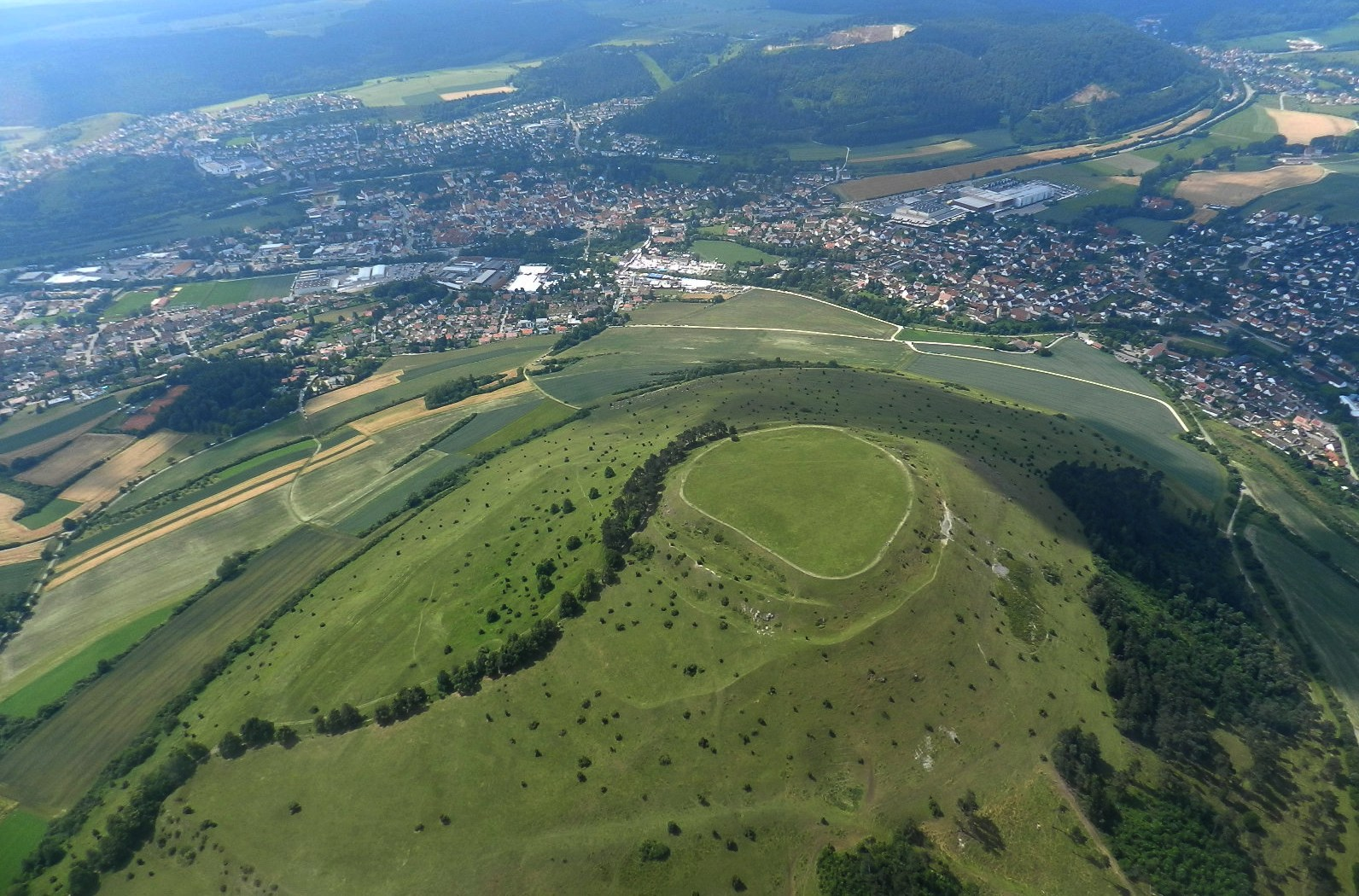
Aerial view

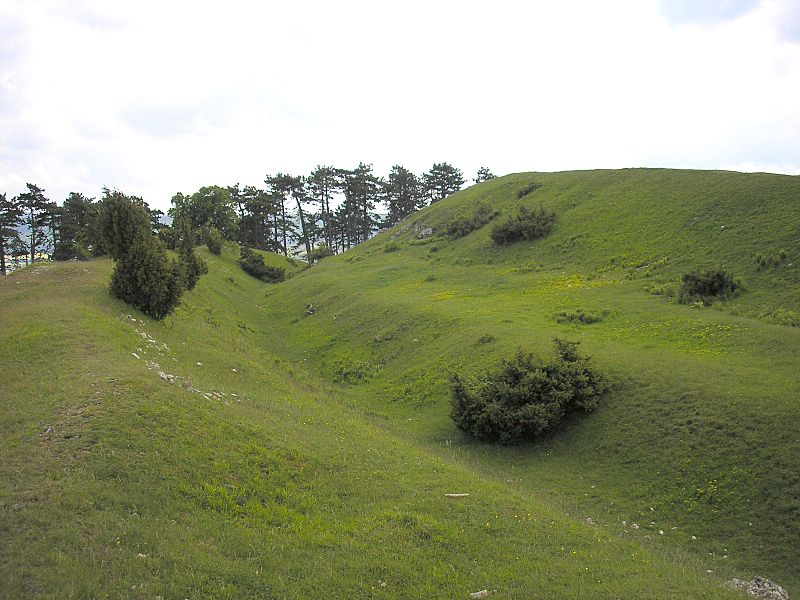
Remains of fortifications

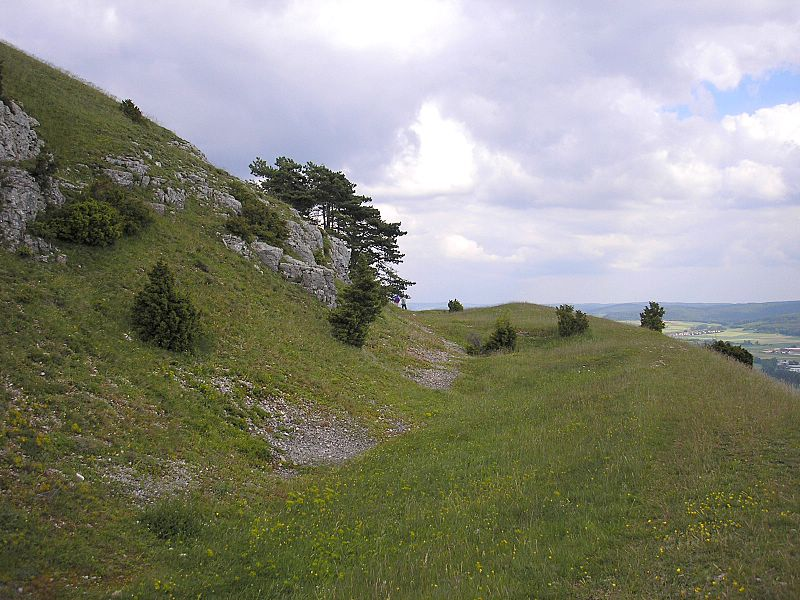
Remains of fortifications

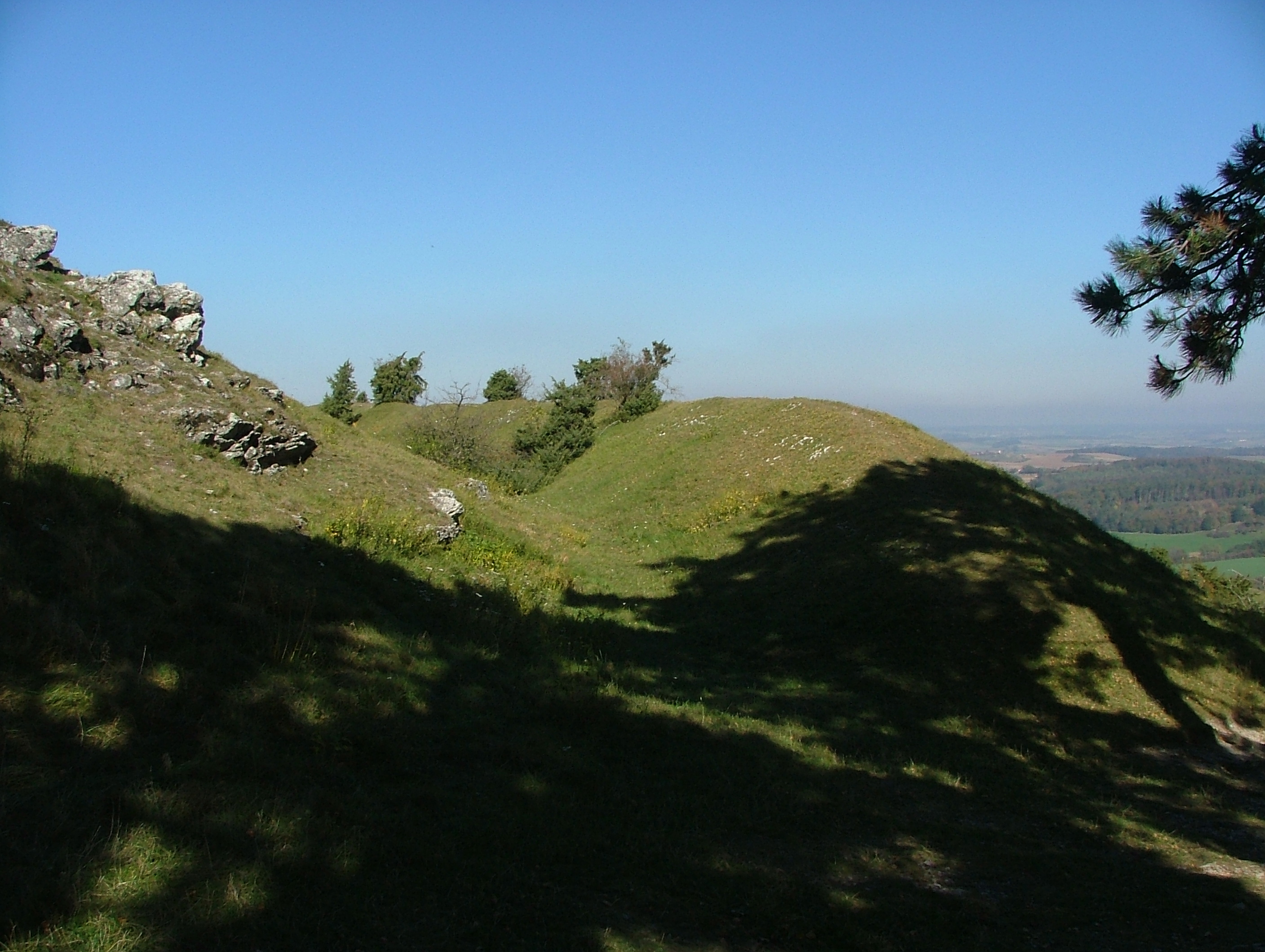
Remains of fortifications

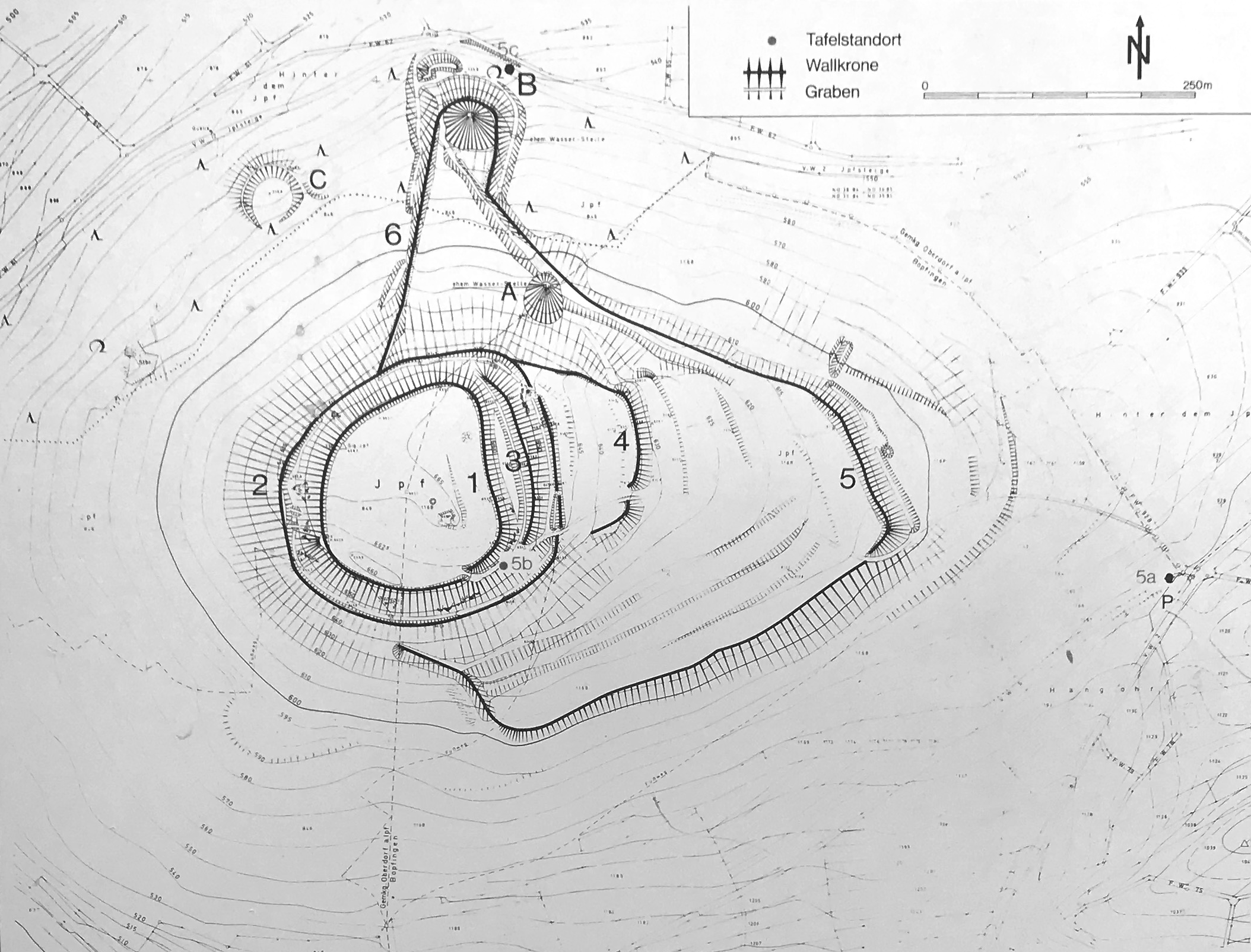
Diagram of fortifications

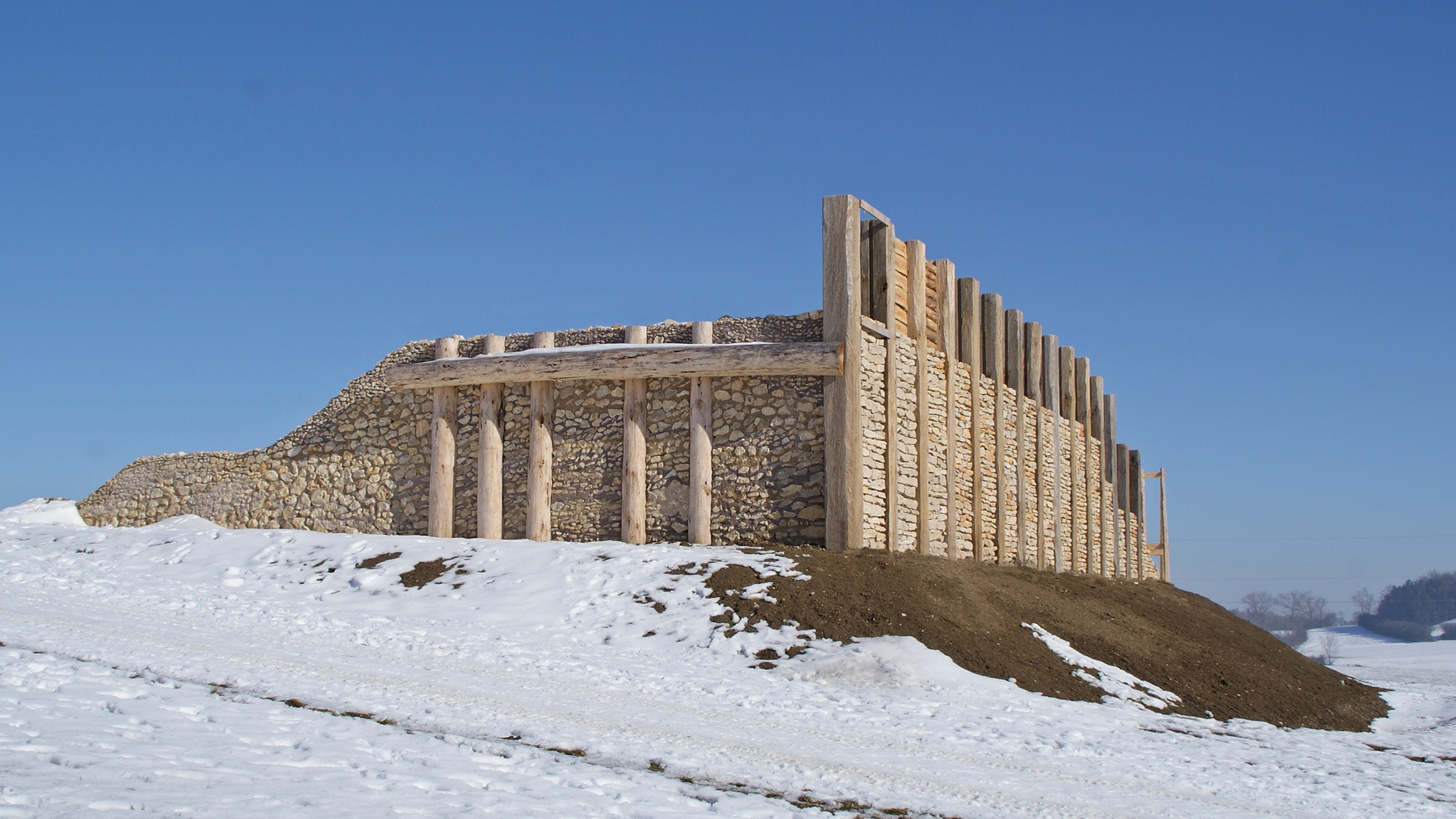
Reconstructed fortification wall/ rampart of the early La Tene period (5th century BC)

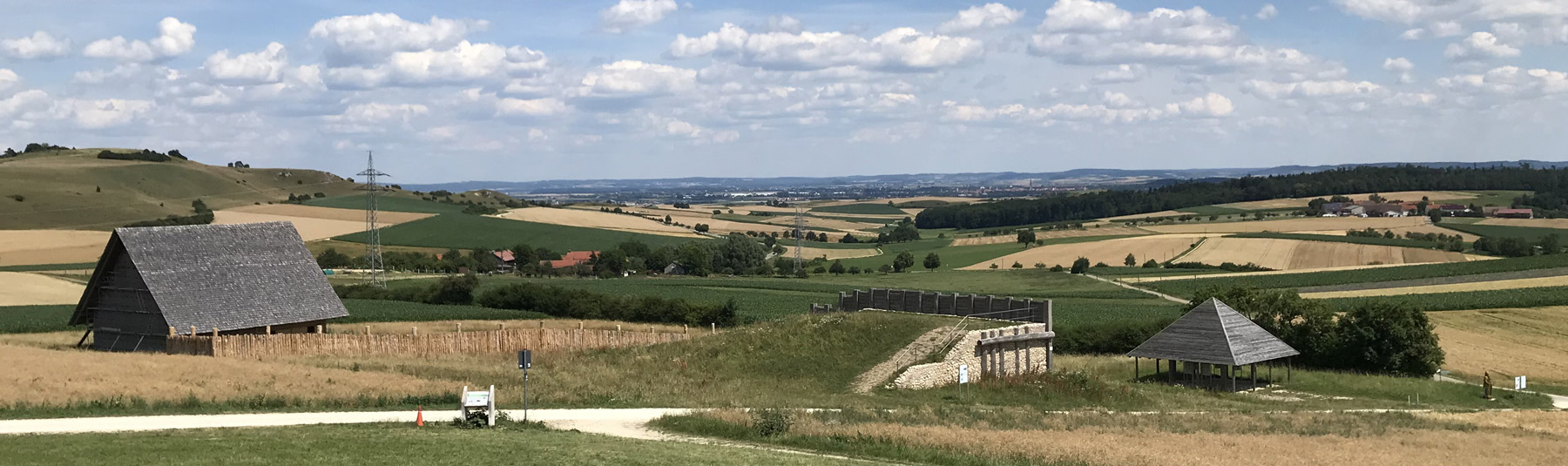
Reconstruction of rampart and building (left)

== See also ==
- Urnfield culture
- Hallstatt culture
- La Tene culture
- Heuneburg
- Hochdorf Chieftain's Grave
- Hohenasperg
- Glauberg
- Vix Grave
- Burgstallkogel
- Ipf bei Bopfingen German-language wikipedia page with more information
- Alte Burg (Langenenslingen)
- Magdalenenberg
- Lavau Grave
- Oppidum of Manching
