= Grächwil =

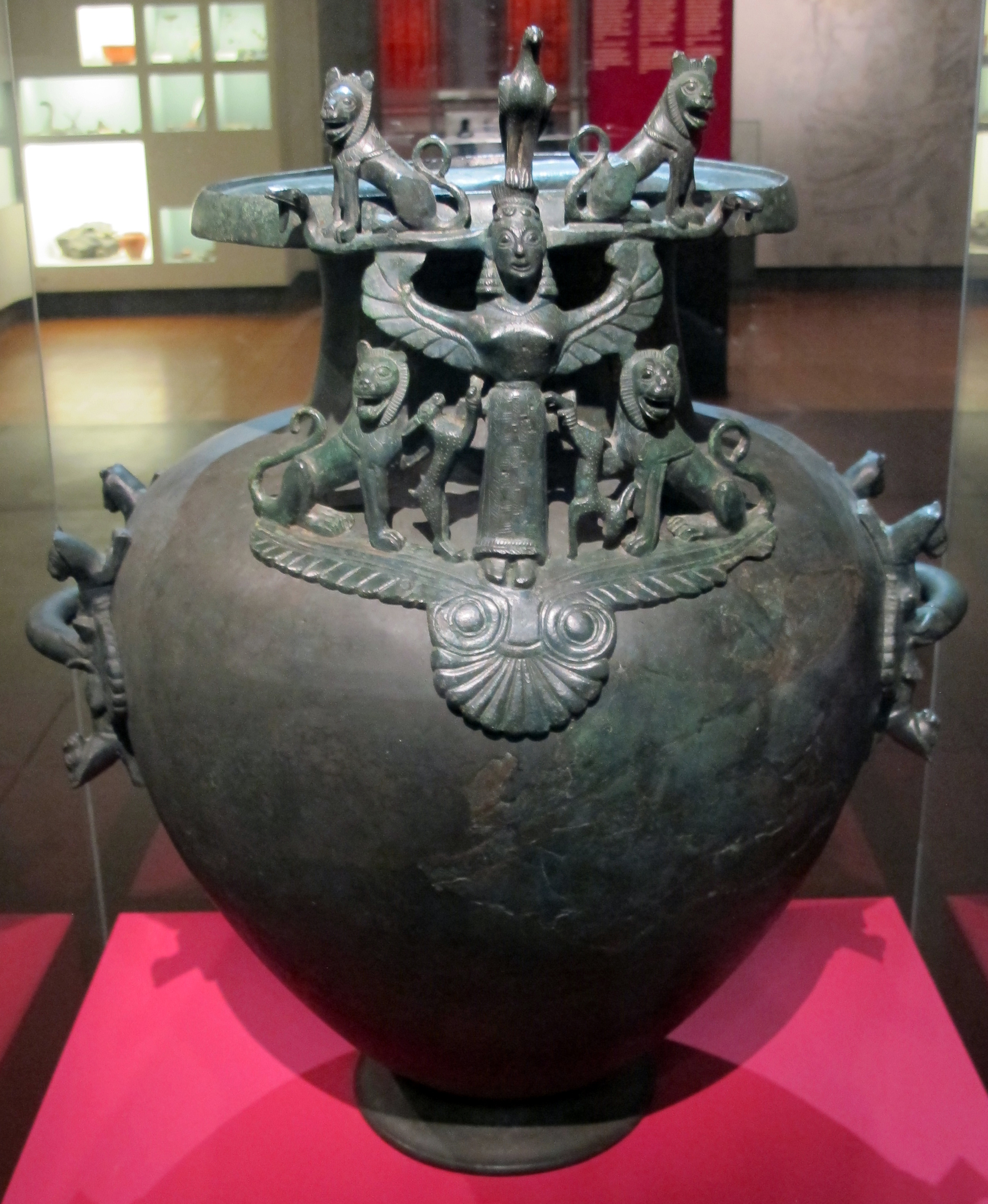
The Grächwil Hydria in the Bern Historical Museum

Grächwil is a hamlet of the municipality of Meikirch in the Swiss canton of Bern. A number of Hallstatt period artefacts have been found in Grächwil, including an imported bronze vessel known as the 'Grächwil Hydria', found in the princely tomb of a Celtic chieftain in 1851. The hydria is thought to originate from Laconia in Greece and its production is dated to ca. 600 BC, or the first half of the 6th century BC. The burial is dated to c. 500 BC.

== See also ==
- Vix Grave
- Lavau Grave
- Grafenbühl grave

== Literature ==
- Martin Guggisberg: Die Hydria von Grächwil: zur Funktion und Rezeption mediterraner Importe in Mitteleuropa im 6. und 5. Jahrhundert v. Chr. Akten, Internationales Kolloquium anlässlich des 150. Jahrestages der Entdeckung der Hydria von Grächwil, organisiert durch das Institut für Archäologie des Mittelmeerraumes der Universität Bern, Verlag Bernisches Historisches Museum, Bern 2004 (Schriften des Bernischen Historischen Museums. Bd. 5).
- Geneviève Lüscher: Die Hydria von Grächwil: ein griechisches Prunkgefäß aus Tarent. Bernisches Historisches Museum, Bern 2002 (Glanzlichter aus dem Bernischen Historischen Museum. Bd. 8).
- Herbert A. Cahn: Le vase de Bronze de Graechwil et autres importations méridionales en Suisse avant les Romains. Bernigaud, Dijon 1958.
